= Raigam Tele'es =

- Current: 21st Raigam Tele'es
- Trophy of the award
- Awarded for: Excellence in television program achievements
- Country: Sri Lanka
- Presented by: Kingdom of Raigam
- First award: 8 December 2005
- Final award: 28 March 2026
- Website: www.raigamtelees.lk

Raigam Tele'es (Sinhala: රයිගම් ටෙලි සම්මාන) is an award bestowed to distinguished individuals involved with Sri Lanka's television screen, each year by the Kingdom of Raigam, Sri Lanka, in recognition of the various contributions made by them to the Sri Lankan teledrama industry, television programs, and media sector in the preceding year. The Raigam Tele'es is one of the most popular television program events in Sri Lanka. The awards were first introduced in 2005.

== History ==
Established to recognize those in the teledrama industry, including artists and technicians, the Raigam Tele Awards Ceremony is an awards ceremony held in Sri Lanka.

== Awards given ==
In 2005, the award ceremony commenced with 19 awards, which increased to 55 awards in 2022. The awards are categorized into five sections Best Award category, Popular Award category, Talent Awards, Prathibha Prabha Award and Janagatha Award Category. In 2010, Raigam Tele'es, the award for the popular mega teledrama was given to Ithin Eeta Passe directed by Chandika Wijayasena and produced by ITN and Nilwala Video Team. However, the award was not awarded in the following years.

=== Best awards ===
- Best Actor
- Best Actress
- Best Supporting Actor
- Best Supporting Actress
- Best Upcoming Actor
- Best Upcoming Actress
- Best Director
- Best Art Director
- Best Single Episode
- Best Makeup Artist
- Best Lighting & Cameraman
- Best Editor
- Best Music Director
- Best Teledrama
- Best Script
- Best Lyrics
- Best Singer
- Best Current Affairs
- Best Documentary
- Best Musical Program
- Best Quiz Program
- Best Reality Program
- Best Political Program
- Best Presenter
- Best Children's Program
- Best Educational Program
- Best Sports Program
- Best News Reporting
- Best News Reader

=== Awards based on popular vote ===
- Popular Actor
- Popular Actress
- Popular Teledrama

=== Talent awards ===
- Raigam Tele'es Merit Awards
- Raigam Tele'es Jury Awards

=== Special awards ===
- Prathibha Prabha Award
- Channel of the Year Award

=== Most Admired Awards (Janagatha awards) ===
- Most Admired Media Programme
- Most Admired Teledrama
- Most Admired Actor
- Most Admired Actress
- Most Admired Television Channel
- Most Admired News

== Award ceremonies ==
=== 1st Raigam Tele'es 2004 ===
The first Raigam Tele'es Awards ceremony was celebrated on 8 December 2005 at the BMICH. During the ceremony, 19 awards were given under 2 categories. The teledramas that were telecast from January 1 to December 31, 2004, were selected for the ceremony. The teledramas should be less than 50 episodes and must be locally produced. The final date to submit the dramas with VHS or CD copies was August 30.

=== 2nd Raigam Tele'es 2005 ===
The second Raigam Tele'es Awards ceremony was celebrated in 2006. During the festival, Suminda Sirisena won the Best Actor award and Chandani Seneviratne won the Best Actress Award.

=== 3rd Raigam Tele'es 2006 ===
The third Raigam Tele'es Awards ceremony was celebrated on 18 May 2007 at the BMICH. The judging panel was headed by the Senior Lecturer of Kelaniya University, Dr Patrick Ratnayake. 30 Awards were awarded cash prizes.

=== 4th Raigam Tele'es 2007 ===
The fourth Raigam Tele'es Awards ceremony was celebrated on 9 May 2008 at 7.00 p.m. at the BMICH. Speaker W.J.M. Lokubandara participated as the Chief Guest. In the best award category, Raigam Tele'es Award for the best teledrama actor was won by Vishwajith Gunasekara and the best teledrama actress was Chandani Seneviratne. In the popular award category, Amila Abeysekara won the most popular actor award, whereas Chathurika Peiris won the most popular actress award. The Prathibha Prabha award was given to veteran media personality Shan Wickremesinghe of TNL for his contribution to the Sri Lankan television media.

=== 5th Raigam Tele'es 2008 ===
The fifth Raigam Tele'es Awards ceremony was celebrated on 16 May 2009 at BMICH, where 38 awards were given ceremony under 4 categories. In the best award category, Raigam Tele'es Award for the best teledrama actor was won by Janak Premalal and the best teledrama actress was Nilmini Tennakoon. In the popular award category, Amila Abeysekara won the most popular actor award, whereas Nehara Peiris won the most popular actress award.< The Prathibha Prabha award was given to veteran director Titus Thotawatte. Out of 38 awards given, teledrama Karuwala Gedara won 8 awards including best actor, actress, director, script and television series.

=== 6th Raigam Tele'es 2009 ===
The Press Conference for the 6th Raigam Tele Awards Ceremony was held on 9 February 2010 at the Galle Face hotel. The Awards ceremony was celebrated on 7 May 2010 at the Sri Lanka Exhibition and Convention Centre. In the best award category, Raigam Tele'es Award for the best teledrama actor was won by Jayalath Manoratne and the best teledrama actress was Duleeka Marapana. In the popular award category, Menaka Rajapakse won the most popular actor award, whereas Nehara Peiris won the most popular actress award for the second consecutive time. The Prathibha Prabha award was given to veteran actor Sathischandra Edirisinghe for his contribution to the performing arts of Sri Lanka. Out of the awards given, the teledrama Karuwala Gedera won eight awards including best actor, best director, best cameraman and best art director.

=== 7th Raigam Tele'es 2010 ===
The Press Conference for the 7th Raigam Tele Awards Ceremony was held on 18 January 2011 at the Grand Oriental Hotel. The Awards ceremony was celebrated on 13 May 2011 at the Sugathadasa Indoor Stadium.

=== 8th Raigam Tele'es 2011 ===
The Press Conference for the 8th Raigam Tele Awards Ceremony was held on 10 January 2012 at the Grand Oriental Hotel. The Awards ceremony was celebrated on 11 May 2012 at the Grand Banquet Hall of Waters Edge. In the best award category, Raigam Tele'es Award for the best teledrama actor was won by Bimal Jayakody and the best teledrama actress was Damitha Abeyratne. In the popular award category, Saranga Disasekara won the most popular actor award, whereas Nehara Peiris won the most popular actress award for the fourth consecutive year. The Prathibha Prabha award was given to the veteran actor, scriptwriter and novelist Tony Ranasinghe. Out of the awards given, the teledrama Swayanjatha won many awards including best actress, supporting actor, best female singer and best music director.

=== 9th Raigam Tele'es 2012 ===
The Press Conference for the 9th Raigam Tele Awards Ceremony was held on 27 February 2013 at the Sri Lanka Foundation Institute, Colombo. The Awards ceremony was celebrated on 17 May 2013 at the Water's Edge. 57 awards were given at the ceremony. 568 applications were considered for the awards, which is recorded as the largest number of applications received for the Raigam Tele'es. In the best award category, Raigam Tele'es Award for the best teledrama actor was won by Sriyantha Mendis and the best teledrama actress was Kanchana Mendis. In the popular award category, Saranga Disasekara won the most popular actor award for the second consecutive time, whereas Asha Edirisinghe won the most popular actress award. The Prathibha Prabha award was given to veteran director and artist Dharmasena Pathiraja.

=== 10th Raigam Tele'es 2013 ===
The Press Conference for the 10th Raigam Tele Awards Ceremony was held on 11 February 2014 at the Sri Lanka Foundation Institute. For the first time, a Nominations Ceremony was held on 6 June 2014 at the BMICH. Honourable Minister for Cultural Affairs T.B.Ekanayake took part as the chief guest. The Awards ceremony was celebrated on 6 June 2014 at the Water's Edge with the participation of former Prime Minister and Senior Minister for Good Governance and Infrastructure Development Honorable Ratnasiri Wickramanayake as the chief guest. 56 awards were given under five categories. In the best award category, the Sumathi Award for the best teledrama actor was won by Jackson Anthony and the best teledrama actress was Nilukshi Fernando. In the popular award category, Jagath Chamila won the most popular actor award, whereas Asha Edirisinghe won the most popular actress award. The Prathibha Prabha award was given to the veteran dramatist Jayalath Manoratne. Out of 46 awards given, the teledrama Appachchi won 9 awards, including best director, script and television series.

=== 11th Raigam Tele'es 2014 ===
The Press Conference for the 11th Raigam Tele Awards Ceremony was held on 27 January 2015 at the Sri Lanka Foundation Institute. The Nominations Ceremony was held on 26 May 2015 at the Kingsbury Hotel, Colombo. The Awards ceremony was celebrated on 12 June 2015 at the Nelum Pokuna Theatre. The chief guest of the Evening was the Former Prime Minister and Senior Minister for Good Governance and Infra-structure Facilities Hon. Ratnasiri Wickramanayake. 55 awards were given under five categories. In the best award category, Raigam Tele'es Award for the best teledrama actor was won by Vishwajith Gunasekara and the best teledrama actress was Chandani Seneviratne. In the popular award category, Saranga Disasekara won the most popular actor award, whereas Udari Warnakulasooriya won the most popular actress award. The Prathibha Prabha award was given to veteran actor Cyril Wickramage.

=== 12th Raigam Tele'es 2015 ===
The Nominations Ceremony for the 12th Raigam Tele Awards Ceremony was held on 13 May 2016 at the Kingsbury Hotel, Colombo. The Awards ceremony was celebrated on 3 June 2016 at the Nelum Pokuna Theatre. Chief Guest of the Evening was His Excellency the President Maithreepala Sirisena. 47 awards were given under five categories. In the best award category, Raigam Tele'es Award for the best teledrama actor was won by Roshan Ravindra and the best teledrama actress was Menaka Peiris. In the popular award category, Saranga Disasekara won the most popular actor award, whereas Shalani Tharaka won the most popular actress award. The Prathibha Prabha award was given to the veteran cinema actor, Ravindra Randeniya. Out of 47 awards given, teledrama Daskon won 14 awards, including best supporting actor, director, script and television series.

=== 13th Raigam Tele'es 2016 ===
The Press Conference for the 13th Raigam Tele Awards Ceremony was held on 7 February 2017 at the Sri Lanka Foundation Institute. The Nominations Ceremony was held on 19 May 2017 at the Kingsbury Hotel, Colombo. Previously the award ceremony was scheduled to be held on 3 June 2017 at Nelum Pokuna Theatre, but due to unfavorable weather conditions prevailing in the country, it was postponed. The Awards ceremony was celebrated on 24 June 2017 at the Nelum Pokuna Theatre. 57 awards were given under five categories. In the best award category, Raigam Tele'es Award for the best teledrama actor was won by Pubudu Chathuranga and the best teledrama actress was Umali Thilakarathne. In the popular award category, Ruwan Perera won the most popular actor award, whereas Nayanathara Wickramaarachchi won the most popular actress award. The Prathibha Prabha award was given to the Queen of Sinhala cinema, Malini Fonseka. Out of 38 awards given, the teledrama One Way won 14 awards, including best actor, actress, director, script and television series.

=== 14th Raigam Tele'es 2017 ===
The Press Conference for the 14th Raigam Tele Awards Ceremony and Nominations was held on 12 March 2018 at the Sri Lanka Foundation Institute. Nomination Ceremony was held on 9 March 2018, where nominations for 18 awards under the “Excellence in Tele-drama” category, and 19 awards under the “Excellence in Television Media Programmes” category were announced. At the nomination evening, the first-ever Sri Lankan mobile app was launched as well to vote popular category actors, actress, and teledrama. The Award ceremony was held on 24 March 2018 at Nelum Pokuna Theatre. The ceremony awarded 57 awards which included 11 jury awards, 20 media excellence awards, 23 teledrama excellence awards and 3 special excellence awards. In the best award category, Raigam Tele'es Award for the best teledrama actor was won by Mahendra Perera and the best teledrama actress was Nadee Kammalweera. In the popular award category, Thumindu Dodantenna won the most popular actor award. For the second consecutive time, Nayanathara Wickramarachchi won the most popular actress award. The Prathibha Prabha award was given to the veteran dramatist, Wijeratne Warakagoda. Out of 57 awards given, the teledrama Badde Kulawamiya won 12 awards, including best actor, actress, director, script and television series.

=== 15th Raigam Tele'es 2018 ===
The 15th Raigam Tele'es Award Ceremony was held on 23 March 2019 at Nelum Pokuna theatre to celebrate the 15th anniversary. The Nomination Ceremony was held in March 2019 at the Kingsbury Hotel, Colombo. Critically acclaimed teledrama Koombiyo was awarded the best teledrama of the year. A new award was given to the Best telefilm, which was won by Giri Durga by Diluka Prasad and telecast by TV Derana. TV Derana along with Sirasa TV jointly won the award for the best program provider channel of the year. Award for the best dubbing program won by Adhiraja Dharmashoka of TV Derana. The program Kalabara of ITN won the award for the best magazine program.

The ceremony awarded 59 awards which included 11 jury awards, 20 media excellence awards, 25 teledrama excellence awards and 3 special excellence awards. In the best award category, Raigam Tele'es Award for the best teledrama actor was won by Roshan Ravindra and the best teledrama actress was Chandani Seneviratne. In the popular award category, Raween Kanishka won the most popular actor award. For the third consecutive time, Nayanathara Wickramarachchi won the most popular actress award. The Prathibha Prabha award was given to the veteran actress, Sriyani Amarasena. Out of 59 awards given, teledrama Koombiyo won 7 awards, including best upcoming actor, supporting actor, director, editing and television series.

=== 16th Raigam Tele'es 2019 ===
The 16th Raigam Tele Awards nominations ceremony was held at the Kingsbury Hotel. The theme of this year's Raigam Festival is "16 Independence". The Award Ceremony was scheduled to be held on 21 March 2020 at Nelum Pokuna theater, but was delayed due to the COVID-19 pandemic in Sri Lanka. It was later scheduled to be held on the evening of 19 September 2020 at the Shangri-La Colombo with a few participants and health measures. Three new awards were given to the Best Sound Recording, which was won by S. Rajendran for the serial Veeraya Gedara Awith; Best Dubbing program, which was won by Swarnavahini for the serial Maharaja Kansa, and Best Lecture Program, which was won by Harshajeewa Abeykoon for Naadiya political program.

In the best award category, Raigam Tele'es Award for the best teledrama actor was won by Ananda Kumara Unnehe and the best teledrama actress was Shalani Tharaka. In the popular award category, Raween Kanishka won the most popular actor award for the second consecutive time. Meanwhile, Shalani Tharaka won the most popular actress award, breaking the 24-year-old record for winning both awards at the same time. The Prathibha Prabha award was given to the veteran filmmaker, Sumitra Peries. Other than that, two more special awards were given to veteran musician Manoj Peries and veteran actress Leonie Kotelawala. Meanwhile, Himali Sayurangi won the Special Appreciation Award due to being nominated three consecutive times for the Best Actress Award category.

=== 17th Raigam Tele'es 2020-21 ===
The 17th Raigam Tele Awards for Tele-Television Awards 2020 was scheduled to be held on the 3rd of July 2021 at the Nelum Pokuna Theater, Colombo. The nomination ceremony, which precedes the event, was scheduled to be held on 4 June 2021 at the Shangri-La, Colombo. However both occasions were delayed indefinitely due to the lockdown of the country due to the third COVID-19 wave. In December 2021, the Kingdom of Raigam announced that the awards ceremony would be held on 25 March 2022 at the Shangri-La Colombo. Separate awards were presented for the two years 2020-2021, and the closing date for entries for the year 2021 was 15 January 2022. The Nomination ceremony was held on 25 February 2021 at The Kingsbury, Colombo. However the ceremony was finally held on 26 March 2022.

Overall 108 awards were presented for two years: 47 were recommended for 2020 and 57 for 2021. A new set of awards titled "Janagatha Sammana" (Popular award set) will be given for this awards ceremony. Winners of the Popular Awards will be chosen by audience preference and based on an accepted methodology based on the most popular teledrama, television program, and newscast survey data and viewing times of the year.

In the best award category for 2020, Raigam Tele'es Award for the best teledrama actor was won by Bimal Jayakody and the best teledrama actress was Udari Warnakulasooriya. In the best award category for 2021, Raigam Tele'es Award for the best teledrama actor was won by Thusitha Laknath and best teledrama actress was Champa Sriyani. In the popular award category, Kusal Maduranga won the most popular actor award whereas Shalani Tharaka won the most popular actress award. The Prathibha Prabha award was given to the veteran actress, Suvineetha Weerasinghe. The serial Thanamalvila Kollek won the most number of awards in the 2020 section (13). The serial Sakarma won the most number of awards in the 2021 section (14).

=== 21st Raigam Tele'es 2025 ===
The 21st Raigam Tele Awards for Tele-Television Awards 2024 was held on the 28th of March 2025 at the Shangri-La Colombo. Prior to that, the nominees for the awards were selected through submission of applications. Reruns and pay-per-view television channels were not eligible for the award ceremony. The most popular teledrama, teledrama actor and actress of the year were selected by people's vote from the duration of 28 February 2025 to 28 March 2025.

Accordingly, seven award categories including Teledrama Excellence Awards, Television Media Excellence Awards, Popular Awards, were open for voting from February 28 until midnight on March 28th 2025. A total of 58 certificates, 06 merits and special jury evaluation awards, and 3 commendations were presented including the Prathiba Prabha lifetime achievement award. All the awardees were presented with valuable cash prizes, a life insurance policy worth one million rupees for one year, and a medical insurance policy worth one hundred thousand rupees, along with a valuable certificate acknowledging their achievements.

In the best award category, Raigam Tele'es Award for the best teledrama actor was won by Priyantha Sirikumara and the best teledrama actress was Tharindi Fernando. In the popular award category, Uddika Premarathna won the most popular actor award for the second consecutive time. Meanwhile, Dinakshie Priyasad won the most popular actress award. Pranama Awards were given to Palitha Perera, K.D. Dayananda, and Sampath Yahampath. The Prathibha Prabha award was given to the veteran actress, Anoja Weerasinghe.

== See also ==
- List of Asian television awards
