= List of performing arts awards =

This list of performing arts awards is an index to articles that describe notable awards related to the performing arts. The list includes awards for the performing arts in general, for supporting roles such as lighting and make-up, and for specialized genres such as magic and puppetry. The list excludes awards for acting, dance, music and theatre which are covered by separate lists.

== General ==
| Country | Award | Sponsor | Description |
|---|---|---|---|
| Australia | ASTRA Awards | Australian Subscription Television and Radio Association | Excellence in subscription television in production, programming and talent |
| United States | Actors Fund Medal of Honor | Actors Fund of America | Individuals and organizations that are committed to enriching the entertainment community |
| New Zealand | Benny Award | Variety Artists Club of New Zealand | A lifetime of excellence in their field of the performing arts |
| United Kingdom | Critics' Circle Award for Distinguished Service to the Arts | The Critics' Circle | Distinguished service to the arts, |
| New Zealand | Grand Master of Magic Award | Brotherhood of Auckland Magicians | A lifetime of excellence in the magical arts |
| Australia | Green Room Awards | Green Room Awards Association | Excellence in the performing arts in Melbourne, Australia |
| United States | Kennedy Center Honors | John F. Kennedy Center for the Performing Arts | Lifetime of contributions to American culture |
| United States | Las Vegas Entertainer of the Year | Entertainment Consumers Exchange | Favorites in entertainment |
| United States | List of Academy of Magical Arts Award Winners | Magic Castle | Individuals who have made significant contributions to the field of magic |
| United States | Merlin Award | International Magicians Society | Magicians who have achieved the highest level in their craft, both on the national and international stage |
| Chile | National Prize for Performing and Audiovisual Arts | National Prize of Chile | Person who has distinguished themselves by their achievements in the respective area of the arts |
| North Korea | People's Prize | People's Prize Awarding Commission | Best achievements in creative fields |
| United States | Princess Grace Awards | Princess Grace Foundation-USA | Theater, dance, and film artists |
| Canada | Prix Denise-Pelletier | Government of Quebec | Outstanding career in the performing arts |
| Sri Lanka | Raigam Tele'es Best Teledrama Art Director Award | Raigam Tele'es | |
| Sri Lanka | Raigam Tele'es Best Teledrama Editor Award | Raigam Tele'es | |
| Sri Lanka | Raigam Tele'es Best Teledrama Lighting & Cameraman Award | Raigam Tele'es | |
| Sri Lanka | Raigam Tele'es Best Teledrama Makeup Artist Award | Raigam Tele'es | |
| Sri Lanka | Raigam Tele'es Best Teledrama Script Award | Raigam Tele'es | |
| Sri Lanka | Raigam Tele'es Best Teledrama Single Episode Award | Raigam Tele'es | |
| Australia | Rolling Stone Australia Awards | Rolling Stone Australia | Outstanding contributions to popular culture |
| Ukraine | Shevchenko National Prize | Government of Ukraine | Performing Arts (theatrical, musical, others) |
| Australia | Sidney Myer Performing Arts Awards | Sidney Myer Fund | Outstanding achievements in dance, drama, comedy, music, opera, circus and puppetry |
| Sri Lanka | Sumathi Best Teledrama Art Director Award | Sumathi Group | |
| Sri Lanka | Sumathi Best Teledrama Script Award | Sumathi Group | |
| Sri Lanka | Sumathi Best Teledrama Single Episode Award | Sumathi Group | |
| India | Tulsi Samman | Government of Madhya Pradesh | Outstanding achievement in the tribal, traditional and folk arts: art, theatre, dance and music. |
| United Kingdom | UK Festival Awards | Virtual Festivals.com | All aspects of festivals |

== See also ==
- Lists of awards
- Lists of acting awards
- List of dance awards
- List of music awards
- List of theatre awards
- Lists of humanities awards
