= Madhavee Wathsala Anthony =

Sri Lankan actress, singer and television presenter

- මාධවී වත්සලා ඇන්තනී
- Born: Conganige Madhavee Wathsala Anthony; 6 August 1988 (age 37); Colombo, Sri Lanka
- Education: Holy Cross College; Holy Family Convent, Bambalapitiya; Visakha Vidyalaya
- Alma mater: University of Kelaniya; University of Colombo
- Occupations: Actress; singer; dancer; model; TV host
- Years active: 1994–present
- Spouses: Aloka Liyanage (m. 2010; div. 2016); Milan Silva (m. 2019; div. 2022); Kasun Heenatigala (m. 2024)
- Parents: Jackson Anthony (father); Kumari Munasinghe (mother)
- Relatives: Akila Dhanuddara (brother); Sajitha Anthony (brother); Senaka Titus (uncle); Sudath Anthony (uncle)
- Awards: Best Upcoming Actress
- Musical career
- Genres: Pop; R&B
- Instrument: Vocals
- Years active: 1994–present
- Label: MEntertainment

Conganige Madhavee Wathsala Anthony (born 6 August 1988 Sinhala: මාධවී වත්සලා ඇන්තනී), popularly known as Madhavee Wathsala, is an actress in Sri Lankan cinema. Started as a child artist through the popular television musical show Hapan Padura, Madhavee is also excelled her career as a singer, dancer, model and a television host.

== Personal life ==
She was born on 6 August 1988 in Colombo, Sri Lanka as the eldest child of an artistic family. Her father Jackson Anthony is a popular actor in Sri Lankan cinema, theatre and television. Often considered as one of the most versatile actors in Sri Lanka, Jackson has appeared before the public in versatile forms; director, producer, singer, screenwriter, television host, novelist, columnist, lyricist, historian and traveller. Her mother Kumari Sandalatha Munasinghe is also a popular singer and actress in Sri Lankan cinema, theatre and television.

Madhavee started her education at Holy Cross College from 1994 to 2003. Then in 2003, she attended to Holy Family Convent, Bambalapitiya and completed O/Ls. Later she completed A/Ls from Visakha Vidyalaya. In 2013, she graduated with a Bachelor of Arts Special Degree in Archaeology at the University of Kelaniya. She is currently doing her Masters in Tourism Economics and Hotel Management from University of Colombo.

Her uncle Senaka Titus Anthony was a popular actor and journalist who died on 23 October 2017 in Singapore due to kidney and liver failure. Her uncle Sudath Anthony is also a popular actor in television.

Madhavee has two younger brothers: Akila Dhanuddara and Sajitha Anthony. Akila is a popular actor in cinema and television who appeared in the popular films Siri Parakum and Address Na. Younger brother Sajitha is also a popular actor and singer who started his career as a child artist. Sajitha made several popular roles in the films Sooriya Arana, Kurulu Pihatu, Aba as well as award-winning television serials Bohimiyanuwa and Nadagamkarayo.

She was previously married to doctor Aloka Liyanage, son of the veteran actor Hemasiri Liyanage in 2010. However, they divorced in 2016. She is then married to Milan Silva, a flight attendant affiliated to SriLankan Airlines until divorced in 2023. She first met Milan at a festival held at Chandeepa Jayakody's home. The wedding ceremony was held on 18 January 2019 along with her two younger brothers. She is currently married to Kasun Mahendra Heenatigala, who is an author.

== Career ==
In 1994, at the age of six, she became an A-grade child vocalist at Sri Lanka Broadcasting Corporation (SLBC) under the guidance of her mother Kumari Munasinghe. During this period, she participated in many children programs of SLBC such as Lama Pitiya and Handa Mama. In 1999, she became a child radio presenter in Savana FM (now Shree FM). Then she made her maiden television appearance with the television serial Esala Kaluwara directed by her father Jackson Anthony. At the age of twelve, Madhavee sang the song "Pipilada Sunimal" for her mother's album.

In 1999, she appeared in an episode Jeewithayata Ida Denna in the Poya day television serial Sitha Nivana Katha directed by Ananda Abenayake. In 2000 she appeared in the serial Kahala Nadaya directed by Santhusa Liyanage in the child cast. In 2001, Madhavee became a child singer with the popular musical program Hapan Padura. The Musical direction for the program was done by Asela Bandara Dissanayake while her father Jackson Anthony directed and Thusitha Wimalasiri produced it. The show became a hallmark in Sinhala children's program history. In the same time, she worked as a child presenter in the children's program Swarna Kekulu until 2004.

After completing her higher studies, she appeared as an actress and a television presenter on mainstream television. She made a comeback with the blockbuster film Address Na directed by her father Jackson Anthony with the supportive role 'Janaki'. In 2016, she acted in the serial Daskon directed by her father. The serial received critical acclaim and was later awarded at several television award ceremonies. Madhavee later won the award for the Best Upcoming Actress at Raigam Tele'es for her critically acclaimed role 'Palingu Achchi'. In 2016, she won the Merit award for Acting and Singing at Sumathi Awards. In the same year, she won a Merit award for Acting and Singing at National Tele Awards.

Then in 2017, she acted in the serial Pali. In 2018, she appeared in another critically acclaimed serial See Raja directed by her father. For her role, she was nominated for the Best Female Singer and Best Supporting Actress awards at Raigam Tele'es. In 2020, she acted in two television serials Mahaviru Pandu and Amalia.

Apart from acting, she continued to work as a singer primarily with two theme songs in the television serials Daskon and See Raja. She then made the single Piyambamee. Then she made a collaborative work featuring Thisara Weerasinghe for the song Raththarane. Her single Oba Epa became an instant hit in 2018. Since 2015, she is working as a television Presenter at Hiru TV. In 2019, she made cinema playback with the film Eka Gei Sokari directed by her father. In January 2021, she released her first music video single Adare Onakere featuring Raj Thillaiyampalam. In the same year, she appeared in the television serial Thaadi directed by Charith Abeysinghe.

In 2021, she was cast in Raffealla Fernando Celebrity Calendar along with many other Sri Lankan celebrities. In the same year, she was nominated for the Best Teledrama Actress at Sumathi Awards. Meanwhile, she also contested in the dance reality competition, "Hiru Mega Star, season 3". In 2022, she released the music video "Api Thamai Apiwa Danne".

== Other works ==
In 2013, she worked as a research assistant and museum assistant curator of the Sigiriya Museum under curator Kusumsiri Kodituwakku. In the same year, she became a research intern and curator at SAARC Cultural Centre. Then in 2014, she worked as a record indexing officer at J. R. Jayawardene Centre. From 2015 onwards, she works as a visiting lecturer for Tourism and Hospitality at Management Science University.

In 2016, she worked as the camp organizer of a global youth peace camp titled 'Global Young Leaders Peace Camp 2016' (GYLPC 2016).

== Television serials ==
Year	Teledrama	Role	Ref.
1999	Jeewithayata Ida Denna	child artist	
2000	Kahala Nadaya	child artist	
2016	Daskon	Palingu Achchi	
2017	Pali	Podi Duwa	
2018	See Raja	Subhadra	
2018	Hitha Addara	Subha	
2020	Mahaviru Pandu	Kumee	
2020	Amalia	Pramuditha Nagachandra	
2021	Thaadee	Madara	
2022	Chilli Paste	Uthpala	
2023	Chandi Kumarihami		

== Filmography ==
Key
†	Denotes films that have not yet been released

Year	Film	Role	Ref.
2015	Address Na	Janaki	
2020	Eka Gei Sokari	playback singer	
TBA	Sparsha †		
