= Lists of humanities awards =

Lists of humanities awards are lists that serve as indexes to articles about notable awards for specific areas of the humanities, academic disciplines that study aspects of human society and culture. Typically these lists give the country of the sponsoring organization, the award name, sponsor name and a description of the award criteria. Some of the awards have broad scope, or cover the intersection of different disciplines, so an award may appear in more than one list. A list of general awards in the humanities is followed by the lists of more specific awards.

== General list ==
- List of general awards in the humanities

== Specific lists ==
- List of anthropology awards
- List of archaeology awards
- List of awards for contributions to culture
- List of history awards
- List of language-related awards
- List of legal awards
- List of literary awards
  - List of literary awards honoring women
  - List of poetry awards
  - List of writing awards
- List of performing arts awards
  - Lists of acting awards
  - List of dance awards
  - List of music awards
  - List of theatre awards
- List of philosophy awards
- List of politics awards
- List of religion-related awards
  - List of ecclesiastical decorations
- Lists of art awards

== See also ==
- Lists of awards
- List of media awards
- List of social sciences awards
