= List of writing awards =

This list of writing awards is an index to articles about notable awards for writing other than literary awards. It includes general writing awards, science writing awards, screenwriting awards and songwriting awards.

== General ==
Country	Award	Venue / sponsor	Notes
United States	Brass Crescent Awards	Shahed Amanullah and Aziz Poonawalla	Best Muslim or Islam-themed weblogs
United States	HWA Silver Hammer Award	Horror Writers Association	HWA volunteer who has done a truly massive amount of work for the organization
Japan	Kobo Emerging Writer Prize	Rakuten	Three different genres
United States	Lange-Taylor Prize	Duke University	Collaboration between documentary writers and photographers
United Kingdom	Miles Morland Foundation Writing Scholarship	Miles Morland Foundation	African writers to enable them write a fiction or non-fiction book in English language
United States	New York State Writers Hall of Fame	Empire State Center for the Book	Recognize the legacy of individual New York State writers
United States	Niblet award	Mormon blogosphere	Outstanding contributions to the bloggernacle
United States	PAGE International Screenwriting Awards	PAGE Awards	Discover and promote up-and-coming new screenwriters from around the world
Thailand	Silpathorn Award	Ministry of Culture of Thailand	Promote Thai contemporary artists who are considered to be in their mid-career and who have already made notable contributions to Thai fine arts and culture
Denmark	Tagea Brandt Rejselegat	Tagea Brandt Rejselegat	Scholarship for women who have made a significant contribution in science, literature or art
United Kingdom	Travelling Scholarship	Society of Authors	Enable British creative writers to keep in touch with their colleagues abroad
United States	Writers Guild of America Awards	Writers Guild of America	Outstanding achievements in film, television, radio and video game writing

== Science writing awards ==
Country	Award	Venue / sponsor	Notes
United Kingdom	Best science book ever	Royal Institution	Based on vote
United States	Chambliss Astronomical Writing Award	American Astronomical Society	
Canada	Yves Fortier Earth Science Journalism Award	Geological Association of Canada	
United States	James T. Grady-James H. Stack Award for Interpreting Chemistry	American Chemical Society	
Denmark	H. C. Ørsted Medal	Society for the Dissemination of Natural Science	
Canada	Innis-Gérin Medal	Royal Society of Canada	Literature of the social sciences
Poland	Jan Długosz Award	International Book Fair in Kraków	Polish works that contribute to advancement of science and cultural enrichment
United States	John Burroughs Medal	John Burroughs Association	Work distinguished in the field of natural history
Canada	Lane Anderson Award	Fitzhenry Family Foundation	Canadian non-fiction science; adult and young readers
International	Ludwik Fleck Prize	Society for the Social Studies of Science	Published book in science and technology studies
United States	Patrusky Lecture	Council for the Advancement of Science Writing	
United States	PEN/E. O. Wilson Literary Science Writing Award	PEN America	
Canada	Prix Hubert-Reeves	Association of Science Communicators of Quebec	Canadian author(s) of a popular science book written in French and published in Canada
United Kingdom	Royal Society of London Michael Faraday Prize	Royal Society	Excellence in communicating science to UK audiences
United Kingdom	Royal Society Prizes for Science Books	Royal Society	Outstanding popular science books from around the world
United States	Science in Society Journalism Awards	National Association of Science Writers	Outstanding investigative and interpretive reporting about the sciences and their impact for good and ill
United States	Science Writing Award	American Institute of Physics	
United States	Walter P. Kistler Book Award	Foundation For the Future	Science books that significantly increase the knowledge and understanding of the public regarding subjects that will shape the future of our species

== Screenwriting awards for television ==
Country	Award	Venue / sponsor	Notes
Australia	AACTA Award for Best Screenplay in Television	Australian Academy of Cinema and Television Arts	
Canada	Margaret Collier Award	Academy of Canadian Cinema & Television	Canadian writer for their outstanding body of work in film or television
United States	Daytime Emmy Award for Outstanding Drama Series Writing Team	National Academy of Television Arts and Sciences, Academy of Television Arts & Sciences	
United States	Primetime Emmy Award for Outstanding Writing for a Comedy Series	Academy of Television Arts & Sciences	
United States	Primetime Emmy Award for Outstanding Writing for a Drama Series	Academy of Television Arts & Sciences	
United States	Primetime Emmy Award for Outstanding Writing for a Limited Series, Movie, or Dramatic Special	Academy of Television Arts & Sciences	
United States	Primetime Emmy Award for Outstanding Writing for a Variety Special	Academy of Television Arts & Sciences	
United States	Primetime Emmy Award for Outstanding Writing for a Variety Series	Academy of Television Arts & Sciences	
United States	Primetime Emmy Award for Outstanding Writing for Nonfiction Programming	Academy of Television Arts & Sciences	
United States	Sir Peter Ustinov Television Scriptwriting Award	International Academy of Television Arts and Sciences	Non-American novice writers under the age of 30
Canada	WGC Screenwriting Awards	Writers Guild of Canada	Best script for a feature film, television or radio project

== Songwriting awards ==
Country	Award	Venue / sponsor	Notes
Canada	Colleen Peterson Songwriting Award	Ontario Arts Council	Song by an emerging singer-songwriter from Ontario in the genres of roots, traditional, folk and country music
Germany	German Music Authors' Prize	GEMA	Composers and lyricists for their outstanding achievements
United States	Gershwin Prize	Library of Congress	Lifetime contributions to popular music
United States	Grammy Award for Best American Roots Song	Grammy Award	
United States	Grammy Award for Best Contemporary Christian Music Song	Grammy Award	
United States	Grammy Award for Best Contemporary Christian Music Performance/Song	Grammy Award	
United States	Grammy Award for Best Contemporary Song	Grammy Award	
United States	Grammy Award for Best Country Song	Grammy Award	
United States	Grammy Award for Best Gospel Performance/Song	Grammy Award	
United States	Grammy Award for Best Gospel Song	Grammy Award	
United States	Grammy Award for Best R&B Song	Grammy Award	
United States	Grammy Award for Best Rap Song	Grammy Award	
United States	Grammy Award for Best Rock Song	Grammy Award	
United States	Grammy Award for Best Song Written for Visual Media	Grammy Award	
United States	Grammy Award for Song of the Year	Grammy Award	
United States	Grammy Award for Songwriter of the Year, Non-Classical	Grammy Award	
United Kingdom	Kerrang! Award for Best Single	Kerrang! Awards	Rock music
United States	Latin Songwriters Hall of Fame	Latin Songwriters Hall of Fame	Educate, preserve, honor and celebrate the legacy of the greatest Latin songwriters from all over the world and their music in every genre
United States	Nashville Songwriters Hall of Fame	Nashville Songwriters Foundation	Honor and preserve the songwriting legacy that is uniquely associated with the music community in the city of Nashville
United States	Primetime Emmy Award for Outstanding Original Music and Lyrics	Academy of Television Arts & Sciences	
Sri Lanka	Raigam Tele'es Best Television Lyrics Award	Raigam Tele'es	
United States	Songwriters Hall of Fame	Grammy Museum	
Sri Lanka	Sumathi Best Television Lyrics Award	Sumathi Group	

== See also ==
- Lists of awards
- List of journalism awards
- List of literary awards
- List of media awards
