= Sunil Ariyaratne =

Sri Lankan academic and filmmaker (born 1949)

Professor Sunil Ariyaratne
- සුනිල් ආරියරත්න
- Born: Sunil Ariyaratne Kuruwita Bandara; 28 July 1949 (age 77); Nugegoda, Dominion of Ceylon
- Education: St. John's College, Nugegoda; University of Sri Jayewardenepura (D.Litt.)
- Occupation: Senior Professor
- Years active: 1961—present
- Awards: Wishwa Prasadini Award; Vidyodaya Vibhushana Honorary name Sahithya Kala Shiromani Honorary award Kamban Award

Vidyodaya Vibhushana Sahithya Kala Shiromani Prof. Sunil Ariyaratne Kuruwita Bandara (සුනිල් ආරියරත්න; born 28 July 1949), popularly known as Sunil Ariyaratne, is a Sri Lankan scholar, film director, author, poet and a lyricist. One of the most popular filmmakers and lyricists in Sri Lankan cinema, Ariyaratne has won six Sarasaviya awards, four Presidential awards from the year 1981 as a film lyricist and then won three awards as a teledrama lyricists.

== Personal life ==
He was born on 28 July 1949, in Nugegoda as the fourth child of the family with six siblings. He completed his Primary and Secondary education at St. John's College, Nugegoda. He has three brothers and two sisters. His brother, Nimal Kuruwita Bandara, is a lawyer and another brother, Thilakaratne Kuruwita Bandara is a journalist and editor.

He sat for the General Certificate of Education (GCE) Ordinary Level in 1963. After passing the senior examination, he was selected to Vidyodaya Pirivena (currently known as University of Sri Jayewardenepura) for higher studies. In 1971, he obtained a Sinhala Honours Degree (First Class).

He worked as a temporary lecturer at the University of Kelaniya in 1972. Thereafter, he served as a part-time lecturer at The Department of Aesthetics studies at the Kelaniya University from 1975-76. He moved to University of Jaffna as a Lecturer of Sinhala in 1976 and worked as a lecturer for three years. Then he returned to Kelaniya as an Assistant Lecturer on permanent basis. In 1985, Ariyaratne joined the academic staff at the University of Sri Jayewardenepura, where he was promoted as an Assistant Professor and was conferred as Professor in 1994.

In 1989 he traveled to Madras to study Tamil. In 2000, he was promoted as a Senior Professor of Sinhala Language and Mass Media in the Communication Faculty, becoming the youngest to achieve the feat in the Sri Lanka university system.

In 2011, he was awarded Doctorate in Literature from Kelaniya University. In 2015, he was honored with second Doctorate in Literature in recognition of his contributions in the field of literature and the arts.

== Career ==
At the age of 11, he wrote a school play named Amal Biso. Then, in 1961 at the age of 16, Ariyaratne published a collection of short stories called Ähinsakayo. In 1963, he wrote a collection of poems called 'Api Okkoma', a historical novel, 'Alakeshwara', in 1964 and a poetic tale, 'Siyothunta Rekawal', in 1965. He also produced the play, 'Deyyo', which was written by his elder brother Thilakaratne Kuruwita Bandara.

While as an undergraduate at Vidyodaya in 1969, Ariyaratne polished his ability where he wrote a novel, 'Jeewithaya Geethayak Wewa'. After graduating in 1971, he published a poetry book, 'Dolosmahe Pahana' along with two of his closest friends Buddadasa Galappaththi and Jayalath Manoratne. He wrote several lyrics such as Pahan Kanda (1983), Yathra (1984), Pembara lanka (1990), Madhu Badun (1994), Adaheraya (2004) and Shwetha Rathriya (2012).

Ariyaratne is an accomplished lyricist who wrote several songs for popular artists such as Nanda Malini, W.D. Amaradeva and Victor Rathnayake. Some popular lyrics made by him include: Me guru pare, Podiduwage sina welai, Buddhanu Bhawena, Oba themei kiya bayyai, Api ethata ethata pa nagala, Viyo ge gayana, Yalu bala sande and Ane kurulu kooduwata gahanna ape.

In 1970, Ariyaratne extended his repertoire towards cinema, by producing his first short film Sara Gee and subsequently another short film, Dushkara Kriya six years later in 1976. His maiden feature length direction came through 1978 feature film Anupama. With the help of Ranjith Palansuriya, Ariyaratne produced two blockbuster films, Sarungale (1979) and Siribo Aiya (1980).

As an author, he won a State Literary Award for the book on Baila and Kapirigngna. In 1985, he wrote several research papers and publications on "Gramophone Era", "Kerol Pasam Kantharu", "Mahinda Prabanda", "Manawasinghe Geetha Prabanda", "Purana Sinhala Nadagam", "Gandarwa Apadana", "Sinhala Chithrapati Geethawali". In 1991, he wrote book Demala Sahithya Ithihasaya and then translated Tamil folktale Ramayanaya in 1994. He also translated the Garcia Lorca's play Yerma along with Ediriweera Sarachchandra.

In 2002, he directed the dramatic movie Sudu Sewaneli. The film won the Sarasaviya award for the Best Director and President's Medal for the Best Script of that year.

In 2008, he released a volume Visithuruya Re Ahasa which contained all his lyrics written for films, teleplays, social events such as the Tsunami devastation, light songs for radio, cassettes and CDs.

He directed the film Uppalavanna in 2008 which was based on a reinterpreted Buddhist story similar to a Theri gatha story. The film was a blockbuster of that year and won several awards at local film festivals including Most Popular Actress, Best Actress and Music Direction. However, the movie received primarily negative reviews. Many criticized the various unnecessary characters in the movie (which do not have any role in the plot), the editing, and acting.

In 2012, he directed the film Kusa Pabha based on the 523rd story "Kusa Jataka" in the Jataka story series. The film won 12 awards at the 2013 Derana Lux Film Festival including popular actor, actress, movie, music direction, and singer.

In 2018, Ariyarante directed a historical story of Bimba Devi Alias Yashodara. It was screened on 26 April, at 85 cinema halls becoming the biggest number of the simultaneous screening in Sri Lanka. The film received mostly positive reviews from the critics.

In 2019, he directed the blockbuster film Vijayaba Kollaya which was released on 1 August in 80 cinema halls across the island. The film was an adaptation of W.A. Silva's novel of the same name. The film received positive reviews.

On 17 March 2020, he launched the second volume of Gandharwa Apadana which is a collection of 6 books written on 12 musicians.

== Awards and accolades ==
- 1996 Sumathi Awards – Best Television Lyrics award for Sankranthi Samaya
- 2002 Sarasaviya Awards – Best Film award for Sudu Sewaneli
- 2004 Sumathi Awards – Best Television Lyrics award for Ramya Suramya
- 2010 Sumathi Awards – U.W. Sumathipala memorial award
- 2011 Raigam Tele'es – Best Television Lyrics award
- 2018 Hiru Golden Film Awards – Best Lyrics award for Paththini
- 2019 Derana Sunsilk Film Awards – Blockbuster Movie of the Year award for Bimba Devi Alias Yashodhara

== Filmography ==
=== As director ===
Year	Film	Other roles	Ref.
1978	Anupama		
1979	Sarungale		
1979	Podi Mali		
1980	Siribo Ayya		
1980	Kinduru Kumari		
1981	Kolamkarayo		
1981	Bamba Ketu Hati	Lyricist	
1981	Sathara Pera Nimithi	Lyricist	
1981	Vajira		
1982	Bambara Geethaya		
1982	Jeewithayen Jeewithayak	Lyricist	
1982	Kele Mal	Lyricist	
1983	Muhudu Lihini		
1985	Mihidum Salu		
1990	Christhu Charithaya	Screenwriter	
1994	Ahas Maliga		
2002	Sudu Sewaneli	Producer, screenwriter, lyricist	
2007	Uppalawanna	Screenwriter	
2012	Kusa Pabha	Lyricist	
2016	Paththini	Screenwriter, lyricist	
2017	Ali Kathawa	Screenwriter, lyricist	
2018	Bimba Devi Alias Yashodhara	Screenwriter	
2019	Vijayaba Kollaya		
2023	Ksheera Sagaraya Kalabina		
2023	Kadira Divyaraja		
2024	Gautama Buddha Matha		

=== As lyricist ===
Year	Film	Ref.
1970	Nim Walalla	
1972	Lokuma Hinawa	
1973	Matara Achchi	
1974	Duleeka	
1974	Dinum Kanuwa	
1975	Tharanga	
1975	Amaraneeya Adare	
1975	Rajagedara Paraviyo	
1975	Desa Nisa	
1976	Madol Duwa	
1976	Diyamanthi	
1976	Hulavali	
1976	Saradielge Putha	
1976	Mangala	
1977	Sri Madara	
1977	Hariyanakota Ohoma Thamai	
1977	Maruwa Samaga Wase	
1978	Gehenu Lamai	
1979	Amal Biso	
1979	Chuda Manikya	
1979	Handaya	
1980	Ektam Ge	
1981	Thavalama	
1981	Ajasaththa	
1981	Bandura Mal	
1982	Sandaa	
1982	Sakvithi Suwaya	
1983	Kiri Suwanda	
1983	Chandira	
1984	Sasara Chethana	
1986	Maldeniye Simion	
1986	Sura Saradiel	
1987	Viragaya	
1990	Pem Rajadahana	
1991	Sthree	
1992	Umayangana	
1993	Ragini	
1994	Abhiyogaya	
1994	Ambu Samiyo	
1995	Seilama	
1995	Demodara Palama	
1996	Bithu Sithuwam	
1997	Apaye Thappara 84000k	
1997	Visidela	
1998	Anthima Reya	
1999	Mandakini	
1999	Nagaran	
2000	Indrakeelaya	
2001	Mahadena Muththai Golayo Roththai	
2001	Poronduwa	
2002	Seethala Gini Kandu	
2002	Kalu Sudu Mal	
2002	Thahanam Gaha	
2003	Sudu Salu	
2005	Sulanga	
2006	Samaara	
2008	Aba	
2008	Nil Diya Yahana	
2010	Ape Yalu Punchi Bhoothaya	
2011	Mahindagamanaya	
2012	Daruwane	
2013	Abhinikmana	
2015	Mage Yalu Malu	
2015	Address Na	
2017	Wassanaye Sanda	
2018	Adarei Man	
2018	Punchi Andare	
2018	Nidahase Piya DS	

== Sinhala articles ==
- කලා සයුර කිමිද ජීවිතය සොයා ගිය ජ්‍යෙෂ්ඨ මහාචාර්ය සුනිල් ආරියරත්න
- සැරද සුලකළ’කුරු මියුරු තෙපලෙන් රඳනා
- මගේ ප්‍රේම ගීත කලාව
- මා ඇතුලු අප කිසිම කෙනෙක් පරම පාරිශුද්ධ මිනිසුන් නොවේ
- විජයබා කොල්ලය කියන්නේ මහාර්ඝ මාණික්‍යයක්
- විජය බා කොල්ලය ආයෝජනයක්
- දොළොස් මහේ පහන දල්වා 49 වසරකට පසු
- සුනිල් ආරියරත්න ආරණ්‍යවාසී මුනිවරයෙක් නොවන ශාස්ත්‍රවන්තයා
- කලාත්මක චිත්‍රපට කිරීම සියදිවි නසා ගැනීමක්
- “පිළිමනෙලා නැති” වැනි ගීත ලිව්වේ 71 පරපුරට – සුනිල් ආරියරත්න
- වසර තුනක් මේ පිටපත කපාකොටා සකස් කළා
- තිස්ස අබේසේකරගේ සුනිල් ආරියරත්න
