= Sajitha Anthony =

Sri Lankan actor and singer

Sajitha Anuththara Anthony සජිත අනුත්තර ඇන්තනී
- Born: Conganige Sajitha Anuththara Anthony; 11 November 1991 (age 35); Colombo, Sri Lanka
- Education: Ananda College, St. Joseph's College, Colombo, University of Kelaniya
- Occupations: Actor; singer; dancer; model; TV host
- Years active: 2004–present
- Spouse: Buwinika Maneesha (m. 2019)
- Children: 2
- Father: Jackson Anthony
- Relatives: Madhavee Wathsala (sister)
- Awards: Most Popular Actor; Best Upcoming Actor
- Musical career
- Genres: Pop; R&B
- Instrument: Vocals
- Years active: 2004–present
- Label: Helanka

Conganige Sajitha Anuththara Anthony (Sinhala: සජිත අනුත්තර ඇන්තනී) (born 11 November 1991), popularly known as Sajitha Anthony, is an actor in Sri Lankan cinema, theatre and television. He started his career as a child actor in the film Sooriya Arana. Sajitha became known with his role as Saraa in the television serial Nadagamkarayo. He is also known as a singer, dancer, model and television host. He also holds an Honors Degree in Drama and Theatre Arts from the University of Kelaniya

== Personal life ==
He was born on 11 November 1991 in Colombo, Sri Lanka, the youngest child in an artistic family. His father Jackson Anthony is an actor in Sri Lankan cinema, theater, and television. Regarded as a versatile actor, Jackson has appeared before the public as a director, producer, singer, screenwriter, television host, novelist, columnist, lyricist, historian, and traveler. His mother, Kumari Sandalatha Munasinghe, is a singer and actor in Sri Lankan cinema, theater, and television.

Sajitha has an older sister, Madhavee Wathsala and an older brother, Akila Dhanuddara. Akila is an actor in cinema and television who has appeared in the popular films Siri Parakum and Address Na. Madavee is an actor in cinema and television who has appeared in the film Address Na. Madhavee is married to Milan Silva.

His uncle Senaka Titus Anthony, an actor and journalist, died on 23 October 2017 in Singapore. His uncle Sudath Anthony is also an actor in television.

He is married to his longtime partner, Buwinika Maneesha Halvitige. Their wedding was held on 18 January 2019 along with his two siblings. On 21 May 2022 the couple welcomed their first child.

== Career ==
In 2004, Sajitha began his acting career in Sooriya Arana, directed by Somaratne Dissanayake, in the role of Tikira. The film became the highest-grossing film in Sri Lankan cinema history. He made his first television appearance in the musical show "Hapan Padura". In the meantime, he played a central role in the film Aba directed by his father in 2008.

Later, he acted in the critically-acclaimed films Eka Gei Sokari, Gaadi and [Sihina Sameekarana]. In 2016, he played the lead role in a teledrama telecasted in channel Swarnawahini named, "Bohimiyanuwa" a story about radical romance, which won two awards for "Best Upcoming Actor" in 2017 at the Raigam Teleawards and Sumathi Awards. In 2018 he took on a role in Kanamadiriyo telecast on ITN TV. In 2021, he appeared in the television serial Nadagamkarayo as the main character Saraa. It has received positive reviews from critics. The series has received acclaim from critics and audiences alike, and its telecast episodes were trending on YouTube, setting a record in Sri Lankan teledrama history. He became known through the role and later was awarded Most Popular Teledrama Actor in Sumathi Awards in 2021. In the meantime, he played a central role in the film Aba directed by his father in 2008.

In 2013, he participated in the dance competition Derana City of Dance – The Ultimate Level. On 9 November 2009, he won for the Best Dance Couple at the Grand Finale of the competition. Sajitha starred in the lead role of "Kamal" in the telefilm Irai hadayi opposite costars sanjaya muramudali and Kalana gunasekara, which was released on New Year's Eve, 2024.

As a singer, he released the single "Swarnapaliye" along with Sanuka Wickramasinghe. The song was popular, receiving over four million views on YouTube.

=== Television serials ===
Year	Teledrama	Role	Ref.
2015	Bohimiyanuwa	Kalpa	
2018	Kanamadiriyo	Kanishka	
2021	Nadagamkarayo	Saraa	
2021	Adungira	Yasapala (Punchi Mahaththaya)	
2021	Metro Heena	Shanika	
2022	Lokaa	Lokaa	
2024	Baiscope	Adam	
2024	Paata Kurullo	Kevin D Fonseka	
2024	Rasa Rahasak	Sanka	
2026	Delft	Dilana	

== Filmography ==
Key
†	Denotes films that have not yet been released

Year	Film	Role	Ref.
2004	Sooriya Arana	Tikira	
2006	Kurulu Pihatu	Saman	
2008	Aba	Aba	
2019	Gaadi	Vijaya	
2020	Eka Gei Sokari	Baalaya	
2024	Sinhabahu	Sinhabahu	
2024	Sihina Sameekarana	Nisal	
2024	Doosra	Ruwan	
2025	Rani	Gayan	
2025	Kaasi Vaasi	Playback singer	
TBA	Irai Hadayi †	Kamal	
TBA	Rapist †		
TBA	18 Wanguwa †		
