= Raigam Tele'es Best Television Documentary Award =

The Raigam Tele'es Best Television Documentary Award is a Raigam Tele'es award presented annually in Sri Lanka by the Kingdom of Raigam companies for the best Sri Lankan television documentary of the year.

The award was first given in 2005.

== Award list in each year ==
Year	Program	Producer	Ref.
2004			
2005			
2006			
2007			
2008			
2009			
2010			
2011	Apuru Iskole Mahaththaya	Mayuri Wanaguru	
2012	Parlimenthuwa	Manjula Athugala	
2013	Piya Satahan	TV Derana	
2014	Wana Ali Gana Kathawak	Pujitha Dissanayake	
2015	Thawalamen Katharagamata	Kamal Kariyawasam	
2016	Rathmalana Blind School	Vikum Basnayake	
2017	AR4U	Chandima Priyanthi Premaratne	
2017	Sobadaara - Kunu Kana Ali	Anuradha Devapriya	
2018	Siyapathaka Gamanaanthaya	Jayamini Ileperuma Jayalath	
2019	Rawuma	Dilshan Lanthra	
2020	Kalu Ganga Dige	Jackson Anthony	
2021	Purawatha" Kolamba Segawunu Sthana	Dinesh Dharmaraja	
2024	Vaare	Asela Bandaranayake	
