= Gaadi =

- Film poster
- Sinhala: ගාඩි
- Directed by: Prasanna Vithanage
- Written by: Prasanna Vithanage
- Produced by: Sandya Salgado; Alan McAlex; Ajay Rai; H D Premasiri; Prasanna Vithanage
- Starring: Sajitha Anthony; Dinara Punchihewa; Shyam Fernando; Ravindra Randeniya
- Cinematography: Rajeev Ravi
- Edited by: A. Sreekar Prasad
- Music by: K (Krishna Kumar)
- Production companies: Film Island; Jar Pictures; Prasanna Vithanage Productions
- Distributed by: CEL Theatres
- Release dates: 8 October 2019 (Busan); 10 January 2023 (Sri Lanka)
- Running time: 103 Minutes
- Country: Sri Lanka
- Language: Sinhala
- Budget: $560,000

Gaadi (Sinhala: ගාඩි), also released as Children of the Sun, is a 2019 Sri Lankan Sinhala historical road film directed by Prasanna Vithanage. It is co-produced as a Sri Lankan-Indian joint production by H.D. Premasiri, Sandya Salgado for Film Island, Prasanna Vithanage Productions and Alan McAlex and Ajay Rai for Mumbai-based Jar Pictures, an Indian motion picture production company. It stars Sajitha Anthony with debut actress Dinara Punchihewa in lead roles along with Shyam Fernando and Ravindra Randeniya. Music composed by K.

It is a period drama set in 1814, during the last days of the Kandyan Kingdom. The story revolves around the journey of Tikiri who was stripped from nobility and forcibly married to an outcast by the monarchy.

Gaadi premiered on 8 October 2019 at the 24th Busan International Film Festival amidst stellar reviews. The film has been selected one of the 100 Asian films that audiences should watch by International Film Festival 2019.

In January 2020, the film won a Special Jury Award at 18th International Dhaka Film Festival.

== Plot ==
The film is set during the final years of the Kandyan Kingdom. Following a failed rebellion by Sinhala noblemen seeking to depose King Sri Wikrama Rajasinghe, a ruler of South Indian Nayakkar descent, the dissidents form an alliance with British officials who claim that their intentions are commercial rather than territorial. During a pivotal meeting between Ehelepola Adigar and John D'Oyly, negotiations take place regarding the transfer of power in Kandy. Ehelepola proposes that, should the British assist in removing the king, they would be permitted to conduct trade in the highlands, provided that the social order of the Kandyan realm remains intact. He compels D’Oyly to swear on the Bible that this order will be preserved. With the support of Bulathgama Dissave and other noblemen, Ehelepola organizes a coup. However, the uprising fails, forcing the conspirators and their followers to flee Kandy. In retaliation, the king orders punishment against the families of the rebel noblemen. The wives are given a choice between ritual suicide by drowning or being stripped of their nobility and married into the Rodiya caste, regarded as the lowest in the Kandyan social hierarchy. Most choose death, but Bulathgama’s wife, Tikiri, refuses and is declared the property of a Rodiya man named Vijaya. She is forced into the Rodiya community, whose members are compelled to wear coarse garments and visible markers of their status and must show extreme deference to upper castes. As part of her degradation, Tikiri is made to remove her blouse, symbolizing her loss of social standing. Tikiri’s presence creates tension within the Rodiya community, whose members survive through begging and are forbidden from engaging in any forms of labor. Vijaya shows empathy toward Tikiri’s suffering, and the two gradually form a quiet, unspoken bond. Eventually, they leave the group to seek a new life together. They find temporary refuge with a farmer and attempt to sustain themselves by trapping cattle in the forest. When their attempt to pass as members of a higher caste is discovered, they are punished—tied to a tree and flogged, and Tikiri is publicly humiliated once again. While in the forest, they encounter a group fleeing the advancing British forces. Tikiri suspects they are nobles in disguise, which proves correct when the man offers payment in exchange for safe passage to Kandy. Vijaya guides them, but the nobles are captured, and the man is executed. Vijaya and Tikiri are also seized but manage to escape back into the forest. By this time, the British have taken control of Kandy. The Rodiya community is captured and forced to perform for the British, despite objections from Kandyan nobles who had supported the British alliance, including Ehelepola and Bulathgama. During the performance, Tikiri recognizes her husband Bulathgama and defiantly meets his gaze. He pretends not to know her. On Ehelepola’s orders, her blouse is torn off, prompting Vijaya to intervene. The Rodiya leader creates a diversion, allowing Tikiri and Vijaya to escape. They later return to discover that the Rodiya community has been killed. The film concludes with Vijaya and Tikiri standing atop a large rock overlooking a vast valley. End titles state that the British formally annexed Ceylon on February 15, 1815, marking the end of the Kandyan Kingdom. Although colonial rule abolished aspects of the caste-based duty system, the film leaves open the question of whether genuine social liberation was achieved or merely replaced by another form of domination.

== Cast ==
- Sajitha Anthony as Vijaya
- Dinara Punchihewa as Tikiri
- Ravindra Randeniya as Ehelepola Adigar
- Shyam Fernando as Bulathgama Disawe
- Iranganie Serasinghe as Bulathgama Disawe's mother
- Damayanthi Fonseka as Bulathgama Disawe's sister
- Mohamed Adamaly as John Doyle
- Ananda Kumara Unnehe as Ukkuwa
- Nethalie Nanayakkara as Ukkuwa's mother
- Kalana Gunasekara as Village youth
- Thusitha Laknath
- Jayabalan
- Mervyn Croon
- Dishni Rajapaksa
- Denuwan Sri Bandara as Soldier
- Samila Vidanage as messenger

== International screenings ==
- 24th Busan International Film Festival in South Korea on 8 October 2019.
- 3rd I South Asian Film Festival - San Francisco on 9 November 2019.
- 21st Kerala International Film Festival on 9 December 2019.
- 18th Pune International Film Festival on 10 January 2020.
- 18th Dhaka International Film Festival on 19 January 2020.
- 49th International Film Festival Rotterdam on 26 January 2020.
- 3rd Independent Film Festival of Chennai on 9 February 2020.
- Vesoul International Film Festival on 13 February 2020.
- Bengaluru International Film Festival on 28 February 2020.

== Awards ==
- 18th Dhaka International Film Festival (Best Film - Special Jury Mention)
- 3rd Independent Film Festival of Chennai (Emerald Dove Award)
- 14th Asia Pacific Screen Awards: Cultural Diversity Award (UNESCO)
