= Raigam Tele'es Best Television Sports Program Award =

Sri Lankan television award

The Raigam Tele'es Best Television Sports Program Award is a Raigam Tele'es award presented annually in Sri Lanka by the Kingdom of Raigam companies for the best Sri Lankan television sports program of the year.

The award was first given in 2005.

== Award list in each year ==
Year	Sports Program	Producer	Ref.
2004			
2005			
2006			
2007			
2008			
2009			
2010			
2011	Story of Sri Lanka Test Cricket	Amantha Wijesuriya	
2012	Dinana Lamai	Kavindu Fernando	
2013	Dinana Lamai	Kavindu Fernando; Saranga Pathirana	
2014	Super Fighter - Boxing Finale	Sunil Somasiri	
2015	Dinana Lamai	Kavindu Fernando; Saranga Pathirana	
2016	Dinana Lamai	Kavindu Fernando; Saranga Pathirana	
2017	Gamata Kreeda	Sajith Govinna	
2018	Dinana Lamai	Kavindu Fernando; Saranga Pathirana	
2019	Derana Airtel Fastest Bowler	Ryan Uddika; Padmakumara Karunaratne	
2020	Beyond The Boundaries	Yenuka Dissanayake	
2021	Dinana Lamai	Lahiru Dushmantha; Ashan Fernando	
2024	Cricket Gamata	Jayamini Ileperuma	
