= Raigam Tele'es Best Television Current Affairs Award =

The Raigam Tele'es Best Television Current Affairs Award is a Raigam Tele'es award presented annually in Sri Lanka by the Kingdom of Raigam companies for the best Sri Lankan television current affairs show of the year.

The award was first given in 2005.

== Award list in each year ==
Year	Program	Producer	Rep.
2004			
2005			
2006			
2007			
2008			
2009			
2010			
2011	Siyabalanduwe Atha	Saman Kumara Ramawickrama	
2012	Tuberculosis program	Bertrum Nihal	
2013	Manusath Derana	Dilka Samanmalee	
2014	Bisowarunge Janapada	Namal Prasanna	
2015	Badulle Egodawela 6 Kanuwa Palama	Sanjeewa Kumara Liyadipita	
2016	Parlimenthuwa	Prasad Kumasaru	
2017			
2018	Ada Dawasa - Wasa Wisa Nathi Kesel	Anura Priyasdarshana	
2019	Illegal Immigration	Sisirakumar Krishanthraj	
2020	-	-	-
2021	-	-	-
2024	Owa Denu Parahata Kathuwekiya	Hemantha Mawalage	
