= Sumathi Best Television Lyrics Award =

The Sumathi Best Teledrama Lyrics Award is presented annually in Sri Lanka by the Sumathi Group of Campany associated with many commercial brands for the best Sri Lankan lyrics of the year in television screen.

The award was first given in 1995. In 2009, the award was not given. Following is a list of the winners of this prestigious title since then.

Year	Best Lyricist	Teledrama	Ref.
1995	Somaratne Dissanayake	Suwanda Kekulu	
1996	Sunil Ariyaratne	Sankranthi Samaya	
1997	Somaratne Dissanayake	Itipahan	
1998	Rathna Sri Wijesinghe	Nayanamina	
1999	Bandula Nanayakkarawasam	Badde Gedara	
2000	Wasantha Kumara Kobawaka	Swarna Thisaravi	
2001	Bandara Ehaliyagoda	Dakathi Muwahath	
2002	Sunil Rathnayake	Ek Murganganaviyak	
2003	Mahinda Dissanayake	Mal Nothala Malpani Bonna	
2004	Sunil Ariyaratne	Ramya Suramya	
2006	Wasantha Kumara Kobawaka	Samanala Sihinaya	
2007	Ajantha Ranasinghe	Doowili Suwanda	
2008	Wasantha Kumara Kobawaka	Sandagalatanna	
2009	-	-	
2010	Kumara Liyanage	Arungal	
2011	Rasika Suraweera Arachchi	Abarthu Atha	
2012	Suramya Mapitiya	Binari	
2013	Wasantha Kumara Kobawaka	Monara Thanna	
2014	U.B Rathnayake	Salmal Landa	
2015	Mahinda Prasad	Girikula	
2016	Jackson Anthony	Daskon	
2017	Sumith Rathnayake	Maddahana	
2018	Amila Thenuwara	His Ahasa Yata	
2019	Premakumara Jayawardena	Baddata Sanda	
2021	Mandika Dilpahan	Raavana	
