= Galahitiyawa Central College =

Galahitiyawa Central College ගලහිටියාව මධ්‍ය විද්‍යාලය

Location
- Ganemulla, Gampaha District; Sri Lanka; 7.069831719190427°N 79.95470635995898°E

Information
- Former name: •Galahitiyawa Madhya Maha Vidyalaya •Galahitiyawa Parakrama Madhya Maha Vidyalaya
- Type: 1AB National School
- Motto: Pali: Māniwaththa Abhikkhama (Stop not, Go Forward)
- Religious affiliation: Buddhism
- Established: May 1944; 82 years ago
- Founder: C. W. W. Kannangara
- School district: Gampaha
- School code: GCCG
- Principal: Udeshika Kariyawasam
- Staff: 130
- Grades: 6 - 13
- Gender: Boys and Girls
- Age range: 11 - 19
- Enrollment: 2120 (approx.)
- Campus size: 7-acre (0.028 km^{2})
- Colours: Blue, yellow, black
- Team name: Centralianz
- Alumni: PPA Galahitiyawa
- Website: galahitiyawacc.com

Galahitiyawa Central College (GCC) (Sinhala: ගලහිටියාව මධ්‍ය විද්‍යාලය) is a national school in Ganemulla, Sri Lanka, classified as one of the Central Colleges of Sri Lanka. It was established in May 1944. It is one of the original 54 Central Schools established by C. W. W. Kannangara, the Minister of Education, in the implementation of his free education scheme. Students are admitted to grade six on the basis of results of the Scholarship Examination in Sri Lanka.

== History ==
In 1944, under C. W. W. Kannangara's Central School scheme, this school was started. Galahitiyawa Central College is one of the original 54 Central Schools established on the island.

== Houses ==
The students are divided into four houses:

- Nelum (නෙලුම්) - Red
- Kamal (කමල්) - Green
- Piyum (පියුම්) - Orange
- Upul (උපුල්) - Blue

== Notable alumni ==
Name	Notability
Jackson Anthony	Actor, singer
