= Raigam Tele'es Best Television Educational Program Award =

The Raigam Tele'es Best Television Educational Program Award is a Raigam Tele'es award presented annually in Sri Lanka by the Kingdom of Raigam companies for the best Sri Lankan television educational program of the year.

The award was first given in 2005.

== Award list in each year ==
Year	Educational Program	Producer	Ref.
2004			
2005			
2006			
2007			
2008			
2009			
2010			
2011	Patibha - Karaneeya Meththa Suthra	Ranjeewani Baddevithana	
2012	Patibha - Thrilakshanaya	Ranjeewani Baddevithana	
2013	Ranga Bhoomi	Ranga Bandaranayake	
2014	Seetha Diyabamanaya	Gamini Jayantha Abeywickrama	
2015	Man Asai Mata Kiyanna	Janaka Sujeewa Jayakody	
2016	Sirasa Pentathlon	Pulindu Missaka Edirisinghe; Waruna Karunaratne	
2017	Aghatha Rogayen Midemu	Nishadi Ruwanmali	
2018	Selfie	Malathi Weerasinghe	
2019	Knowledge First - Monday	Janaka Sujeewa Jayakody	
2020	ITN Lama Vidyagaraya	Thushari Gamage	
2021	Jathika Pasala: Lena Athahera Yaama	Sunethra Kumari	
2024	Jeevithayata Vidyawa	K.C. Saranga	
