= Dheewari =

- Sinhala: ධීවරී
- Directed by: Salinda Perera
- Written by: Salinda Perera and Darrell Costa
- Based on: Novel by Raja Procter
- Produced by: Chandran Rutnam
- Starring: Sangeetha Weeraratne; Joe Abeywickrama; Jackson Anthony
- Cinematography: Lal Wickramarachchi
- Edited by: Harris Nandasiri
- Music by: Pradeep Ratnayake
- Distributed by: Ridma Circuit
- Release date: 30 September 2011
- Country: Sri Lanka
- Language: Sinhala

Dheewari (Sinhala: ධීවරී, lit. 'Fisherman's Daughter') is a 2011 Sri Lankan Sinhala drama film directed by Salinda Perera and produced by Chandran Rutnam. It stars Sangeetha Weeraratne, Joe Abeywickrama in lead roles along with Cyril Wickramage and Jackson Anthony. Music composed by Pradeep Ratnayake. The film was based on the novel Dheewari of Raja Procter. It was adapted for the screen by Salinda Perera and Darrell Costa. Singhalese translations were made during filming. It is the 1163rd Sri Lankan film in the Sinhala cinema. The film has achieved mostly positive reviews from both local and international festivals.

== Cast ==
- Sangeetha Weeraratne as Valli
- Joe Abeywickrama as Mudalali
- Cyril Wickramage as Peduru
- Jackson Anthony as Manuel
- Trilicia Gunawardena as Josie
- Veena Jayakody as Mudalali's wife
- Roger Seneviratne
- Grace Ariyawimal
- Ramani Siriwardena
- Premilla Kuruppu
- Gnananga Gunawardena
