= Raigam Tele'es Best Upcoming Teledrama Actor Award =

The Raigam Tele'es Best Upcoming Teledrama Actor Award is a Raigam Tele'es award presented annually in Sri Lanka by the Kingdom of Raigam companies for the best upcoming Sri Lankan actor of the year in television screen.

The award was first given in 2005.

== Award list in each year ==
Year	Best Upcoming Actor	Teledrama	Ref.
2004			
2005			
2006			
2007			
2008			
2009	Sumith Rathnayake	Angani	
2010			
2011	Ryan Van Rooyen	Kadagedara	
2012	Eranga Jeewantha	Piyavi	
2013	Pathum Rukshan	Sandaa	
2014	Madushan Hathlahawatte	Girikula	
2015	Ruwan Perera	Daskon	
2016	Sajitha Anthony	Boheemiyanuwa	
2017	Mayura Kanchana	Badde Kulawamiya	
2018	Andrew Pulle	Koombiyo	
2019	Randika Gunathilake	Ado	
2020	Dhanuka Dilshan	Thanamalvila Kollek	
2021	Sangeeth Prabhu	Pork Veediya	
2024	Manruchi Siriwardena	Meeya	
