= Kurulu Pihatu =

Kurulu Pihatu කුරුළු පිහාටු
- Directed by: Sumith Kumara
- Written by: Mahinda K. Premasiri
- Produced by: F.T Entertainment
- Starring: Sajitha Anthony; Jackson Anthony; Dilhani Ekanayake
- Cinematography: K. D. Dayananda
- Edited by: Elmo Halliday
- Music by: Ananda Gamage
- Production companies: Prasad Color Lab, Chennai
- Release date: 23 November 2006
- Running time: 90 minutes
- Country: Sri Lanka
- Language: Sinhala

Kurulu Pihatu (Bird Feathers) (Sinhala: කුරුළු පිහාටු) is a 2006 Sri Lankan Sinhala philosophical drama film directed by Sumith Kumara and produced by Paul Newman for F.T Entertainments. It stars Sajitha Anthony and Jackson Anthony in lead roles along with Dilhani Ekanayake and Hemasiri Liyanage. Music composed by Ananda Gamage. It is the 1165th Sri Lankan film in the Sinhala cinema.

== Plot ==
Saman is a 13-year-old innocent boy who wishes to be ordained. He is neglected by his parents, who are separated. Most of times, Saman spends time on road with his grandfather, who is a beggar. One day, He meets a monk and tells about his wish to become a monk. The monk asks him to get permission from parents. Saman returns home to get permissions from his mother, Shalika, who has remarried recently. Her husband, Charuka expels Saman from the house before Saman can meet Shalika. After that, Saman starts living with his grandfather.

Saman's father, Chandrasekara blames Shalika for Saman's missing. Shalika is worried and gets angry when Charuka calls Saman as a beggar. She quarrels with him, after which Charuka abandons her.

Rain destroys Saman and his grandfather's shelter. Exposed to the storm, they both catch pneumonia. Saman's grandfather dies. Chandrasekara finds shivering Saman on road and rushes him to hospital. Shalika apologizes from Saman for her mistakes. Then, she permits Saman to become a monk.

Finally, Saman recovers and is ordained. His parents and grandmother visit him to get blessings.

== Cast ==
- Sajitha Anthony as Saman
- Jackson Anthony as Chandrasekara
- Dilhani Ekanayake as Shalika
- Hemasiri Liyanage as Shalika's father
- Suresh Gamage as Charuka
- Seetha Kumari as Chandrasekara's mother
- Saranapala Jayasuriya
- Nanda Wickramage as Head Monk
- Sarath Chandrasiri as Waiter
- Kapila Sigera
- Muthu Tharanga as Chandrasekara's girlfriend
