= Raigam Tele'es Most Popular Teledrama Award =

The Raigam Tele'es Most Popular Teledrama Series Award is presented annually in Sri Lanka by the Kingdom of Raigam for the most popular Sri Lankan teledrama series of the year on television.

The award was first given in 2005. Following is a list of the winners of this prestigious title since 2005.

== Award list in each year ==
Year	Teledrama series	Producer	Ref.
2005			
2006			
2007	Chakrayudaya	Independent Television Network	
2008	Paba	Independent Television Network	
2009	Ithin Eeta Passe	Independent Television Network	
2010	Isuru Bhawana	Sri Lanka Rupavahini Corporation	
2011	Amanda	Independent Television Network	
2012	Sihina Piyapath	Independent Television Network	
2013	Induwari	Independent Television Network	
2014	Ranaa	Independent Television Network	
2015	Pini Muthu Wasse	Independent Television Network	
2016	Uthum Pathum	Sirasa TV	
2017	Deweni Inima	TV Derana	
2018	Koombiyo	Independent Television Network	
2019	Wes	Swarnawahini	
2020	Thanamalvila Kollek	Independent Television Network	
2021	Paara Dige	Swarnawahini	
2022	Paara Dige	Swarnawahini	
2023	Jaanu	Independent Television Network	
2024	Paata Kurullo	Hiru TV	
2025	Paata Kurullo	Hiru TV	
2026	Jahuta	Swarnawahini	
