= Raigam Tele'es Best Television Lyrics Award =

The Raigam Tele'es Best Teledrama Lyrics Award is presented annually in Sri Lanka by the Kingdom of Raigam associated with many commercial brands for the best Sri Lankan lyricist of the year in television screen.

The award was first given in 2005. Following is a list of the winners of this prestigious title since then.

== Award list in each year ==
Year	Best Lyricist	Song	Teledrama	Ref.
2004				
2005				
2006	Ajantha Ranasinghe	Doowila Siwanda		
2007				
2008	U.B.Rathnayake	A Maga waradee	Sandagalathanna	
2009	Kumara Liyanage	Karawunu Mal Sumbule	Arungal	
2010	Sunil Ariyaratne			
2011	Bandara Ahaliyagoda	Parami Dam Pura	Swayanjatha	
2012	Wasantha Kumara Kobawaka	Male Bambaru Ragana	Monarathenna	
2013	U.B. Rathnayake	Salmal Landata	Salmal Landa	
2014	Lucien Bulathsinhala	Pinwathi	Sasara Sarani	
2015	Suramya Mapitiya; Ramya Mapitiya	Mudu Sitha Sanda Renu	Ida Denna	
2016	Bandara Ahaliyagoda	Igila Yay	One Way	
2017	Jackson Anthony	Sansare Digai	See Raja	
2018	Kumara Liyanage	Ara Heen Handata	Thaththa	
2019	Manjula Wediwardhana	Sathara Abhina Kandulu	Deyyange Rate	
2020	Sudath Devapriya	Nilla Nagana Udesanaka	Sulanga Maha Meraka	
2021	Asanka Ruwan Sagara	Vane Vala Pala	Sakarma	
2024	Lakshan Vattuhewa	Mal Kekulakata Visa	Backside	
