= Raigam Tele'es Best Upcoming Teledrama Actress Award =

The Raigam Tele'es Best Upcoming Teledrama Actress Award is presented annually in Sri Lanka by the Kingdom of Raigam companies.

The award was first given in 2005.

== Award list in each year ==
Year	Best Upcoming Actor	Teledrama	Ref.
2004			
2005			
2006			
2007			
2008			
2009	Udayanthi Kulatunga	Ridee Ittankaraya	
2010			
2011	Prathibha Hettiarachchi	Senakeliyay Maya	
2012	Ruwangi Rathnayake	Ahasin Watuna	
2013	Sajana Wanigasuriya	Agni	
2014	Tharuka Wanniarachchi	Muthuketa Sihinaya	
2015	Madhavi Wathsala	Daskon	
2016	Nadeesha Rupasinghe	One Way	
2017	Buwani Chapa	Me Mamai	
2018	Theruni Ashansa Peiris	Baddata Sanda	
2019	Michelle Dilhara	Sudu Andagena Kalu Awidin	
2020	Thilakshani Rathnayake	Thanamalvila Kollek	
2021	Shashi Anjelina	Pork Veediya	
2024	Wathsala Jayasinghe	Susum Rasthiyaduwa	
