= Raigam Tele'es Best Teledrama Art Director Award =

The Raigam Tele'es Best Teledrama Art Director Award is a Raigam Tele'es award presented annually in Sri Lanka by the Kingdom of Raigam companies for the best Sri Lankan art director of the year in television.

The award was first given in 2005.

== Award list in each year ==
Year	Best Art Director	Teledrama	Ref.
2004			
2005			
2006	Ramyawardana Podinilame	Chakrayuda	
2007	Hemasiri Fernando	Uthuwankande Saradiel	
2008			
2009	Aheliyagoda Somathilaka	Ridee Ittankaraya	
2010	Bimal Roy		
2011	Deepthi Mangalasoma	Swayanjatha	
2012	Sujeewa Gunaratne	Dhawala Kadulla	
2013	Thusitha Aththanayake	Appachchi	
2014	Ranjith de Silva	Bandara Deyyo	
2015	Dhammika Hewadunne	Daskon	
2016	Aruna Medakumbura	One Way	
2017	Lakmal Weerasekara	Badde Kulawamiya	
2018	Dhammika Hewaduwatte	Minigan Dela	
2019	Ajantha Alahakoon	Sudu Andagena Kalu Awidin	
2020	Chinthaka Wijeratne	Thanamalvila Kollek	
2021	Piyatissa Akuramboda	Sakarma	
2024	Manoj Wickramasinghe	Meeya	
