= Raigam Tele'es Best Television Political Program Award =

The Raigam Tele'es Best Television Political Program Award is presented annually in Sri Lanka by the Kingdom of Raigam associated with many commercial brands for the best Sri Lankan television political program of the year in television screen.

The award was first given in 2005. Following is a list of the winners of this prestigious title since then.

== Award list in each year ==
Year	Political Program	Producer	Ref.
2004			
2005			
2006			
2007			
2008			
2009			
2010			
2011	Rathu Ira	Buddhika Kulasekara	
2012	Waadapitiya	TV Derana	
2013			
2014	Muhunata Muhuna	Nadeeka Wijeweera; Dilini Perera	
2015	Salakuna	Sudewa Hettiarachchi	
2016	Satana	Amal Tharanga Rodrigo	
2017	Waadapitiya - Saitam Arbudaya	TV Derana	
2018	Gammedda - Aruwakkalu Dump Site	Sirasa TV	
2019	Naadiya	Swarnavahini	
2020	Nidahasa	Rasika Dharmaraja	
2021	Mawatha	Lahiru Madusanka Arachchi	
2024	Satana	Danesh Upul; Susantha Seneviratne	
