= Address Na =

Address Na (No Address)
- Directed by: Jackson Anthony
- Screenplay by: Jackson Anthony
- Story by: Jackson Anthony
- Produced by: Janitha Marasinghe
- Starring: Jackson Anthony; Mahendra Perera; Kamal Addararachchi; Sabeetha Perera
- Cinematography: Channa Deshapriya
- Edited by: Pravin Jayaratne
- Music by: Rohana Weerasinghe
- Distributed by: CEL Theatres
- Release date: 23 October 2015
- Running time: 120 minutes
- Country: Sri Lanka
- Language: Sinhala

Address Na (Sinhala: ඇඩ්‍රස් නෑ, "No Address") is a 2015 Sri Lankan Sinhala-language film written and directed by Jackson Anthony. It is produced by Janitha Marasinghe and stars Jackson Anthony, Mahendra Perera, Kamal Addararachchi and Sabeetha Perera. Address Na was first released in Sri Lanka on 23 October 2015.

== Plot ==
The film begins with Nasiwatte Hitler being released from jail and resuming his criminal activities with his gang. He runs a beggar group, which includes crouched men, dumb and deaf men, disabled women and children who have to beg in many places and earn money for Hitler. Meanwhile, a rich businessmen, Sathgunawath Pinsara, plays an innocent role in public by helping poor people, but behind the scenes he is a canny person who deals with gangs such as Hitler, and Karaa. Chaplin is a deaf and dumb beggar, but not to his daughter Subha, who is a student at the law college. Subha is a courageous girl who is very loyal to her deaf and dumb father. Pinsara's son Kapila flirts with Subha to achieve her love and he proposes a program about the life of beggars for their college course. Sandya is the wife of Hitler, who has a child who was secretly moved away from her after birth. Pinsara gives a contract to Hitler and Karaa for a murder. Kara eventually kills the wrong person, and a girl named Nathalia is killed by the gunshot. Police search the gunman and capture Karaa. After torturing him, he tells them that the contract was given by Hitler and DIG (Bimal) searches for him. When all this happens, the beggar program was carried out in Naziwatte and they started to show films outdoors. Chaplin started to act like Hitler and the police capture Chaplin as Naziwatte Hitler for the death of Nathalia. But soon they realize he is not the actual person and Chaplin is released. Nathalia's boyfriend Kalinga searches for Hitler with DIG and finally captures him from Pinsara's house. Hitler is heavily drunk and tries to kill Pinsara for his dirty works, then Kapila intervenes and hits Hitler. Hitler confesses that his wife Sandya's daughter was given to Chaplin and she is Pinsara's blood. When Hitler is captured by police, Sandya is captured at the same times and Hitler told the story of her daughter and asks Chaplin about the girl. The film ends when Kapila searches for Chaplin everywhere and finally enters Subha's house. Subha smiles and Kapil sees Chaplin at the house.

== Cast ==
- Jackson Anthony as Nasiwatte Hitler
- Mahendra Perera as Hingakana Chaplin
- Kamal Addararachchi as Sathgunawath Pinsara
- Sabeetha Perera as Mudukkuwe Sandya
- Roshan Ravindra as Embilipitiye Karaa
- Darshan Dharmaraj as Gubbayame Goring
- Sheshadri Priyasad as Subha
- Akila Dhanuddhara as Kapila
- Madhavee Wathsala as Janaki
- Hemal Ranasinghe as Kalinga
- Aruni Rajapaksha as Nathalia
- Bimal Jayakody as Inspector
- Wasantha Wittachchi as Police officer
- D.B. Gangodathenna
- Anjalee Liyanage

== Soundtrack ==
No.	Title	Lyrics	Singer(s)	Length
1.	"Me Bajar Ekata Malli"	Sunil Ariyaratne	Gayan Perera
2.	"Rosa Mal Pohottu"		Nirosha Virajini
3.	"Daiwaye Saradam"		Nelu Adhikari
