= Aba (film) =

- Sinhala: අබා
- Directed by: Jackson Anthony
- Written by: Jackson Anthony
- Based on: Early chronicles
- Produced by: Justin Belagamage, Mandakini Creations
- Starring: Sajitha Anthony; Malini Fonseka; Ravindra Randeniya; Sabeetha Perera
- Cinematography: Suminda Weerasinghe
- Edited by: Ravindra Guruge
- Music by: Nadeeka Guruge
- Distributed by: EAP Theaters
- Release date: 8 August 2008
- Running time: 118 minutes
- Country: Sri Lanka
- Language: Sinhala
- Box office: 180 Million LKR

Aba is a 2008 Sinhalese film directed by Jackson Anthony and co-produced by Justin Belagamage and Rajindra Jayasinghe for Mandakini Creations. The title is derived from Pandu Aba, another name for the title character. Anthony’s son, Sajitha Anthony, portrays Pandukabhaya. The film also features Malini Fonseka, Ravindra Randeniya, Sriyantha Mendis, Sabeetha Perera and many other popular actors.

It was released in Sri Lanka on 8 August 2008. Plans were made to screen the film in several other countries, including China, Italy and Australia.

== Plot ==
Story based on the historical legend of King Pandukabhaya which is set in Sri Lanka more than 2,400 years ago.

== Cast ==
- Sajitha Anthony as Aba aka Pandukabhaya
- Ravindra Randeniya as Pandula
- Malini Fonseka as Buddhakachchana - won Sarasaviya Best Supporting Actress Award
- Sabeetha Perera as Unmaada Chitra
- Senaka Titus Anthony as Senda
- Kanchana Kodituwakku as Deega Gamini
- Saumya Liyanage as Habaraa
- Dulani Anuradha (Introducing) as Gumbakabutha - won Sarasaviya Best Actress Award
- Sriyantha Mendis as Parumukhaya
- Bimal Jayakody as Chittaraja
- Neil Alles as King Panduvasudeva
- Lucien Bulathsinhala as Abhaya
- Madhumadhawa Aravinda as Ginikhandashiva
- Kasun Chamara as Chandra
- Wasantha Dukgannarala as Maha Berana
- Priyankara Rathnayake as Yakchanda
- D.B. Gangodathenna as Astrologer

== Awards and nominations ==
The film won numerous awards in different film festivals.

=== 32nd Sarasaviya Awards ===
Year	Nominee / work	Award	Result
2008	Aba	Most Popular Film	Won
2008	Aba	Best Actress by Dulani Anuradha	Won
2008	Aba	Best Supporting Actress by Malani Fonseka	Won
2008	Aba	Best Cinematographer by Suminda Weerasinghe	Won
2008	Aba	Best Music Direction by Nadeeka Guruge	Won
2008	Aba	Best Sound Effects by Klainga Gihan Perera	Won
2008	Aba	Best Lyricist by Sunil Ariyaratne	Won
2008	Aba	Merit Award by Senaka Titus	Won
2008	Aba	Merit Award by Sajitha Anthony	Won
2008	Aba	Merit Award by Udeni Subodi Kumara	Won
2008	Aba	Merit Award by Sri Kariyawasam	Won
2008	Aba	Merit Award by Nalin Kasmira	Won

== See also ==
- List of Asian historical drama films
