= Raigam Tele'es Best Teledrama Music Director Award =

The Raigam Tele'es Best Teledrama Music Director Award is presented annually in Sri Lanka by the Kingdom of Raigam associated with many commercial brands for the best Sri Lankan music director of the year in television screen.

The award was first given in 2005. Following is a list of the winners of this prestigious title since then.

== Award list in each year ==
Year	Best Music Director	Teledrama	Ref.
2004			
2005			
2006	Premasiri Khemadasa	Punaragamanaya	
2007	Rohana Weerasinghe	Rala Bindena Thena	
2008			
2009	Sarath Wickrama	Arungal	
2010	Ravihans Wetakepotha		
2011	Navaratne Gamage	Swayanjatha	
2012	Ravibandu Vidyapathi; Priyantha Dassanayake	Amarapuraya	
2013	Kasun Kalhara	Appachchi	
2014	Rohana Weerasinghe	Chess	
2015	Samantha Perera	Daskon	
2016	Nalaka Anjana Kumara	One Way	
2017	Gayan Ganakadeera	Badde Kulawamiya	
2018	Rohana Dharmakeerthi	Thaththa	
2019	Gayan Ganakadeera	Veeraya Gedara Awith	
2020	Tharupathi Munasinghe	Sulanga Maha Meraka	
2021	Dharshana Ruwan Dissnayake	Mahapolowa	
2024	Gayan Ganakadeera	Susum Rasthiyaduwa	
