= Raigam Tele'es Best Teledrama Editor Award =

The Raigam Tele'es Best Teledrama Editor Award is a Raigam Tele'es award presented annually in Sri Lanka by the Kingdom of Raigam companies for the best Sri Lankan editor of the year in television.

The award was first given in 2005.

== Award list in each year ==
Year	Best Editor	Teledrama	Ref.
2004			
2005			
2006	Rukmal Nirosh	Olu	
2007			
2008			
2009	Tharanga Kumarasinghe	Arungal	
2010	Jagath Weeratunga		
2011	Himal Dharmaratne	Athkanda Lihiniya	
2012	Lakruwan de Seram	Piyavi	
2013	Jagath Weeratunga	Appachchi	
2014	Jagath Weeratunga	Chess	
2015	Himal Dharmaratne	Daskon	
2016	Indika Jayawardena	One Way	
2017	Jagath Weeratunga	Badde Kulawamiya	
2018	Dhamitha Chandrasiri	Koombiyo	
2019	Jagath Weeratunga	Veeraya Gedara Awith	
2020	Lakruwan de Seram	Thanamalvila Kollek	
2021	Buddhika Ranasinghe	Sakarma	
2024	Saman Elvitigala; Lakruwan de Seram	Meeya	
