= Sooriya Arana =

Sooriya Arana සූරිය අරණ
- part of the film
- Directed by: Somaratne Dissanayake
- Written by: Somaratne Dissanayake
- Produced by: Renuka Balasooriya
- Starring: Jackson Anthony; Jayalath Manoratne; Sajitha Anthony; Dasun Madusanka
- Cinematography: Channa Deshapriya
- Edited by: Shyaman Premasundara
- Music by: Rohana Weerasinghe
- Release date: 23 January 2004
- Running time: 108 minutes
- Country: Sri Lanka
- Language: Sinhala
- Box office: 12 SL Crores

Sooriya Arana (Sinhala: සූරිය අරණ) is a 2004 Sri Lankan Sinhala children's thriller film directed by Somaratne Dissanayake and produced by Renuka Balasooriya. It stars Jackson Anthony and Jayalath Manoratne in lead roles along with Sajitha Anthony and Dasun Madusanka. Music composed by Rohana Weerasinghe. It is the highest-grossing film in Sri Lankan cinema history. It is the 1025th Sri Lankan film in the Sinhala cinema.

== Plot ==
In a rural village, villagers don't have any idea about merit and demerits. Sediris, who is a hunter, often hunts animals with his son, Tikira in order to make their daily livelihood. One day, An elderly monk enters the village with his little disciple monk, who is about the same age as Tikira. They start living in a den in the village to focus on meditation. Soon, the elderly monk sees the sins committed by villagers and advises them to prevent themselves from sins to lead a happy healthy life, explaining about merits and demerits. The villagers are impressed by the kindness of the two monks and start visiting them and doing good deeds. Sediris considers the two monks a big hurdle to his hunting career and tries to chase them away, but in vain. Soon, Tikira befriends the little monk and starts hanging out and playing with him. Tikira stops hunting animals after little monk explains to him the difference between good and evil.

Sedaris anger is increased due to Tikira's sudden change. He develops more hate to the elderly monk. However, villagers start chasing Sediris on learning his conspiracy to harm two monks. Sediris ends up getting badly injured by his own trap. Despite Sediris's evil deeds, two monks help him with humankind. Eventually, Sediris realizes his mistakes and seeks forgiveness from the monks, who forgive him without thinking twice. Finally, Sediris is impressed with Buddha Dharma and stops hunting starting a happy lifestyle while Tikira becomes a monk.

== Cast ==
- Jackson Anthony as Sediris
- Jayalath Manoratne as Loku Hamuduruwo
- Sajitha Anthony as Tikira
- Dasun Madusanka as Sumedha 'Podi Hamuduruwo'
- G.R Perera as Arachchila, Village headman
- D.B. Gangodathenna as Peethara Mama
- Duleeka Marapana as Sediris's wife
- Jayani Senanayake as Sediris's concubine
- Giriraj Kaushalya as Salesman
- Ariyasena Gamage as Korala
- Pramudi Karunarathna as Tikira's sister
- Bertie Nihal Susiripala
- Nimal Jayasinghe as Guide

== Box office ==
The film received positive reviews and became the highest grossing Sri Lanka film at that time with 12 SL Crores. It successfully passed 100 days and earned Rs.11 million for 104 days at Savoya Cinema alone. At the end of May 2004, it earned Rs. 78 million island wide.

== Soundtrack ==
No.	Title	Lyrics	Singer(s)	Length
1.	"Iren Haden"	Somaratne Dissanayake	Harshana Dissanayake

== Awards and nominations ==
The film was critically adjudged by many local and international film festival and won many awards as well.

=== Houston International Film Festival ===
Year	Nominee / work	Award	Result
2008	Sooriya Arana	Silver Remi Award for the Best Feature	Won

=== Presidential Awards ===
Year	Nominee / work	Award	Result
2005	Sooriya Arana	Award for The Most Popular Film of the Year	Won
2005	Sooriya Arana	Award for The Best Lyrics	Won
2005	Sooriya Arana	Award for The Best Singer (Harshana Dissanayake)	Won
2005	Sooriya Arana	Award for The Best Make-Up (Ebert Wijesinghe)	Won
2005	Sooriya Arana	Award for The Best Sound (Shayamani Premasundara)	Won
2005	Sooriya Arana	Award for The Best Cinematography (Channa Deshapriya)	Won
2005	Sooriya Arana	Jury Award Performance (Dasun Madushanka)	Won
2005	Sooriya Arana	Jury Award Performance (Sajitha Anuththara)	Won
2005	Sooriya Arana	Award for The Best Actor (Jackson Anthony)	Won
2005	Sooriya Arana	Award for The Best Script (Somaratne Dissanayake)	Won
