= Raigam Tele'es Best Television Quiz Program Award =

The Raigam Tele'es Best Television Quiz Program Award is presented annually in Sri Lanka by the Kingdom of Raigam associated with many commercial brands for the best Sri Lankan television quiz program of the year in television screen.

The award was first given in 2005. Following is a list of the winners of this prestigious title since then.

== Award list in each year ==
Year	Quiz Program	Producer	Ref.
2004			
2005			
2006			
2007			
2008			
2009			
2010	DFCC Mind Star	Independent Television Network	
2011	Sirasa Lakshapathi	Samith Basnayake; Susantha Seneviratne	
2012	Spell Master	Dhananjaya Ramanayake	
2013	Young Inventors Club	Independent Television Network	
2014	Tokyo Cement - All Island School Quiz - Season I	Nuwan C. Jayawickrama; Dilini Perera	
2015	Tokyo Cement - All Island School Quiz - Season II	Nuwan C. Jayawickrama; Dilini Perera	
2016	Sirasa Lakshapathi	Samith Basnayake; Susantha Seneviratne	
2017	Sirasa Pentathlon season 2	Pulindu Missaka Edirisinghe; Waruna Karunaratne	
2018	Hiru Nena Kirula season 2	Tilina Amal Darshana; Chathura Jayasundera	
2019	Know Your Rights	Lakshman Mattumagala; Denisha Harshani	
2020	Sunquik Lakshapathi Warama	Susantha Kumara Seneviratne; Chandima Karunathilake	
2021	Sirasa Lakshapathi	Saman Dammika; Kanchani Pallepitiya	
2024	not given	–	
