= Raigam Tele'es Best Television Musical Program Award =

The Raigam Tele'es Best Television Musical Program Award is a Raigam Tele'es award presented annually in Sri Lanka by the Kingdom of Raigam companies for the best Sri Lankan television musical program of the year.

The award was first given in 2005.

== Award list in each year ==
Year	Program	Producer	Ref.
2004			
2005			
2006			
2007			
2008			
2009			
2010			
2011	Sadhu Naada		
2012	Gee Puja	Viraj Weliwatte; Chamara Jayaweera	
2013	Mihimadale Geethaya	Jathika Rupavahini	
2014	Feeling the Youth	Ranga Premaratne; Sunethra Kumari	
2015	Dell Studio season II	Chinthaka Gamlath; Dilini Perera	
2016	Dell Studio season III	Chinthaka Gamlath	
2017	Derana Sinhagiri Studio	Chinthaka Gamlath	
2018	Sulang Kurulllo	Shanaka Ranatunga; Viraj Hettiarachchi	
2019	Acoustica Unlimited	Janajeeva Wehella	
2020	Maathra	Amila Nuwan Wadasinghe	
2021	City of Music	Vimukthi Rodrigo; Chaminda Tennakoon	
2024	Christmas	Vimukthi Rodrigo; Sudeera Pieris	
