= Raigam Tele'es Best Television Children's Program Award =

The Raigam Tele'es Best Television Children's Program Award is presented annually in Sri Lanka by the Kingdom of Raigam organization for the best Sri Lankan television children's program of the year.

The award was first given in 2005.

== Awards list ==
Year	Children's Program	Producer	Ref.
2004			
2005			
2006			
2007			
2008			
2009			
2010			
2011	Hurubuhuti	Nalani Dharmaratne	
2012	Tomiyay Kitiyay	Athula Ransirilal	
2013		Athula Ransirilal	
2014	Kadawalalu	Athula Ransirilal	
2015	Hitiyoth Hodata Hadi Dewiyoth Namata Wadi	Athula Ransirilal	
2016	Nena Mihira	Devika Tharangani Kumarasinghe	
2017	Chithra Kamaraya	Imali Ariyawansa	
2018	Muthuhara - Nelum Vila	Udantha Kamal Gunathilake	
2019	O-Kay Art Palette	Melan Sugathadasa	
2020	-	-	-
2021	Emmy Yummy	Thusitha Vidanapathirana	
2024	Punchi Ape Shradda	Roshan Wanniarachchi	
