= Channel of the Year Award =

The Raigam Tele'es Channel of the Year Award is presented annually in Sri Lanka by the Kingdom of Raigam associated with many commercial brands for the best Sri Lankan television channel of the year in television screen, who received most awards at the ceremony.

The award was first given in 2009. Following is a list of the winners of this award since then.

== Award list in each year ==
Year	Channel of the Year	No. of Awards
2008	Independent Television Network	19 awards
2009	Independent Television Network	19 awards
2010	Jathika Rupavahini	18 awards
2011	Independent Television Network	18 awards
2012	Jathika Rupavahini	18 awards
2013	Swarnavahini	13 awards
2014	Swarnavahini	18 awards
2015	Swarnavahini	16 awards
2016	Independent Television Network	18 awards
2017	Swarnavahini	16 awards
2018	Independent Television Network	19 awards
2019	Jathika Rupavahini	18 awards
2020	Independent Television Network	14 awards
2021	Sirasa TV; TV Derana	17 awards each
