= Raigam Tele'es Best Television News Reader Award =

The Raigam Tele'es Best Television News Reader Award is presented annually in Sri Lanka by the Kingdom of Raigam associated with many commercial brands for the best Sri Lankan television news reader of the year in television screen.

The award was first given in 2005. Following is a list of the winners of this prestigious title since then.

== Award list in each year ==
Year	News Reader	Channel
2004	Sinhala -	
2004	Tamil -	
2004	English	
2005	Sinhala -	
2005	Tamil -	
2005	English	
2006	Sinhala -	
2006	Tamil -	
2006	English	
2007	Sinhala -	
2007	Tamil -	
2007	English	
2008	Sinhala -	
2008	Tamil -	
2008	English	
2009	Sinhala -	
2009	Tamil -	
2009	English	
2010	Sinhala -	
2010	Tamil -	
2010	English	
2011	Sinhala - Chethana Ranasinghe	Sirasa TV
2011	Tamil - Ifran Mohammad	
2011	English - Maheena Bonsoe	Channel Eye
2012	Sinhala - Omaya Kovilage	Sirasa TV
2012	Tamil - Jeffery Jebadarshan	MTV
2012	English - Ifthiya Abdul	Independent Television Network
2013	Sinhala - Chaminda Gunaratne	Jathika Rupavahini
2013	Tamil - J. Yogaraj	Vasantham TV
2013	English - Dulanjali Kulasuriya	Prime TV
2014	Sinhala - Uthpala Rathnayake	Hiru TV
2014	Tamil - Jeffery Jebadarshan	Shakthi TV
2014	English - Dulanjali Kulasuriya	Prime TV
2015	Sinhala (male) - Wasantha Pradeep Masinhage	Sirasa TV
2015	Sinhala (female) - Nishadi Bandaranayake	Jathika Rupavahini
2015	Tamil - Ranjani Rajaratnam	Shakthi TV
2015	English - Joel Awutskun	MTV
2016	Sinhala (male) - Madhushan de Silva	Swarnavahini
2016	Sinhala (female) - Pubudu Rathnayake	Hiru TV
2016	Tamil - K. Punyamoorthi	Vasantham TV
2016	English - Javed Bonso	Channel Eye
2017	Sinhala (male) - Nadeeka Karunanayake	Swarnavahini
2017	Sinhala (female) - Sunethra Kumari	Jathika Rupavahini
2017	Tamil - Radhika Winson	Nethra TV
2017	English - Thilina Udayaratne	Channel Eye
2018	Sinhala (male) - Kalindu Karunaratne	TV Derana
2018	Sinhala (female) - Nishanthi Dilrukshi	Independent Television Network
2018	Tamil - K. Sambhavi	Nethra TV
2018	English - Bernadine Jayasinghe	TV One
2019	Sinhala - Chanu Dissanayake Sahana Tharuka	Sirasa TV; Independent Television Network
2019	Tamil - Chandrika Arumugam	Vasantham TV
2019	English - Azra Amani Assan	TV One
2020	Sinhala (male) - Buddhi Dhanuka Abeysinghe	Hiru TV
2020	Sinhala (female) - Chavika Gunasekara	Swarnavahini
2020	Tamil - Muniyandi Kaveetha	Vasantham TV
2020	English - Jayamal Rathnayake	TV One
2021	Sinhala (male) - Randika Sapuarachchi	Sirasa TV
2021	Sinhala (female) - Uthpala Rathnayake	Hiru TV
2021	Tamil - Radhika Vincent	Nethra TV
2021	English - Tharusha Nadeera Kumarasinghe	TV One
2024	Sinhala (male) - Najith Matharage	ITN
2024	Sinhala (female) - Fathima Nazrin	Swarnavahini
2024	Tamil - Kristina Ratnam	Shakthi TV
2024	English - Theruni Ashcharya	TV One
