= Raigam Tele'es Best Television Reality Program Award =

Sri Lankan annual television award

The Raigam Tele'es Best Television Reality Program Award is presented annually in Sri Lanka by the Kingdom of Raigam associated with many commercial brands for the best Sri Lankan television reality program of the year in television screen.

The award was first given in 2008. Following is a list of the winners of this prestigious title since then.

== Award list in each year ==
Year	Reality Program	Producer	Ref.
2007	Sirasa Superstar season 1	Sirasa TV	
2008			
2009			
2010	Derana Drema Star	TV Derana	
2011			
2012	Sirasa Superstar season 3	Sirasa TV	
2013	City of Dance	TV Derana	
2014	Sirasa Superstar season 6	Sirasa TV	
2015	Jana Asuna	Sampath Basnayake; Saman Dhammika	
2016	Jana Asuna Meethotamulla Garbage Management	Sampath Basnayake; Saman Dhammika	
2017	Youth With Talent Generation Next	Sandaruwan Jayawickrama	
2018	Sri Lanka's Got Talent	Dhammika Fonseka; Waruna Karunaratne; Kumudu Abayadeera	
2019	Heta Rata	Dinesh Ambulugala	
2020	Derana Dream Star: season 9	Kelum Darshana; Krishanthi Rajika	
2021	Hiru Super Dancer: season 4	Chathura Jayasundera; Tilina Amal Darshana	
2024	Sirasa The Voice Teens	Viraj Jayamanne	
