= Eka Gei Sokari =

- එක ගෙයි සොකරි
- Directed by: Jackson Anthony
- Written by: Jackson Anthony
- Produced by: Creative Helanka (Pvt) Ltd.
- Starring: Udari Warnakulasooriya; Akhila Dhanuddara; Sajitha Anthony
- Cinematography: Channa Deshapriya
- Edited by: Tissa Surendra
- Music by: Chinthaka Jayakody
- Release date: 2020
- Country: Sri Lanka
- Language: Sinhala

Eka Gei Sokari (Polyandry with Sokari) (Sinhala: එක ගෙයි සොකරි) is a 2020 Sri Lankan Sinhala drama film directed by Jackson Anthony and produced by Creative Helanka (Pvt) Ltd. It stars Udari Warnakulasooriya and Akhila Dhanuddara in lead roles along with Sajitha Anthony and Wilson Gunaratne. Music composed by Chinthaka Jayakody.

The movie is based on an ancient Lankan marital tradition known as Eka gei Kaema (means "fraternal polyandry") as well as dance tradition Sokari. The soundtrack of the film was released in January 2020 at Savoy Theaters, Wellawatte.

== Plot ==
The story dated back to 1930s prior to Soulbury constitutional reforms. In a rural hilly village called Akiriyankumbura in Wellassa, a beautiful girl, Sedera Menike (played by Udari) is protected by her two brothers Dingira and Dungura. However, she secretly fall in love with a rebel from Monarawila lineage, Monara (played by Akila). Meanwhile, a young and energetic Sokari dancer and a folk singer called Baalaya (played by Sajitha) starts to flirt around Sedera Menike and cousin sister Dalumalee (played by Senali). The film revolves about the relationships among Sedera Menike, Monara and Baalaya.

== Cast ==
- Udari Warnakulasooriya as Sedera Menike
- Akhila Dhanuddara as Monara
- Sajitha Anthony as Baalaya
- Wilson Gunaratne
- Terry Jayasinghe
- Ruwan Perera as Dheerananda Thero
- Senali Fonseka as Dalumalee
- Ariyaratne Kaluarachchi
- Sampath Tennakoon
- Susila Kottage
- Ruwan Wickremasinghe
- Lalith Rajapaksha
- Ivan Anthony
