= Raigam Tele'es Best Television News Reporting Award =

The Raigam Tele'es Best Television News Reporting Award is presented annually in Sri Lanka by the Kingdom of Raigam associated with many commercial brands for the best Sri Lankan television news reporting of the year in television screen.

The award was first given in 2005. Following is a list of the winners of this prestigious title since then.

== Award list in each year ==
| Year | Program | Producer | Ref. |
|---|---|---|---|
| 2004 | | | |
| 2005 | | | |
| 2006 | | | |
| 2007 | | | |
| 2008 | | | |
| 2009 | | | |
| 2010 | | | |
| 2011 | Mahawa Nagollagama Gaslabu Vinashaya | Sirasa TV | |
| 2011 | Dompe Police Attack | TV Derana | |
| 2012 | | | |
| 2013 | | Hiru TV | |
| 2014 | Meeriyabedda Tragedy | Lakna Amandi | |
| 2015 | Uma Oya Project | Ashen Tharaka Gamage | |
| 2016 | Sirasa Vimarshana | Thusitha Pitigala | |
| 2017 | Ukussa - Galgamuwa Dala Puttuwa | TV Derana | |
| 2018 | Prime Time News | TV Derana | |
| 2019 | Kandakadu - Mathata Erehiwa | K. C. Saranga | |
| 2020 | Hiru CIA | Thushara Niroshan Peiris | |
| 2021 | Lanka Muhuda Kollakana Indeeya Dheewarayo | Riyaz Haris | |
