= Raigam Tele'es Best Television Presenter Award =

The Raigam Tele'es Best Television Presenter Award is presented annually in Sri Lanka by the Kingdom of Raigam associated with many commercial brands for the best Sri Lankan television presenter of the year in television screen.

The award was first given in 2005. Following is a list of the winners of this prestigious title since then.

== Award list in each year ==
| Year | Presenter | Channel |
|---|---|---|
| 2004 | Sinhala - | |
| 2004 | Tamil - | |
| 2004 | English | |
| 2005 | Sinhala - | |
| 2005 | Tamil - | |
| 2005 | English | |
| 2006 | Sinhala - | |
| 2006 | Tamil - | |
| 2006 | English | |
| 2007 | Sinhala - | |
| 2007 | Tamil - | |
| 2007 | English | |
| 2008 | Sinhala - | |
| 2008 | Tamil - | |
| 2008 | English | |
| 2009 | Sinhala - | |
| 2009 | Tamil - | |
| 2009 | English | |
| 2010 | Sinhala - | |
| 2010 | Tamil - | |
| 2010 | English | |
| 2011 | Sinhala - Samitha Prasanna Arachchi | |
| 2011 | Tamil - C. Thirubaharan | |
| 2011 | English - Sharon Mascarenhas | |
| 2012 | Sinhala - Thanuja Jayawardena | Sirasa TV |
| 2012 | Tamil - N.S. Niranjani | Nethra TV |
| 2012 | English - Indeewari Amuwatte | ART TV |
| 2013 | Sinhala - Vajira Jayawardena | Jathika Rupavahini |
| 2013 | Tamil - Hishan Mohammad | Varnam TV |
| 2013 | English - Indeewari Amuwatte | ART TV |
| 2014 | Sinhala - Nuwan Liyanage | Jathika Rupavahini |
| 2014 | Tamil - Rajendran Kogulanathan | Shakthi TV |
| 2014 | English - Indeewari Amuwatte | ART TV |
| 2015 | Sinhala - Chaminda Gunaratne | Jathika Rupavahini |
| 2015 | Tamil - Melisha Anthony Stanley | Varnam TV |
| 2015 | English - Stefanie Lasarus | MTV |
| 2016 | Sinhala - Sithara Kaluarchchi | Independent Television Network |
| 2016 | Tamil - Rajendran Kogulanathan | Shakthi TV |
| 2016 | English - Joel Awutskun | TV One |
| 2017 | Sinhala - Parami Ranasinghe | Jathika Rupavahini |
| 2017 | Tamil - Christina Grace Nadarajan | Vasantham TV |
| 2017 | English - Bernadine Jayasinghe | TV One |
| 2018 | Sinhala - Chanu Dissanayake | Sirasa TV |
| 2018 | Tamil - Praneetha Koneshwaran | Nethra TV |
| 2018 | English - Fathima Shareefa | Channel Eye |
| 2019 | Sinhala - Wasana Lakmali | Sirasa TV |
| 2019 | Tamil - Irfan Mohammad | Vasantham TV |
| 2019 | English - Mahieash Johnney | TV Derana |
| 2020 | Sinhala - Thanuja Jayawardena | Jathika Rupavahini |
| 2020 | Tamil - Srivel Raj Prasanth | Shakthi TV |
| 2020 | English - Kevin Benedict | TV One |
| 2021 | Sinhala - Thisanka Gamage | TV Derana |
| 2021 | Tamil - Rakesh Sharma | Shakthi TV |
| 2021 | English - Chanakya Jayadeva | Channel Eye |
| 2024 | Sinhala - Saranga Disasekara | Hiru TV |
| 2024 | Tamil - Pranitha Koneswaran | Nethra TV |
| 2024 | English - Naveksha Gunasekara | TV One |
