= Sumathi Best Teledrama Art Director Award =

The Sumathi Best Teledrama Art Director Award is presented annually in Sri Lanka by the Sumathi Group of Companies for the best Sri Lankan art director in television.

The award was first given in 1995. Following is a list of the winners since then.

Year	Best Art Director	Teledrama	Ref.
1995	Patric David	Dandubasnamanaya	
1996	Obeysena Ranasinghe	Andare	
1997	K.A Milton Perera; Ranjith de Silva	Pitagamkarayo	
1998	K.A Milton Perera	Wanaspathi	
1999	Hemasiri Fernando	Akaala Sandya	
2000	Ehaliyagoda Somathilaka	Gajaman Nona	
2001	Rob Nevis	Kemmura	
2002	Sujeewa Chandana	Oru Bandi Siyambalawa	
2003	Heenatigala Premadasa	Derana	
2004	Chithrasena de Silva	Bogala Saundiris	
2005	Nimal Jayavigama	Dhawala Kanya	
2006	Sujeewa Gunaratne	Wanka Giriya	
2007	Hemasiri Fernando	Uthuwan Kande Saradiyel	
2008	Ehaliyagoda Somathilaka	Kaluwara Gedara	
2009	Ehaliyagoda Somathilaka	Ridee Ittankaraya	
2010	Bimal Roy	Thaksalawa	
2011	Deepthi Mangalasoma	Swayanjatha	
2012	Suneth Nandalal	Isiwara Sanakeli	
2013	Thisitha Aththanayake	Appachchi	
2014	Chrishantha Rathnasiri	Girikula	
2015	Dhammika Hewaduwaththa	Daskon	
2016	Manjula Ayagama	Golu Thaththa	
2017	Dhammika Hewaduwaththa	See Raja	
2018	Charith Abeysinghe	Minigandela	
2019	Piyathissa Akuramboda	Ran Bedi Minissu	
2020	Suranga Kuruppuarachchi	Sansararanya Asabada	
2021	Piyatissa Akuramboda	Sakarma	
2022	Hasintha Wellawaya	Andungira	
2023	Harsha Perera; Lakmal Sandaruwan	Kodi Gaha Yata	
