= Raigam Tele'es Best Teledrama Single Episode Award =

The Raigam Tele'es Best Teledrama Single Episode Award is presented annually in Sri Lanka by the Kingdom of Raigam associated with many commercial brands for the best Sri Lankan single episode teledrama of the year in television screen.

The award was first given in 2005. Following is a list of the winners of this prestigious title since then.

== Award list in each year ==
Year	Best Episode	Producer	Ref.
2005			
2006			
2007			
2008	Christie Shelton Fernando	ITN	
2009	Sonduru Wasanthe	ITN	
2010			
2011	Sulangata Enna Kiyanna	Sirasa TV	
2012	Wadihitiyo	Jathika Rupavahini	
2013	Nuhunu Pothe Kumaraya	Hiru TV	
2014	Daruwo	Jathika Rupavahini	
2015	Kiri Suwanda	Jathika Rupavahini	
2016	Urumakkarayo	Jathika Rupavahini	
2017	Supahan Sitha - Padama	TV Derana	
2018	Mee Kooduwa	Jathika Rupavahini	
2019	Aparaarambhaya	Jathika Rupavahini	
2020	Loku Iskole Mahaththaya	ITN	
2021	Nikeles (≥55 min.); Naththal Seeya (≤55 min.)	TV Derana; Hiru TV	
2024	Mohothakata Pera	ITN	
