= Raigam Tele'es Best Teledrama Lighting & Cameraman Award =

The Raigam Tele'es Best Teledrama Lighting & Cameraman Award is presented annually in Sri Lanka by the Kingdom of Raigam associated with many commercial brands for the best Sri Lankan cinematographer of the year in television.

The award was first given in 2005. Following is a list of the winners of this prestigious title since then.

== Award list in each year ==
Year	Best Cinematographer	Teledrama	Ref.
2004			
2005			
2006	Daya Suriyarachchi	Katu Imbula	
2007	K. A. Dharmasena	Uthuwankande Saradiel	
2008			
2009	Dhammika Dissanayake	Arungal	
2010	Dhammika Rathnayake		
2011	Chinthaka Somakeerthi	Kadadora	
2012	Upul Prajan	Dhawala Kadulla	
2013	Dhammika Rathnayake	Appachchi	
2014	Thisara Thulwan	Chess	
2015	Chinthaka Somakeerthi	Kaviya Numba	
2016	Sajitha Weerapperuma	One Way	
2017	Kularuwan Gamage	Shvetha Ganthira	
2018	Striner Adams	Koombiyo	
2019	Sisikirana Pranavitharana	Sudu Andagena Kalu Awidin	
2020	Thisara Thulvan	Thanamalvila Kollek	
2021	Ravindra Samaranayake	Sakarma	
2024	Charith Abeysinghe	Chandi Kumarihami	
