= List of theatre awards =

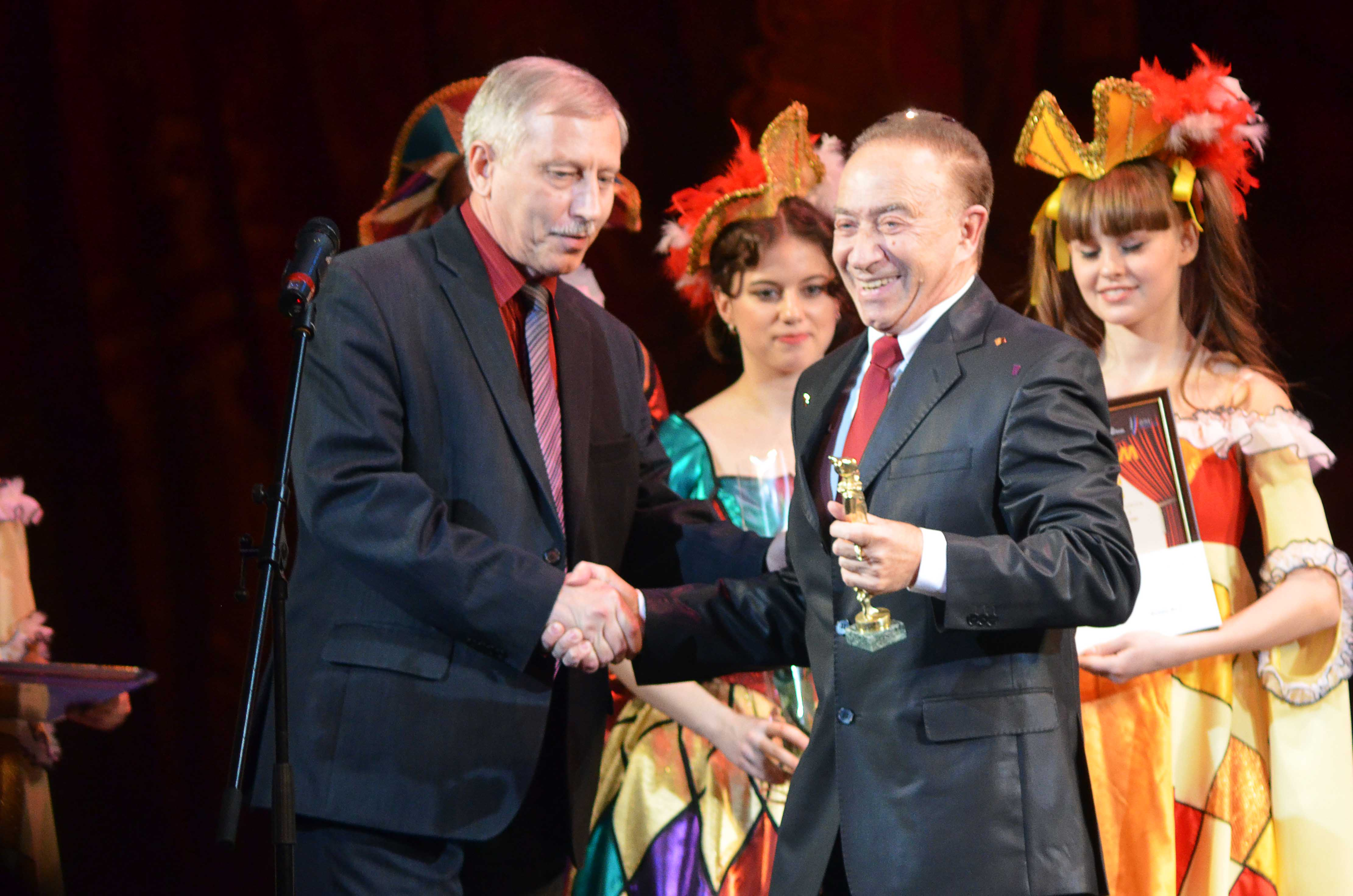
Yuri Kochnev at the presentation of the Golden Mask Award in 2014

This list of theatre awards is an index to articles about notable awards granted for theatre productions and performances. It is organized by country and region. Typically awards are only given for local productions.

== North America ==
- Pulitzer Prize for Drama
- Cappies
- Touring Broadway Awards

=== New York City, USA ===
- Tony Award (including the Regional Theatre Tony Award) (US)
- Chita Rivera Awards for Dance and Choreography (New York City, US)
- Clarence Derwent Awards (New York City, US)
- Del Hughes Lifetime Achievement Award for Excellence in the Art of Stage Management (given in New York City, US)
- Donaldson Awards (New York City, US)
- Drama Desk Award (New York City, US)
- Drama League Award (New York City, US)
- Lucille Lortel Awards (New York City, US)
- New York Drama Critics' Circle Awards (New York City, US)
- New York Innovative Theatre Awards (New York City, US)
- Obie Award (New York City, US)
- Outer Critics Circle Award (New York City, US)
- Susan Smith Blackburn Prize (New York City, Houston, TX, and London, UK)
- Theatre World Award (New York City, US)
- United Solo Award (New York City, US)

=== Other USA ===
- ariZoni Theatre Awards of Excellence (Phoenix Metropolitan Area, US)
- Back Stage Garland Awards (Los Angeles, US) (defunct)
- Barrymore Awards for Excellence in Theater (Philadelphia, US)
- Big Easy Awards for Excellence in Music, Theater and Classical Arts (New Orleans, US)
- Carbonell Awards (South Florida, US)
- Drama-Logue Award (West Coast, US) (defunct)
- Drammy Awards (Portland, OR)
- Elliot Norton Awards (Boston, US)
- Helen Hayes Award (Washington, D.C., US)
- Henry Awards (Colorado Theatre Guild, Denver, Colorado, US)
- Ivey Awards (Minneapolis–Saint Paul, US) (defunct)
- Joseph Jefferson Award (Chicago, US)
- LA Weekly Theater Award (Los Angeles, US) (defunct)
- Los Angeles Drama Critics Circle Award (Los Angeles, US)
- NAACP Theatre Awards (US)
- National High School Musical Theatre Awards (US)
- Ovation Awards (Los Angeles, US) (defunct)
- Sarah Siddons Award (for female actresses in Chicago theatre)
- The Suzi Bass Awards, (Atlanta, US)

=== Canada ===
- Betty Award (Calgary, Alberta)
- Dora Award (Toronto, Ontario)
- Elizabeth Sterling Haynes Award (Edmonton, Alberta)
- Jessie Richardson Theatre Awards (Vancouver, British Columbia)
- Masques (award) (Quebec, Canada)
- Montreal English Theatre Awards - METAs (Montreal, Quebec)
- Rideau Awards (Ottawa, Ontario)
- Robert Merritt Awards (Halifax, Nova Scotia)
- Siminovitch Prize in Theatre (Canada)

=== Mexico ===
- Premios Metropolitanos de Teatro (Mexico City)

== Europe ==
=== London, UK ===
- Laurence Olivier Awards (United Kingdom)
- Critics' Circle Theatre Awards (United Kingdom)
- National Dance Awards (United Kingdom)
- Clarence Derwent Awards (United Kingdom)
- Standard Theatre Awards (United Kingdom)
- The Stage Theatre Awards (United Kingdom)
- Backstage Awards (London, UK)
- WhatsOnStage Awards

=== Other UK ===
- Theatre Awards UK
- Total Theatre Awards (Edinburgh, Scotland)
- Critics' Awards for Theatre in Scotland (Scotland)
- Manchester Evening News Annual Drama Awards (United Kingdom)
- UK Pantomime Awards

=== France ===
- Masque d’Or, (France)
- Molière Award (France)

=== Ireland ===
- All-Ireland Drama Festival (amateur)
- Irish Theatre Awards (professional)

=== Italy ===
- Premio Ubu
- Le Maschere Awards
- Flaiano Prizes

=== Greece ===
- Karolos Koun Theatre Awards
- Dimitris Horn Award, for best young actor
- Melina Mercouri Award, for best young actress

=== Iceland ===
- Gríman - The Icelandic Theatre Awards

=== Norway ===
- Hedda Award
- The International Ibsen Award (Oslo, Norway)
- Leonard Statuette

=== Poland ===
- Witkacy Prize - Critics' Circle Award, for outstanding achievements in the promotion of Polish theatre throughout the world (Polish Centre of ITI)
- Tadeusz Boy-Żeleński Award, for achievements in theatre (Polish Centre of AICT/IATC)
- Konrad Swinarski Award, for best director (awarded by "Theatre" magazine)
- Aleksander Zelwerowicz Award, for best actress or actor (awarded by "Theatre" magazine)

=== Turkey ===
- Bedia Muvahhit Theatre Awards (http://www.bediaodulleri.com) (İzmir, Turkey)
- Afife Jale Theatre Awards

=== Other Europe ===
- Golden Globes (Portugal)
- Dosky Awards (Slovakia)
- Eugene O'Neill Award (Sweden)
- Europe Theatre Prize (Europe)
- Golden Mask Award (Russia)
- Croatian Theatre Awards (Croatia)
- Hans-Reinhart-Ring (Switzerland)
- Hedda Award (Norway)
- Irish Times Theatre Awards (Irish Republic and Northern Ireland)
- Musical Awards Gala (Netherlands)
- The Statuette of Joakim Vujić (Kragujevac, Serbia)
- Ikar Awards (Bulgaria)
- Tor Vergata Award (Italy)
- Lithuanian stage golden cross (Lithuania)

== Oceania ==
=== Australia ===
- Helpmann Awards (Australia)
- Green Room Awards (Melbourne, Australia)
- Matilda Awards (Brisbane, Australia)
- Sydney Theatre Awards (Sydney, Australia)

=== New Zealand ===
- Chapman Tripp Theatre Awards (Wellington)
- Ngā Whakarākei O Whātaitai / Wellington Theatre Awards (Wellington)
- Dunedin Theatre Awards (Dunedin)

== Africa ==
=== South Africa ===
- Fleur du Cap Theatre Awards (Cape Town)
- Naledi Theatre Awards (Gauteng)

== Asia ==
=== Hong Kong ===
- Hong Kong Drama Awards

=== India ===
- Nataka Kalasarathy
- Sangeet Natak Academy Award (India)
- Yuwaraj of Theatre Awards, presented by Swatantra Theatre, India

=== Korea ===
- Baeksang Arts Awards (Theatre Section)
