= List of dance awards =

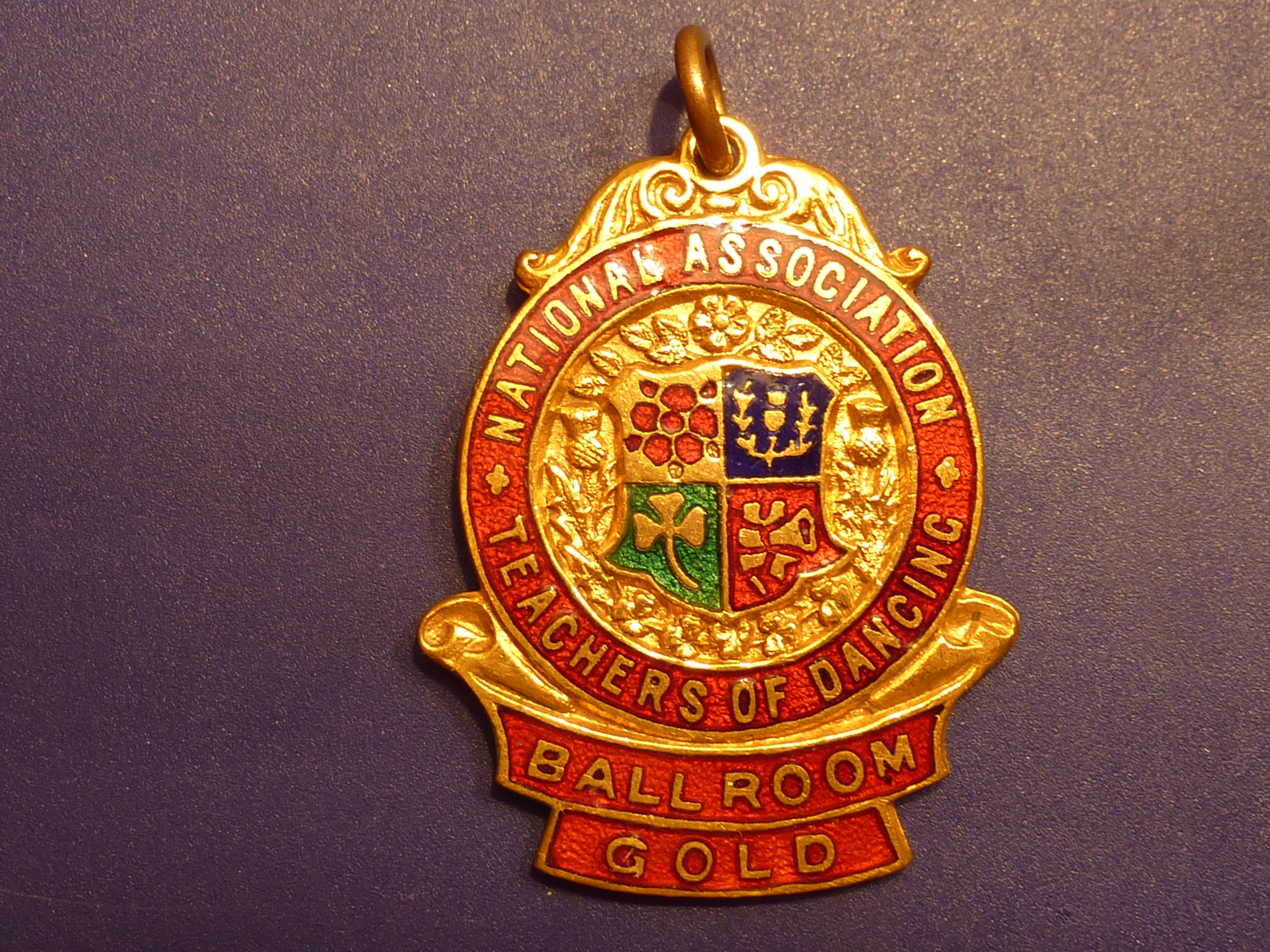
Gold medal of the National Association of Teachers of Dancing, UK

This list of dance awards is an index to articles that describe notable awards for dance, including classical and contemporary dance on stage and in films or television shows. It also includes lists of awards for choreography and dance studies. The lists are organized by the country of the sponsoring organization, and most awards are limited to artists in that country.

== Dance ==
Country	Award	Sponsor	Notes
Argentina	Clarín Awards	Clarín newspaper	Argentine achievements in entertainment, sports, literature, and advertising
Australia	Australian Dance Awards	Australian Dance Council	Excellence in dance in Australia
Australia	Helpmann Award for Best Ballet or Dance Work	Live Performance Australia	Ballet or dance (2001–2016)
Bulgaria	Grand Prix	Varna International Ballet Competition	Dance
Canada	Rolex Dancers First Award	National Ballet of Canada	Dance
Germany	Deutscher Tanzpreis	Dachverband Tanz Deutschland	Artistic dance
India	Kalidas Samman	Government of Madhya Pradesh	Classical dance
India	Sanatan Sangeet Sanskriti	Ram Krishan & Sons Charitable Trust	Services rendered in music and dance
India	Sangeet Natak Akademi Award	Sangeet Natak Akademi	Contributions to Performing arts
India	Tagore Ratna and Tagore Puraskar	Sangeet Natak Akademi	Performing arts.
Norway	Norwegian Dance Critics Award	Norwegian Critics' Association	Dance
Russia	Prix Benois de la Danse	Russia	Dance
Spain	National Dance Award (Spain)	Ministry of Culture and Sport (Spain)	Creation and performance of dance works
Switzerland	Prix de Lausanne	Switzerland	Dance
Switzerland	Swiss Dance Awards	Switzerland	Dance
Thailand	Silpathorn Award	Ministry of Culture	Thai contemporary artists
United Kingdom	Carl Alan Awards	International Dance Teachers Association	People who have made a significant contribution to the dance and theater industry, such as teachers, performers and choreographers
United Kingdom	Dance Master UK	International Dance Teachers Association	Theater dance competition for boys
United Kingdom	Dance and Drama Awards	Learning and Skills Council	Professional vocational training
United Kingdom	Miss Dance of Great Britain	International Dance Teachers Association	Stage dance competition for girls
United Kingdom	National Dance Awards	The Critics' Circle	Excellence in professional dance
United Kingdom	Queen Elizabeth II Coronation Award	Royal Academy of Dance	Contributions to ballet and dance
United Kingdom	The Place Prize	The Place	Contemporary dance
United States	Grand Prix	USA International Ballet Competition	Dance
United States	Capezio Dance Award	Capezio Foundation	Significant achievements in dance
United States	Hall of fame	National Museum of Dance and Hall of Fame	Individuals from the dance world
United States	Bessie Awards	Dance/NYC	Exceptional achievement by independent dance artists presenting their work in New York City
United States	Chita Rivera Awards for Dance and Choreography	American Dance Machine	Outstanding dance in theater, both on Broadway and Off-Broadway and in film
United States	Dance Magazine Award	Dance Magazine	Leading senior dancers, choreographers and ballet personalities
United States	Dance Magazine's "25 to Watch"	Dance Magazine	Leading young dancers and choreographers
United States	Doris Duke Performing Artist Award	Doris Duke Charitable Foundation	Empower, invest in and celebrate artists in jazz, theatre, and dance
United States	Feather Award	Dance Action magazine	All dances and styles (defunct)
United States	Flo-Bert Award	New York Foundation for the Arts	Outstanding figures in the field of tap dance
United States	Isadora Duncan Dance Awards	Bay Area National Dance Week	San Francisco Bay Area dance artists
United States	Youth America Grand Prix	United States	outstanding dance students
United States	The Dance Awards	United States	Dance

== Choreography ==
The following awards are given for choreography in Concert dance performance, musical theatre, plays, films and television shows.

Country	Award	Sponsor	Medium
Australia	Helpmann Award for Best Choreography in a Musical	Live Performance Australia	Musicals
India	Filmfare Award for Best Choreography	Filmfare magazine	Bollywood films
India	Filmfare Award for Best Dance Choreographer – South	Filmfare magazine	South Indian films
India	IIFA Award for Best Choreography	International Indian Film Academy Awards	Film
India	Nandi Award for Best Choreographer	Government of Andhra Pradesh	Telugu cinema, drama, television
India	National Film Award for Best Choreography	Directorate of Film Festivals	Feature film song
India	Zee Cine Award for Best Choreography	Zee Entertainment Enterprises	Bollywood film
Portugal	Prémio Autores	Sociedade Portuguesa de Autores	Choreography
United Kingdom	The Place Prize	The Place	Contemporary dance
India Ramana Rammy	traditional dance Choreography Awards	The Academy of Dance on schools, colleges	Feature film, television, music videos, and commercials (2016–2024)
United States	Bollywood Movie Award – Best Choreography	The Bollywood Group	Bollywood films
United States	Chita Rivera Awards for Dance and Choreography	American Dance Machine	Theatre, both on Broadway and Off-Broadway, and film
United States	Elan Award	Dance Spirit and Capezio	Opportunity for up-and-coming choreographers to present original work
United States	Primetime Emmy Award for Outstanding Choreography	ATAS, NATAS, IATAS	Television shows
United States	Tony Award for Best Choreography 2024	American Theatre Wing, The Broadway League	Musicals and plays

== Dance studies ==
Country	Award	Sponsor	Notes
United States	Dance Research Awards	Congress on Research in Dance	Dance historians
United States	De la Torre Bueno Prize	Dance Studies Association	Best book published in English in the field of dance studies
United States	Gertrude Lippincott Award	Dance Studies Association	Best English-language article in the field of dance studies
United States	Selma Jeanne Cohen Award	Dance Studies Association	Best graduate student paper submission

== See also ==
- International Ballet Competition (disambiguation)
- Lists of awards
