= Raigam Tele'es Best Teledrama Makeup Artist Award =

The Raigam Tele'es Best Teledrama Director Award is presented annually in Sri Lanka by the Kingdom of Raigam to the best Sri Lankan television Makeup Artist of that year.

The award was first given in 2005. A list of the winners:

== Award list in each year ==
Year	Best Make-up	Teledrama	Ref.
2007	Nalin Premathilaka	Katu Imbula	
2008	Sathira Dinesh Kumara; J. Suranimala	Uthuwankande Saradiel	
2009	Wasantha Vittachchi	Ridee Ittankaraya	
2010			
2011	Nalin Premathilake; Pujitha Sandadura	Swayanjatha	
2012	Sunethra Rajakarunanayake	Dhawala Kadulla	
2013	Harsha Manjula	Appachchi	
2014	Sanjaya Nipuna Arachchige	Bandara Deyyo	
2015	Priyantha Wanninayake	Bhawanthara	
2016	Wasantha Vittachchi	One Way	
2017			
2018	Nalin Premathilake; Harsha Manjula	Minigan Dela	
2019	Buwaneka Ranawaka	Raavana	
2020	Wasantha Poornawansa	Thanamalvila Kollek	
2021	Vidura Shanaka Abeydheera	Sakarma	
2024	Buwaneka Ranawaka	Chandi Kumarihami	
