= Jackson Anthony =

Sri Lankan actor (1958–2023)

- ජැක්සන් ඇන්තනී
- Jackson's portrait in an album
- Born: Conganige Joseph Malsi Jackson Anthony; 8 July 1958; Podiwee Kumbura, Ragama, Ceylon
- Died: 9 October 2023 (aged 65); Colombo, Sri Lanka
- Other names: Panaputhra Kuhumbupaniya, Sakalakala Sakwithi
- Education: Hapugoda Junior School; St. Mary's College, Bandarawela; Galahitiyawa Central College; University of Colombo; University of Sri Jayewardenepura
- Occupations: Creative director, film producer, actor, singer, painter, dancer, lyricist, columnist, novelist, dubbing artist, television host, historian, traveler
- Years active: 1987–2022
- Spouse: Kumari Munasinghe (m. 1987)
- Children: Madhavee Wathsala; Akila Dhanuddara; Sajitha Anthony

Conganige Joseph Malsi Jackson Anthony (as ජැක්සන් ඇන්තනී; 8 July 1958 – 9 October 2023), commonly known as Jackson Anthony, was a Sri Lankan actor in film, theatre and television. He was referred to as Sakalakala Sakwithi in Sinhala cinema 'King of All Arts'. Also considered one of the greatest actors in Sinhala cinema and one of the most popular artists in Sri Lanka, Anthony won the award for the Best Actor a record sixteen times. Primarily active as an actor in all three media, he appeared before the public in versatile forms; director, producer, singer, screenwriter, television host, novelist, columnist, lyricist, historian and traveller.

== Early life and education ==
Conganige Joseph Malsi Jackson Anthony was born on 8 July 1958 in Podiwee Kumbura village, Ragama, Sri Lanka. While he was recognized as "Jackson" by many people, his parents used to call him "Malsi". He received his primary education at Hapugoda St. Mary's Junior School and St. Mary's College in Bandarawela and later entered Galahitiyawa Central College in Ganemulla. For higher education he attended the University of Colombo where he first obtained an honors degree in Sinhala language and Literature and did his master's degree in Mass media at University of Sri Jayewardenepura. He is of a lineage of South Indian migrant origins.

Anthony often remembered his father, Konganige Benedict Anthony and his mother Podivee Kumbure Rolin Perera as the mammoth pillar of his success. Jackson's parents lived in his hometown Podiweekumbura, Ragama. His grandfather was Peduru Anthony, who worked as an overseer at Ceylon Electricity Board. He hails from a family of 5 brothers. his elder brother, Senaka Titus Anthony was a journalist for several medias. and his other brothers are Sudath Anthony, Saman Anthony, and Mohan Anthony. On 23 October 2017 in Singapore, his elder brother Senaka Titus died due to kidney and liver failure.

== Drama career ==
Anthony acted extensively in several stage dramas in university stage. Then he performed in the Neville Dias Subasinghe's Vaaruwen Yana Minissu and Manavayo as well as E. M. D. Upali's Methanin Maruwenu. Then he performed in many popular stage plays such as Marasad, Madhura Jawanika, Loma Hansa, Dhawala Beeshana, Ath, Mora and Tharavo Igilethi which brought him island wide recognition in the field of cinema. He was also the Best Actor at the National Drama Festival.

In 1993 he came to film industry. Having acted in Guru Gedara, Chitti, Ayoma and Loku Duwa, in his initial days, Jackson went on to prove his status in films like Bawa Duka, Bawa Karma, Gini Awi Saha Gini Keli, Aswesuma, Agni Dahaya, Sooriya Arana, Mille Soya and Randiya Dahara. In the meantime, he came to terms with television as well. These fields helped him establish his own identity as an actor. Some of his most popular television roles came through the serials: Palingu Manike, Ella Langa Walawwa, Suseema, Weda Hamine, Kadulla, Pitagamgarayo and Akala Sandya. Of these, he won the award for the Best Actor at the Sumathi Awards for his performance in the serial Pitagamkarayo. In the movie Tharanaya, he played the role of a train man named "Thangappan" and practiced dark magic. He learned low country dance from Sedaraman Gurunnance of Handapangoda for his performance in the film Bawa Duka. He learned the difference between a hunter and a shooter while acting for the film Sooriya Arana.

In 1992, he directed his maiden teledrama Esala Kaluwara. In 1990, a drama festival called 'Bhumika 7' featured seven of Anthony's best plays which allowed scholarly fans to experience Jackson's wide range of theatrics. Then in 2014, he made second teledrama direction Daskon which later won several awards at several local award festivals. During his acting career he has garnered more than 20 Best Actor Awards at local award ceremonies such as Sarasavi Awards, Presidential Awards and OCIC Awards.

Anthony also directed several blockbuster Sri Lankan films. His directorial debut, Julietge Bhumikawa won him the award for the Most Promising Director at the Critics' Awards Ceremony. Paradeesaya was another film directed by him which was critically acclaimed. His direction Aba, allegedly an expensive movie has been made in Sri Lanka and been awarded in many film festivals. He won award for the Best Actor in Derana Film Awards 2015 for the film Address Na, which was directed by him. In 2017, he joined a Kerala cinema production Lucknow directed by Anil Kumar along with another Sri Lankan Piumi Hansamali.

=== Stage drama ===
- Bera Handa
- Ath
- Oththukaraya
- Methanin Maruwenu
- Lomahansa
- Tharavo Igilethi
- Madhura Javanika
- Maha Samayama
- Dhawala Bheeshana
- Tharawo Igilethi

=== Songs ===
- Sithe Susum Niwana Gayana performed with Clarence Wijewardena
- Dasa Piya Gath Kala Mata performed with Clarence Wijewardena
- Lande Ukula Uda performed with wife Kumari Munasinghe
- Bandara Deiyo Tele Drama theme Song
- Dewathawan sithana dewal performed with Clarence Wijewardena
- Ra Ra Tharakawo performed with Clarence Wijewardena
- Ahasa Polowa Uhulanawalu with his family members

== Other careers ==
Anthony was the Winner of the People's award for the best artist at the Awards Ceremony of the Sri Lanka Institute of Marketing (SLIM) 2007. Jackson Anthony served as the Creative Director of Swarnavahini in early 2000s and produced popular musical program Hapan Padura. He is acclaimed for his concept and presentation of Maha Sinhalaye Vansa Kathawa (translated as The Chronicle of the Great Sinhalese) and Maha Sinhalaye Yatath Vijitha Vansa Kathawa, telecast through Swarnavahini for several years. Other popular programs created by him include exploratory programs like Awaare Siripa, Ganga Dige, (an exploration of the water bodies in the island around Mahaweli River), Roma Puranaya, a travel program revealing the history and civilization of Italy and Salang Hanthe, (a travel program revealing the history and civilization of Lesotho).

In addition cinema, he worked with Clarence Wijewardena; one of the most respected Sri Lankan musicians in Sinhalese music, as a supporting singer for a Sinhala teledrama called Suseema. He sang two popular songs with Clarence, Sithe Susum and Desa Piya Gathkala.

Anthony was one of three judges of Sri Lanka's Got Talent reality program, which is telecast on Sirasa TV. In January 2020, he launched his book Kanda Uda Gindara. On 22 July 2020, he started the second travelling documentary along the Kalu Ganga titled Kalu Ganga Dige.

== Personal life ==
Anthony was married to his long time partner Kumari Munasinghe, who is also an actress and a singer. They had two sons and a daughter and the family was settled in Kadawatha, a Colombo suburb. The daughter, the eldest of three siblings, Madhavee Wathsala, is a television presenter, actress and a singer. The elder son, Akila Dhanuddara, also is a television presenter, model and actor. His youngest son, Sajitha Anuththara is also a television presenter, singer and award-winning actor who has played the role of the hunter's son in Sooriya Arana. Sajitha is a graduate at University of Kelaniya. He also played the title role in his father's big-budget film Aba. All three children celebrated their wedding ceremony on 18 January 2019.

Anthony was a Catholic but an enthusiast of Buddhist studies. He conducted a show on Sri Lankan Buddhist history and a discussion program on the Buddhist channel.

=== Accident and death ===
On 2 July 2022, Anthony along with his younger brother Saman Anthony and a friend had been hospitalised following an accident at Thalawa in Anuradhapura after the vehicle they were travelling in collided with a wild elephant at Thalawa. The incident took place when he was returning in his personal vehicle after taking part in the shooting of the movie Sinhabahu, directed by Dr. Somaratne Dissanayake. He was admitted to the Anuradhapura Teaching Hospital on the same day and to the Emergency Department of the Colombo National Hospital on the morning of 3 July. At the Colombo National Hospital, he underwent a seven-hour surgery in the intensive care unit. Anthony remained in intensive care, on a ventilator donated by his family, for 458 days (15 months), until 9 October 2023 when he died as a result of his injuries at the age of 65.

== Filmography ==
=== As actor ===
Key
†	Denotes films that have not yet been released

Year	Film	Role	Notes	Ref.
1993	Guru Gedara	Sunanda		
1995	Chitti			
1995	Ayoma	Wilson		
1996	Loku Duwa	Wickrama		
1997	Punaruthpaththiya	Sediris		
1997	Bawa Duka	Peduru		
1997	Visidela	Nimal		
1998	Bawa Karma	Peduru		
1998	Tharanaya	Thangappan		
1998	Gini Avi Saha Gini Keli	Tunmulle Padme		
2001	Aswesuma	Sediris		
2002	Agnidahaya	Punchirala		
2004	Mille Soya	Somson		
2004	Sooriya Arana	Sediris Vedda		
2004	Randiya Dahara	Lionel		
2005	Guerilla Marketing	Gregory Mahadikaram		
2006	Dheewari	Manuel		
2006	Kurulu Pihatu	Chandrasekara		
2010	Kshema Bhoomi			
2011	Dheewari	Manuel		
2012	Kusa Pabha	King Kusa		
2015	Pravegaya	Brando		
2015	Maharaja Gemunu	King Elara		
2015	Ahlepola Kumarihami	King Sri Vikrama Rajasinha		
2015	Address Na	Nasiwatte Hitler		
2017	Dharmayuddhaya	Harishchandra		
2018	Gharasarapa	Gharasarapa aka Kalu Kumara		
2018	Udumbara	Coach Ananda		
2019	Vishama Bhaga	Hemachandra		
2020	Rookada Panchi	Uncle Louis		
2023	Dada Ima	Keerthi Gajanayake		
2023	Ksheera Sagaraya Kalabina	Emperor		
2024	Seeruwen	Retired Army Officer		
TBA	Lucknow †			

=== As director ===
Year	Film
1998	Julietge Bhumikawa
2008	Aba
2015	Address Na
2020	Eka Gei Sokari

== Awards ==
=== "Gampaha 80" Drama Festival ===
Year	Nominee / work	Award	Result
1980		Best Actor	Won
1980		Best Script	Won
1980		Best Production	Won

=== National Drama Festival ===
Year	Nominee / work	Award	Result
1983	Methanin Maruwenu	Best Supporting Actor	Won
1986	Maratsade	Best Actor	Won

=== Divaina Sama Drama Festival ===
Year	Nominee / work	Award	Result
1987	Maratsade	Best Actor	Won

=== Wijaya Rupavahini Awards ===
Year	Nominee / work	Award	Result
1987	Kadulla	Best Actor	Won

=== UNDA Awards ===
Year	Nominee / work	Award	Result
1991	Kadulla	Best Actor	Won
1992	Mahamera Pamula	Best Script	Won
1996	Akhala Sandyaa	Award of Excellence for Acting	Won

=== Sumathi Awards ===
Year	Nominee / work	Award	Result
1997	Pitagamkarayo	Best Actor	Won
2002	Maha Sinhale Wansakathawa	Award of Excellence for Media	Won
2004	Yeheli	The Best Current Event	Won
2008	Ganga Dige	The Best Magazine Program	Won
2008	Neighbor Talks	Award of Excellence for Media	Won
2016	Daskon	Best Teledrama	Won
2016	Daskon	Best Teledrama Director	Won
2016	Daskon	Best Teledrama Script	Won
2018	See Raja	Best Teledrama Director	Won
2018	See Raja	Best Teledrama Script	Won

=== Mass Media Awards ===
Year	Nominee / work	Award	Result
2006	Maha Sinhale Wansakathawa	The Best Television Programme	Won
2006		The Best Television Presenter	Won

=== Critic Awards ===
Year	Nominee / work	Award	Result
1995	Punuruppaththiya	Best Actor	Won
1996	Julietge Bhoomikawa	Most Promoting Director	Won
1997	Gini Awi Saha Gini Keli	Best Actor	Won

=== SIGNIS OCIC Awards ===
Year	Nominee / work	Award	Result
1996	Loku Duwa	Best Actor	Won
1997	Bawa Karma & Bawa Duka	Best Actor	Won
2002	Agnidaahaya	Outstanding Performance	Won
2005	Randiya Dahara	Outstanding Performance	Won
2005	Garilla Marketing	Outstanding Performance	Won

=== Sarasaviya Awards ===
Year	Nominee / work	Award	Result
1996	Ayoma	Merit Awards	Won
1997	Bawa Duka	Best Actor	Won
2004	Randiya Dahara	Best Actor	Won
2005	Milla Soya	Best Supporting Actor	Won
2015	Maharaja Gemunu	Best Actor	Won

=== Presidential Awards ===
Year	Nominee / work	Award	Result
1997	Julietge Bhoomikawa	Special Jury Awards	Won
1997	Bawa Duka	Best Actor	Won
1998	Gini Awi Saha Gini Keli	Best Actor	Won
1998	Aswesuma	Best Actor	Won
2001	Sooriya Arana	Best Actor	Won
2005	Garilla Marketing	Best Actor	Won

=== Top Ten Awards ===
Year	Nominee / work	Award	Result
1997	Agnidaahaya	Cultural Achievement	Won

=== People's Awards ===
Year	Nominee / work	Award	Result
2007	People's vote	People's Artist of the Year	Won
2007	Aba	People's Film of the Year	Won

=== Raigam Tele'es Awards ===
Year	Nominee / work	Award	Result
2014	Appachchi	Best Actor	Won
2015	Daskon	Best Drama Script	Won
2015	Daskon	Best Drama Direction	Won
2015	Daskon	Best Teledrama of the Year	Won

=== Lux Derana Film Awards ===
Year	Nominee / work	Award	Result
2016	Address Na	Best Actor	Won
2018	Dharmayuddhaya	Best Actor	Won
2019		Most Popular Actor	Won

=== Hiru Golden Film Awards ===
Year	Nominee / work	Award	Result
2016	Maharaja Gemunu	Jury's Award of Excellence	Won

=== Asian Film Festival ===
Year	Nominee / work	Award	Result
2019	Vishama Bhaga	Best Actor	Won

=== Fox International Film Festival ===
Year	Nominee / work	Award	Result
2020	Vishama Bhaga	Best Supporting Actor	Won

== Articles ==
- මම කවදහරි මැරෙන්නෙ කලාකරුවෙකු හැටියට
- "He is better than others"
- ජැක්සන්ට ලැබුණු ලොකුම උපන්දින තෑග්ග
- නව යුවළත්‍රයට 'සරසවිය' සුබපැතුම්
- ජැක්සන්ගේ මුල්ම විදෙස් සම්මානය රැගෙන එයි
- කුණාටුව අහවර වනතුරු මම කුඹගහ බදාගෙන ඉන්නවා
- මාධ්‍ය තුනේම හොඳම නළුවා ජැක්සන් ඇන්තනී
