= Wickrama Bogoda =

Sri Lankan actor

Wickrama Bogoda වික්‍රම බෝගොඩ
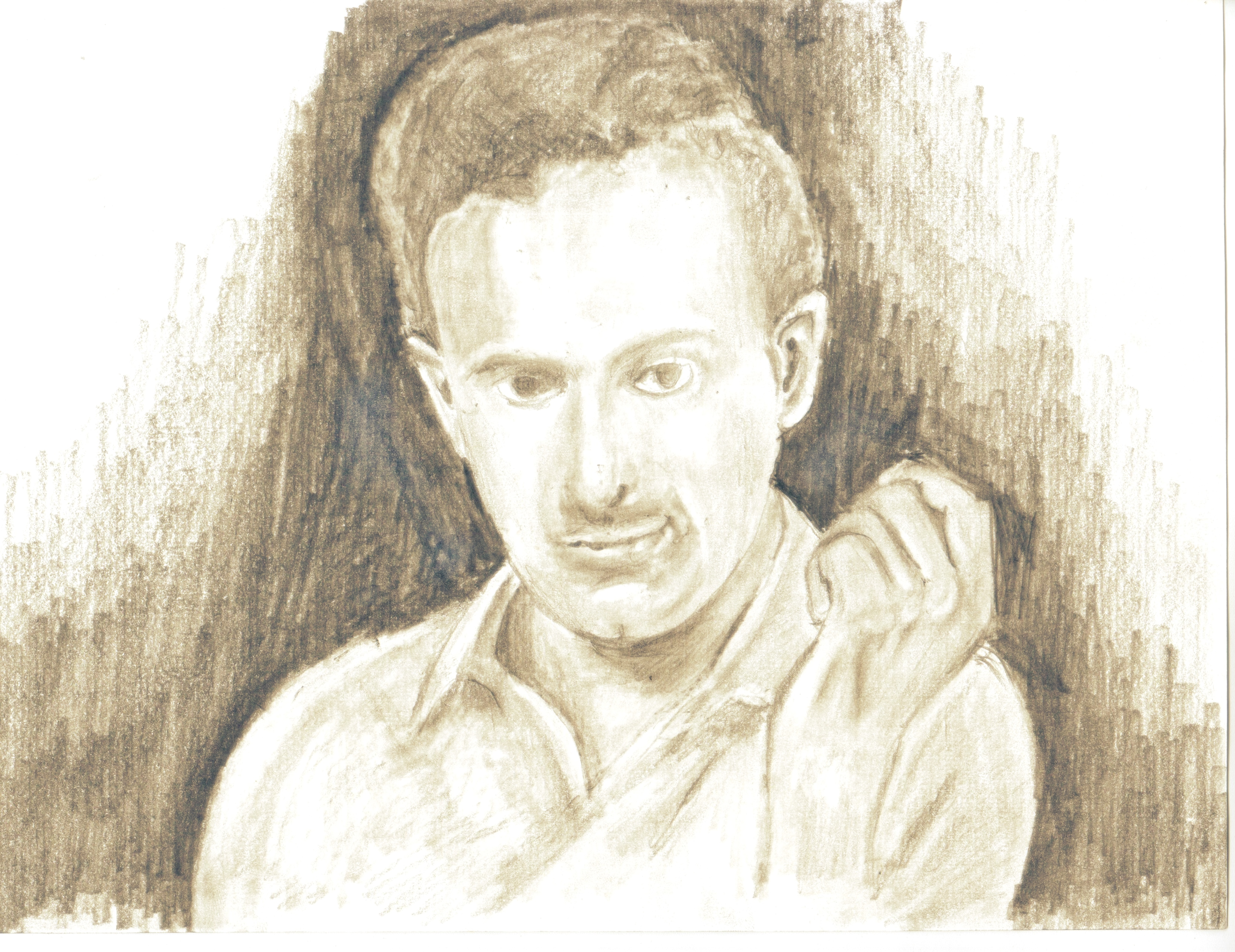
- Wickrama Bogoda
- Born: Bogoda Appuhamilage Don Wickrama Bogoda; June 16, 1940; Pannipitiya, Colombo
- Died: January 15, 2013 (aged 72); Pannipitiya, Colombo
- Education: Dharamapala Vidyalaya Pannipitiya
- Occupation: Actor
- Years active: 1960–1985
- Known for: Sugath in Golu Hadawatha

Bogoda Appuhamilage Don Wickrama Bogoda (Sinhala: බෝගොඩ අප්පුහාමිලාගේ දොන් වික්‍රම බෝගොඩ; June 16, 1940 – January 15, 2013), popularly known as Wickrama Bogoda, was an actor in Sri Lankan cinema and theater. Primarily known for his character acting in both stage plays and movies, he played a leading role in the movie Golu Hadawatha.

== Early life ==
He was born on June 16, 1940, to a middle-class family during the war years. His father worked in the Ceylon Electricity Board and his mother was a school teacher. In a family of three children, he was the eldest, with one brother and two sisters. Bogoda studied in the Dharmapala Vidyalaya, Pannipitiya. He never had any inclination to be an actor and did not have an atmosphere at home or influence for acting. During the school life, being a sports enthusiast, he was a member of the school's Army Cadet team. His father encouraged him to concentrate on studies and gain an opportunity for a respectable government job. As a result of his father's claim, after the Higher School Certificate (HSC) examination, Bogoda joined the Bank of Ceylon.

In the 1960s, when he was about to leave the school, the principal of his school directed him to play in a school drama. During that time, The Merchant of Venice was a popular stage-drama and used in literature and theater performance education. Bogoda played the character of Shylock. It became his first step for acting in a stage drama.

== Early career ==
During his employment in the Bank of Ceylon, he met the Sri Lankan playwright and novelist Sugathapala de Silva who led the drama group Apey Kattiya (Our Clan), a group of young artists known for adapting stage plays in the early 60s. Bogoda became a close associate of Sugathapala De Silva and members of the drama group. The group included notable people such as Tony Ranasinghe and Simon Navagattegama, were the most noted young theatre artists and peers of Bogoda in the early 60s. Their common meeting place was the Lion House restaurant and cafe in Bambalapitiya

Sugathapala de Silva wrote the stage-play Bodinkārayo (Boarders) which became a well-known stage-play in 60s. De Silva invited Bogoda to play a character in Bodinkārayo. One day, Sugathapala De Silva invited Lester James Peries to watch his stage-play. It was an unexpected opportunity for Bogoda, who at the time, was 21 years old. Dr Peries, noticing Bogoda's latent talent, decided to give him a leading role in his forthcoming film Gamperaliya (Transforming village) in 1963.

=== Role of Thissa in Gamperaliya ===
At the age of 21, Bogoda made his screen debut, under the direction of veteran film director Dr. Lester James Peiris, in the film Gamperaliya (Transforming Village). The film, is based on a novel, Gamperaliya written by veteran Sri Lankan novelist Martin Wickramasinghe in 1944 and later story followed by two versions as Kaliyugaya (Modern Era) and Yuganthya (End of an Era). Lester James Peiris directed these movies based on these three novels. Bogoda has the continuous opportunity to act in these 3 movies as the character, Thissa. Thissa is the youngest boy of a colonized and privileged family around which the stories are centralized. Thissa symbolizes the changes and subsequent adoption to the modern era who becomes radicalized and rejects the old colonized, traditional, and cultural practices. Gamperaliya gave Bogoda a warm debut, since the film was shown internationally and the novels were popular literature of Sri Lanka.

=== Role of Sugath in Golu Hadawatha ===
The movie Goluhadawatha gave Bogoda an opportunity to enter into the movie field. Golu Hadawatha (Silence of the Heart) was also based on a popular romantic novel about a relationship between teenage boy and a girl studying in the same class of their school. Karunasena Jayalath wrote this novel in 1962 based on his school life experiences. Lester James Peiris directed the novel into a motion-picture in 1967 from an original script by Piyasiri Gunaratne. Reggie Siriwardena also worked on the script.

== Character actor ==
Bogoda's first major breakthrough came from his acting in Golu Hadawatha as Sugath his performance in this movie showed an outstanding skill of improvisation. Golu Hadawatha conceptually influenced the romantic and love film genre in Sri Lanka in the 60s. Apart from its cinematic format and screen-presentation style, it heavily designed on the characterization and portrayal of the main two characters of Sugath and Dhammi, which were fictitious characters. According to broadly discussed cinema concepts, Bogoda's characterization of Sugath, tinged with traits explained in the Stanislavski's system to character acting; Bogoda had approached Sugath from his persona, with a deeper immersion of expressions than appearing as Sugath. He has intensively used his physical and psychological involvement to make the fictitious character come alive before an audience, who had read about the defeated lover, in the novel. The characterization of Sugath comprised a wider range of emotional expressions and characteristics throughout the movie to portray the personae of the defeated lover and how he reacted to his relationship with his girl friend. Simultaneously, he has used the acting styles defined in the Meisner Technique. In the point of Meisner Acting Technique, Bogoda has given a major support to the characterization of Dhammi (acted by veteran actress Anula Karunathilaka). In the relationship between Dhammi and Sugath, Dhammi is dominant and controller of the relationship, and Sugath is flexible/adaptable to her actions. According to Mesiner Technique of Acting, Bogoda demonstrated this adaptability throughout role of Sugath. Bogoda strongly characterized Sugath than acting as Sugath which made a popular Character of "true defeated lover" among movie buffs. In many of his later roles in the movies followed by Golu Hadawatha he chose to characterize roles.

Being a man with a calm and soft characteristic in real life, Bogoda maintained his own interpretation and judgments over his acting career. As his contemporaries in the cinema and journalism reveal, Bogoda did not like to act every character, on the basis of acting. He did not like to accept all the offers that not matching his instinctual impetus. He judiciously selected his characters based on the story and type of character assigned to him and he preferred neutral but influencing roles—the role that has a crucial impact on the story of the movie rather than the character itself. Over 20 years long career in Cinema and Theatre (1960-1985), he contributed over 20 stage-plays and over 15 movies. The hallmark of his acting was the character of Sugath in Golu Hadawatha. His acting career ended in 1985 after Kaliyugaya (Modern era), the 3rd episode of the Gamperaliya (Transforming village) saga. By this time the cinema and theatre has notably declined in Sri Lanka and Bogoda was one of the early retired actors. His last public appearance was in a Tele-drama series as a senior adult.

== Personal life and death ==
Following his retirement from the Bank of Ceylon and his acting career, he lived a personal life, while attending his personal business. Bogoda maintained a notable space between his acting career, personal and family life. As his contemporaries mentioned, he never sought gratuitous publicity for his acting life. He had his own set of hobbies; Bogoda was a good-reader and was fond of literature of varying genres. Being an environmental enthusiast, he neatly maintained his home-garden and engaged in the fruits of cultivation. He is a self-contained man who had his own business to take care of and was never dependent on cinema. In the final years of his life, Bogoda had been suffering from liver disease. Bogoda died on 15 January 2013 at his home. Upon his last-will, his remains were handed over to the Sri Lanka Medical Colleges, for educational purposes.

== Legacy and popular culture ==
Golu Hadawatha, both the novel and movie became a romantic and love icon among the young generation in the late 60s in Sri Lanka. Characters of Sugath and Dhammi turned to Archetype examples for a sacrificed love. Bogoda was one of the most popular actors in the late 1960s; especially his contribution (as Sugath) to Golu Hadawatha earned him that popularity and he became popular as Sugath. He earned respect among professional cinema artists for his memorable performances and charismatic screen presence. That gave an accurate characterization to Sugath that was a complex fictitious character in the novel. In the popular-cinema culture during the late 60s, the then young generation acclaimed Sugath as a role-model of a true lover. He received the sympathy of both men and women for being “booted” by his girlfriend Dhammi (“Boot” is a word used in the 60s to describe betrayal or refusal by either member of a couple).

Sugath and Dhammi belong to a tradition of tragic romance and love broadening back to the past in the memories of the movie buffs in Sri Lanka in the early 60s. Their story is viewed in the context of romance, love, and attachment which ended in pathos. In the late 60s, the story touched with the Rama-Seetha, Jaliya-Krishna, or Romeo-Juliet in the popular aesthetic and romance culture in the 60s and argument is based on the fact that Dhammi betrayed Sugath, while the idea stands though they were apart from each other, their love and attachment are permanent. Young men followed his characteristics fanatically and introduced them as “Sugath-type of lovers”. Over the years, the story of Sugath and Dhammi of Golu Hadwatha is broadly discussed in popular romance and love in the different genre of Literature, Music, Tele Drama, and Cinema. Today, the Golu Hadawatha has emerged with a new fame based on the social media networking—particularly on Facebook, personal or media blogs and YouTube. In popular culture today, Sugath's character is being analyzed as a weak character fallen before his girlfriend, yet he is a genuine lover. The new young generation views Dhammi and Sugath story as an attachment that should not have an end of that nature. Today, the novel Golu Hadawatha is not much known among the young generation, but the movie has a popular reception over the YouTube, the young generation who view the movie explains it as a romantic Sinhala movie for all seasons of the romance and love genre and acclaimed Wickrama Bogoda has performed as real Sugath who shows vulnerability and frustrated in his attachment to Dhammi. Many youths who use Facebook, use “Golu Hadawatha” as a popular slogan to express their feelings in different terms pertinent to their relationships, expressions of thoughts.

== Contribution to theatre and cinema 1960–1965 ==
=== Stage plays ===
- 1960 Vānisiya Welendā (Sinhala: වැනිසියේ වෙලෙන්දා) Merchant of the Venice
- 1961 Boarding Kārayo (Sinhala: බොඩින් කාරයෝ) Boarders
- 1963 Thattu Geval (Sinhala: තට්ටු ගෙවල්) Storied Houses
- 1964 Harima Badu Hayak (Sinhala: හරිම බඩු හයක්) 6 Stooges
- Akkara Paha (Sinhala: අක්කර පහ) Five Acres
- Kaní Pālama (Sinhala: කැළණි පාලම) Bridge Over Kaleni River
- Nattukakari (Sinhala: නැට්ටුක්කාරි) Dancing Girl (adaptation of Jean Anouilh's 'Colombe')
- Thuranga Sanniya (Sinhala: තුරඟ සන්නිය) Horse Race
- Ranthodu (Sinhala: රන් තෝඩු) Golden Ear Rings
- Onna Babo Athinniya (Sinhala: ඔන්න බබෝ ඇතින්නියා) Baby Watch out that's an elephant
- Thāthā (Sinhala: තාත්තා) Father
- Vahalak Nethi Geyak (Sinhala: වහලක් නැති ගෙයක්) A house Without a Roof

== Filmography ==
Year	Film	Role	Ref.
1963	Gamperaliya	Tissa	
1965	Adarayay Karunawai		
1966	Kinkini Paada		
1966	Delovak Athara	Sarath	
1968	Golu Hadawatha	Sugath Weerasekera	
1969	Binaramalee	Sinno	
1971	Kalana Mithuro		
1971	Samanala Kumariyo		
1973	Hathdinnath Tharu	Siripala	
1974	Ahas Gauwa	Bandu	
1979	Palagetiyo		
1981	Ran Ethana		
1983	Kaliyugaya	Tissa	
1985	Yuganthaya	Tissa	

== Sources ==
1. Amarasena, Arthur U (2013). අපේ කට්ටිය අත්හැර වෙන්ව ගිය බෝගොඩ. http://www.sarasaviya.lk/2013/01/24/?fn=sa1301247
2. Devapriaya, Uditha (2017). Getting (into) Sinhala Movies. http://mirrorcitizen.dailymirror.lk/2017/07/27/getting-into-sinhala-movies/
3. Silva, Promod (2017). Taking Lankan Movies to the world. http://archives1.sundayobserver.lk/2017/06/25/columns/taking-lankan-movies-world
4. Nandana, Mālaka (2013). සුගත්ගේ වියෝව මට දරාගන්න බැරි වුනා.http://www.gossiplankahotnews.com/2013/01/blog-post_5822.html
5. Senevirathne, SSA (2017).The Paradigm Shift of Sri Lankan Cinema. http://www.ajbssit.net.au/index.php/AJBSSIT/article/viewFile/54/45
