= Wat Matchimawat, Udon Thani =

Buddhist temple in Udon Thani, Thailand

Wat Matchimawat
- วัดมัชฌิมาวาส
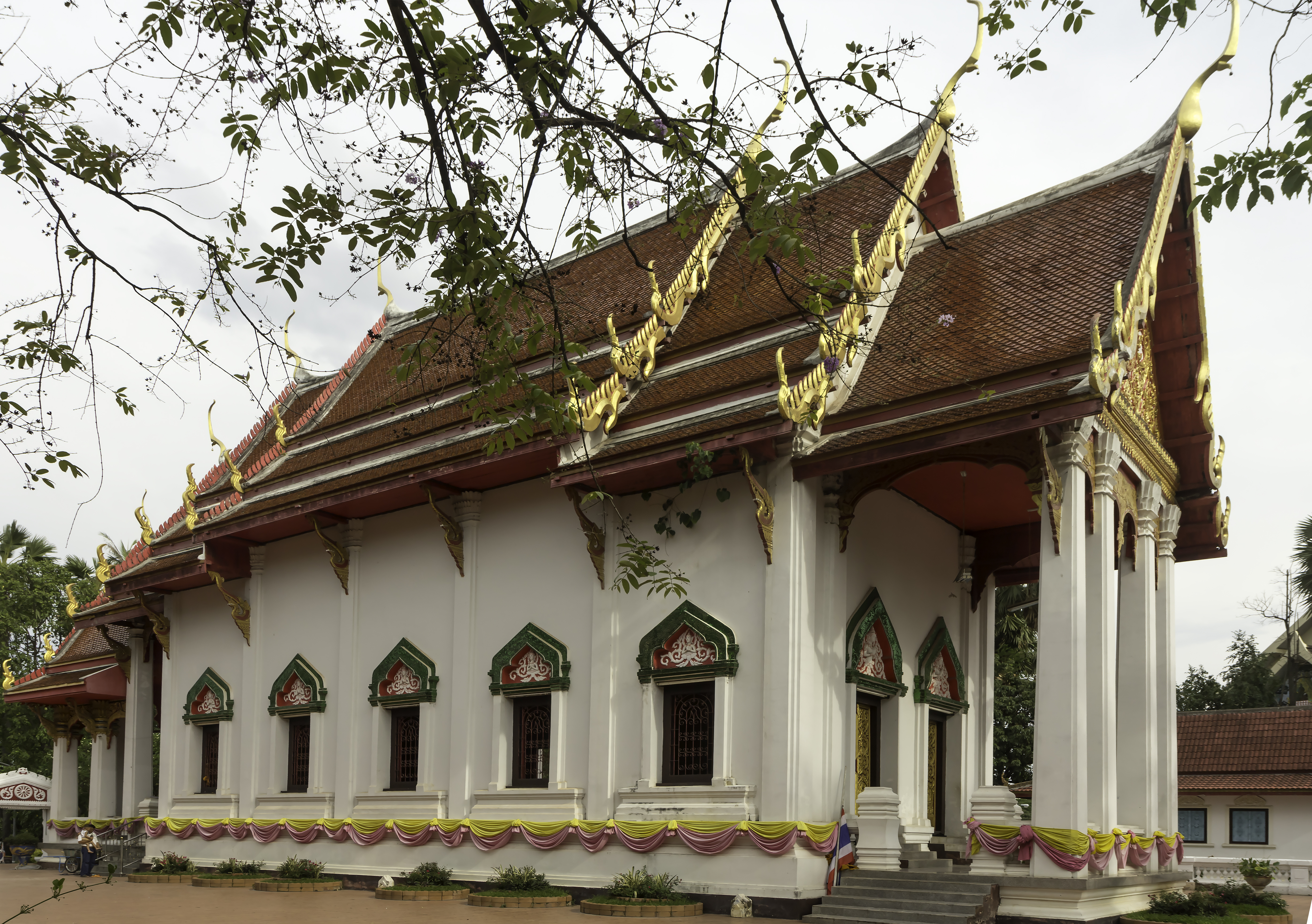
- The ordination hall

Religion
- Affiliation: Buddhism
- Sect: Theravāda Mahā Nikāya
- Status: Third class royal temple

Location
- Location: Watthananuwong rd, Mak Khaeng, Udon Thani, Udon Thani province.
- Country: Thailand
- Interactive map of Wat Matchimawat
- Coordinates: 17.414928°N 102.789822°E

Architecture
- Founder: Unknown

Wat Matchimawat (Thai: วัดมัชฌิมาวาส), formerly and still colloquially known as Wat Non Mak Khaeng (วัดโนนหมากแข้ง) is an ancient Buddhist temple in Udon Thani province, Thailand. Regarded as the temple of Udon Thani.

Originally, the temple and the Buddha image were abandoned, until Prince Prachaksinlapakhom, founder of Udon Thani, planted the city of Udon Thani in the area of the temple.

The prince named the temple as Wat Matchimawat after rehabilitated the temple. The name Matchimawat means "the middle temple", owing he wanted others to think that this temple is the centre of the city. His intention was to encourage others that the temple belonged to everybody so they should take good care of public belonging.

On May 7, 1964, the temple was designated as third class royal monastery.

Luang Pho Nak (หลวงพ่อนาค) is a principle Buddha image and is also considered the Buddha image of Udon Thani province as well.

In 1951, Phrathep Wisutthachan, the former abbot, rehabilitated the ordination hall and the Buddha image after finding them abandoned. He decided to build a new Buddha image to cover the original image and invited him to enshrine in front of the ordination hall. Since then, people like to come here to worship this Buddha image.

The original Luang Pho Nak is 2 ft (61.0 cm) tall made of white stone. The size is not very big so it could be stolen easily, so the abbot decided to build a plaster Buddha image to cover the original one.
