= Film Heritage Foundation =

Indian non-profit organization

- Founded: 2014
- Founder: Shivendra Singh Dungarpur
- Type: Non-profit organization
- Location: Mumbai, India
- Website: filmheritagefoundation.co.in

Film Heritage Foundation is a non-profit organization dedicated to film preservation, restoration and archiving of India’s film heritage. It is based in Mumbai, India.

== History ==
The Film Heritage Foundation was founded in 2014 by Shivendra Singh Dungarpur.

The foundation’s activities include conservation and archiving of films and film-related memorabilia, film restoration, training and education, film curation, public outreach, and advocacy. It also runs education and training programmes and holds workshops on film conservation and preservation and restoration around India.

In April 2015, it was accepted as an associate member of the International Federation of Film Archives (FIAF). Dungarpur has been elected four times as a member of the Executive Committee of FIAF. The same year, it raised funds for their film preservation and restoration workshop as well as from private businesses and Bollywood actors.

Martin Scorsese’s The Film Foundation lent their support for Film Heritage Foundation’s first film preservation and restoration workshop in Mumbai. In 2017, Tata Trusts supported the foundation with a three-year grant in 2017 to provide scholarships for participants at their annual film preservation and restoration workshops.

In 2018, the foundation initiated an oral history project, in which it interviewed eminent film personalities such as Adoor Gopalakrishnan, Buddhadeb Dasgupta, Mani Ratnam, Amitabh Bachchan, Soumitra Chatterjee, Goutam Ghose and Aparna Sen. In 2019, it received the memorabilia of the Indian actor Raj Kapoor for preservation.

On June 14, 2024, India Post released a postal Special Cover and cancellation stamp in celebration of the foundation's work in preserving and restoring India's cinematic legacy over a decade. Renowned filmmaker Shyam Benegal, lyricist Gulzar, and the chief postmaster generals of Maharashtra and Mumbai presided over the event.

It has partnered with the Academy of Motion Picture Arts and Sciences (AMPAS) for an oral history program covering film heritage in India.

== Preservation and archiving ==
Film collection

The foundation currently has around 500 titles (approx. 7500 film reels) on 35 mm, 16 mm, Super 8 and 8 mm formats from the earliest days of cinema and from all regions. Besides feature films, the collections include important historical footage dating from the 1930s and ‘40s, including footage of the freedom movement and rare home movies of the pre-Independence era that are preserved in a temperature-controlled storage facility.

Archive of film-related memorabilia

The foundation also archives film-related memorabilia like posters, photographs, scripts, lobby cards, song booklets and artefacts of eminent film personalities.

== Films restored ==
Following are select films restored by the foundation:

- Kummatty
- Thampu
- Ishanou
- Manthan
- Ghatashraddha
- Maya Miriga
- Sholay
- Gehenu Lamai
- Aranyer din Ratri
- Do Bigha Zamin
- In Which Annie Gives It Those Ones
- Amma Ariyan

=== Gehenu Lamai ===
Film Heritage Foundation restored Sumitra Peries’ lyrical Sri Lankan film “Gehenu Lamai” (Girls, 1978) in association with the Lester James Peries and Sumitra Peries Foundation restored under the aegis of FISCH: France- India – Sri Lanka Cine Heritage – Saving Film Across Borders – an international collaboration between FHF, French Embassy in India / Ambassade de France en Inde the Ambassade de France à Sri Lanka et aux Maldives;

The restored version of Sumitra Peries' 1978 film 'Gehenu Lamai' premiered at the Festival de Cannes, a result of the Film Heritage Foundation’s restoration work. The event was proud and emotional. Attendees included lead actress Wasanthi Chathurani, actor Ajith Jinadasa, actress Shyama Ananda, Film Heritage Foundation director Shivendra Singh Dungarpur and Gerald Duchaussoy, head of Cannes Classics. The audience also had representatives from Sri Lankan film and cultural organisations well as Mathieu Bejot of the French Institute, in India.

=== ARANYER DIN RATRI ===
The Film Foundation’s World Cinema Project in collaboration with Film Heritage Foundation, Janus Films, and the Criterion Collection restored Satyajit Ray’s film “Aranyer Din Ratri” (1970). The restored film premiered at the Cannes Film Festival 2025.

A constellation of stars walked the red carpet at Cannes on May 19, 2025 for the premiere of the restored “Aranyer Din Ratri” including acclaimed filmmaker Wes Anderson, actresses Sharmila Tagore and Simi Garewal along with FHF Director Shivendra Singh Dungarpur, Margaret Bodde of The Film Foundation’s World Cinema Project, Peter Becker and Fumiko Takagi of The Criterion Collection / Janus Films and Agni Dutta and Piyali Roy from the producer’s family. The screening of the film was introduced by Wes Anderson, Sharmila Tagore, Simi Garewal and FHF Director Shivendra Singh Dungarpur.

=== Do Bigha Zamin ===
Bimal Roy’s film “Do Bigha Zamin” was restored by The Criterion Collection and Janus Films in collaboration with Film Heritage Foundation. The world premiere of Bimal Roy’s restored “Do Bigha Zamin” (1953) took place at the Venice Film Festival on September 4, 2025 with 21 members of the Bimal Roy family - three generations ranging from the ages of 83 to 8 - helmed by the three children of the renowned filmmaker - Rinki Roy Bhattacharya, Aparajita Roy Sinha and Joy Bimal Roy who travelled from all over the world to attend the premiere of the film. The film was presented along with the Venice Film Festival Director Alberto Barbera and Oscar-winning filmmaker and President of the International Jury of the festival Alexander Payne with FHF Director Shivendra Singh Dungarpur and the restoration team from L’Immagine Ritrovata, Bologna attended the screening at the Sala Corinto.

=== In Which Annie Gives It Those Ones ===
FHF completed the restoration work of the film In Which Annie Gives It Those Ones in January 2026. The film was played at 76th Berlin International Film Festival. The restored work was released in cinemas across India on March 13, 2026.

=== Amma Ariyan ===
Film Heritage Foundation returns to the Cannes Film Festival for the fifth consecutive year with the 4K restoration of John Abraham’s ‘Amma Ariyan’. The Malayalam film is the only Indian feature film to be selected this year for a world premiere at the festival marking a momentous moment for the Indian film and entertainment industry.

== Film programming and film festivals ==
=== Bachchan Back to the Beginning Film Festival ===
In 2022, 11 Amitabh Bachchan films were screened as part of the "Bachchan Back to the Beginning" festival in 17 Indian cities.

In 2023, four of these films were shown at the 70th Sydney Film Festival. Subsequently, the foundation co-presented nine films at the 45th edition of the Festival des 3 Continents in Nantes, France.

=== Dilip Kumar - Hero of Heroes Film Festival ===
In 2022, in honour of Dilip Kumar's birth centennial, Film Heritage Foundation and PVR Cinemas collaborated to screen 4 of the actor's iconic movies: Aan, Devdas, Ram Aur Shyam, and Shakti.

=== An Indian Autumn at the Festival des 3 Continents in France ===
Film Heritage Foundation partnered with Festival des 3 Continents to co-present a retrospective of 14 classics of Indian Cinema at the 44th edition of the festival.

=== Dev Anand @ 100 - Forever Young Film Festival ===
To mark Dev Anand's 100th birthday on September 26, 2023, Film Heritage Foundation and National Film Archive of India, in collaboration with PVR INOX, presented "Dev Anand@100 - Forever Young" - a weekend festival of four Dev Anand milestone films in cinemas in 30 cities.

=== Cinema Italian Style – Celebrating Tornatore and the Masters of Italian Cinema ===
‘Cinema Italian Style – Celebrating Tornatore and the Masters of Italian Cinema,’ a film festival showcasing restored Italian classics was organised in 2024. Giuseppe Tornatore, Oscar-winning director of Cinema Paradiso (1988) visited Mumbai as part of the festival.

=== Raj Kapoor 100 – Celebrating a Century of the Greatest Showman ===
In 2024, “Raj Kapoor 100 – Celebrating the Centenary of the Greatest Showman,” a special festival was hosted where ten Raj Kapoor films were screened in 40 cities across India.

=== Wim Wenders – King of the Road – The India Tour ===
Film Heritage Foundation, in association with the Wim Wenders Stiftung and in collaboration with Goethe-Institut/Max Mueller Bhavan Mumbai presented “Wim Wenders – King of the Road – The India Tour” – a 25 day travelling retrospective across India from Feb 5 – 23, 2025 that showcased 18 Wim Wenders’ films. The screenings were free and open to the public. On his first trip to India, Wim Wenders presented screenings in each city, engaging with audiences in masterclasses and a conversation with prominent members of the Indian film fraternity.

=== Raj Khosla 100 – Bambai Ka Babu ===
FHF organised “Raj Khosla 100 – Bambai Ka Babu" event on May 31, 2025 on the occasion of birth centenary of renowned filmmaker Raj Khosla. It included screenings of his films “CID (1956)", “Bambai Ka Babu (1960)" and “Mera Gaon Mera Desh (1971)" and a panel discussion that included iconic actress Asha Parekh who starred in several of his films, Khosla’s mentee and director Mahesh Bhatt, his daughter Anita Khosla and author Amborish Roychoudhury.

== Training programmes ==
The foundation has been conducting film preservation and restoration workshops in collaboration with the International Federation of Film Archives (FIAF) in India since 2015. It held the first in the series of short workshops with David Walsh and Mick Newnham in March, 2018.

In 2018, it organized an event headlined by visual artist Tacita Dean and film director Christopher Nolan in Mumbai.

In March 2019, it conducted a workshop in Kathmandu to save Nepal’s audiovisual heritage with FIAF and the Nepal Film Development Board.

In 2020, it collaborated with the Goethe-Institut at Max Mueller Bhavan Mumbai to conduct a 2-day Workshop for the Preservation of Audio and Videotapes. Andreas Weisser, a conservation expert from Germany was invited to conduct sessions on how to preserve audio and video tapes.

=== FPRWI ===
Film Heritage Foundation and FIAF regularly conduct the Film Preservation & Restoration Workshop India (FPRWI).

As of 2025, the annual workshops have now travelled to Mumbai, Pune, Chennai, Kolkata, Hyderabad, Delhi, Thiruvananthapuram and Bhubaneswar.

=== Biennial Audio-Visual Archival Summer School (BAVASS) 2023 ===
In October 2023, the International Federation of Film Archives and the foundation held the Biennial Audio-Visual Archival Summer School. BAVASS 2023 hosted participants from several countries including 13 African countries, Greece, Germany, Belgium, Finland, Mexico, Thailand, and Vietnam.

=== Film Archive in Manipur ===
On April 10, 2021, Film Heritage Foundation entered into a Memorandum of Understanding (MOU) with the Manipur State Film Development Society (MSFDS) to collaborate with them and advise them on setting up the Manipur State Film Archive and Museum. The foundation donated the first two rewinding tables to the new archive, which were transported by road in a journey that took 21 days from Mumbai to Imphal.

== Lifetime Achievement Award ==
Film Heritage Foundation instituted a Lifetime Achievement Award for Cinema Projection in 2023. The recipients of the inaugural FHF Lifetime Achievement Award were Mohammed Aslam Fakih from Regal Cinema Mumbai; Lakhan Lal Yadav from Amardeep Cinema and Raj Talkies, Raipur; and P. A. Salam from the National Film Archive of India, Pune. The award included a certificate and prize money for each recipient.
