= Karunathilaka =

Karunathilaka is a surname. Notable people with the surname include:

- Anula Karunathilaka (born 1946), Sri Lankan actress
- Gayantha Karunatileka (born 1962), Sri Lankan politician
