= St. Paul's Balika Maha Vidyalaya, Kelaniya =

ST.PAUL'S BALIKA MAHA VIDYALAYA

Location
- Waragoda; Kelaniya, Sri Lanka, Western Province; Sri Lanka

Information
- Motto: Facienthes Veritatem Et Caritate (Called to Duty in Truth and Love)
- Religious affiliation(s): Roman Catholic
- Established: 1935
- Founder: Rev. Fe. Moris J. Le Goc (Missionary Oblates of Mary Immaculate)
- School district: Gampaha
- Principal: Rev. Sr. Maria Rianna (Apostolic Carmel Congregation)
- Grades: 1 to 13 Local Syllabus
- Gender: Girls
- Language: Sinhala
- Color(s): Green and Gold

St. Paul's Balika Maha Vidyalaya is a Roman Catholic school for girls in Kelaniya, Sri Lanka.
