= Wassanaye Sanda =

- promotional poster
- Sinhala: වස්සානයේ සඳ
- Directed by: Udayakantha Warnasuriya
- Written by: Udayakantha Warnasuriya
- Produced by: Nilwala Films
- Starring: Oshadi Himasha; Piumi Hansamali; Anuj Ranasinghe; Angelo Sanjeev Barnes
- Cinematography: Ayeshmantha Hettiarachchi
- Edited by: Pravin Jayaratne
- Music by: Rohana Weerasinghe
- Release date: 25 May 2018
- Country: Sri Lanka
- Language: Sinhala

Wassanaye Sanda (Sinhala: වස්සානයේ සඳ, lit. 'Moon of the Autumn') is a 2018 Sri Lankan Sinhala romantic drama film directed by Udayakantha Warnasuriya and co-produced by the director along with Mahesh K. Bandara and H. D. Premasiri. It stars Oshadi Himasha, Piumi Hansamali and Angelo Sanjeev Barnes with Anuj Ranasinghe in lead roles along with Anula Karunathilaka and Ravindra Randeniya. The music was composed by veteran musician Rohana Weerasinghe.

A number of the scenes from the film were shot in Australia. The film had its international premiere on 8 October 2017 in Sydney, Australia, with a subsequent screening in Melbourne on 14 October.

The film was not released in Sri Lanka until 25 May 2018, with a simultaneous book launch of Wassanaye Sanda taking place when the film debuted at the Regal Cinema in Colombo. It is the 1305th (LK) Sri Lanka film in the Sinhala cinema.

== Cast ==
- Anuj Ranasinghe as Sandesh
- Piumi Hansamali as Mihiri
- Angelo Sanjeev Barnes as Gayantha
- Anula Karunathilaka as Mihiri's mother
- Ravindra Randeniya as Sandesh's father
- Srinath Maddumage as Thusith
- Suvineetha Weerasinghe as Sandesh's mother
- Oshadi Himasha as Nathasha
- Kirula Herath as Eranga
- Giwantha Arthasath as Weda mahaththaya
- Prasanna Priyadarshana as Sisira
- Kumari Senarathna as Menaka
- Gayathri Pananwala as Malathi
- Sarath Chandrasiri as Traffic police seargent

== Songs ==
The film contains five songs.

No.	Title	Lyrics	Singer(s)	Length
1.	"Asani Warsha"	Sunil Ariyaratne	Sunil Edirisinghe
2.	"Madhu Sandakan"	Sunil Wimalaweera	Abhisheka Wimalaweera, Amal Perera
3.	"Asirimath Wu Premaye"	Kularatne Ariyawansa	Uresha Ravihari, Dumal Warnakulasuriya
4.	"Adaraya Adahiya Noheka"	Bandara Eheliyagoda	Sashika Nisansala
5.	"Ahas Samudura"	Ariyasinghe Perera	Amarasiri Peiris
