= Sri Dharmaloka College =

Coordinates: 6°57′41.43″N 79°54′04.88″E

- Kelaniya; Sri Lanka

Information
- Type: Public
- Motto: "ALOKO UDHA PADHEE"
- Established: 1938
- Principal: Vipula Kulathunga
- Colors: Maroon and Yellow
- Affiliation: Buddhist
- Website: http://www.sridharmaloka.lk/

Sri Dharmaloka College is a national school in the Western province of Sri Lanka, situated near the Kelaniya Temple. The school was established in 1938 at the premises of Vidyalankara Pirivena. In the 1950s, the college moved to its current location on the Kelaniya premises.

== Motto ==
Dharmaloka's motto is "Aloko Uda Paadee," which means "The light has come," a lyric reputed to be mentioned by the greatest philosopher Lord Buddha after he had obtained enlightenment. In this same lyric, Buddha is said to have continued "The wise has attained."

== Crest ==
Dharmaloka's crest is a circle which contains a symbol of an oil lamp, the school motto, and lotus petals. The lotus petals symbolize glory and success. The oil lamp symbolizes light, wisdom and glory. The motto is in the middle circle of the crest.

== Flag ==
Dharmaloka's flag was designed many years after the school opened. It has three columns; the middle column is yellow and the side columns are maroon. In the middle column there is the school's crest. It symbolizes the school's glory and loyalty to Dharmaloka.

== History ==
Sri Dharmaloka college was a Buddhist English school established in Peliyagoda in 1938 under the patronage of Vidyalankara Pirivena. It was named after Ratmalane Sri Dharmaloka Thera, who was the founder of the Vidyalankara Pirivena.

Rev. Yakkaduwe Pannarama was a scholar priest who became the head of the pirivena and later the Vice Chancellor of Kelaniya University. When Rev. Pannarama and several other priests walked along Waragoda Road from the Pirivena in Peliyagoda to Bodhirukkharamaya in Waragoda, some Catholics of St. Paul's Convent and Girls' School were in the habit of shouting "thattayo," "sivuruhoro" and other words to humiliate them. Rev. Pannarama brought this to the notice of Sir D. B. Jayatilaka, President of the Dayaka Sabhawa, and he suggested that the pirivena must start a Buddhist school near the Catholic area as it is only through education that such persons may be corrected. So Jayatilaka and Rev Yakkaduwe founded the school. They also discussed at the Sabha meeting that even Christian children would join the school later and that education is the only way to combat ignorance.

Sri Dharmaloka college was opened in 1938 in a small building on land adjoining Vidyalankara Pirivena, and Mr. B. A. Kuruppu became its first headmaster. Sir D. B. Jayathilaka inaugurated the educational activities of the school by taking the first lessons of the first students. In 1940, Dharmaloka ushered in an era of rapid development. D. B. Dhanapala, the famous journalist, became principal of the school. At the beginning, this school possessed neither a playground nor sufficient space to set up even a volleyball court. The school building was surrounded by marsh. The road leading to the pirivena was used as a sports ground. The school gained in popularity and the following year, parents of Kelaniya rushed to get their children admitted. The size of the school building did not permit him to admit all the children who sought admission. He organized a fundraising carnival which enabled him to put up a two-storey building which could accommodate more children. The school was moved to Yasmin Walawwa premises.

The greatness of Dhanapala lay not only in his ability to teach and guide the students in educational matters, but also in his qualities as a great disciplinarian through which he imparted high moral ideals both to his students and teaching staff. During this period there were teachers of outstanding abilities such as C. M. Weeraratne, later Vice Principal of Ananda College and mathematics instructor at the University of Colombo, A. P. Jinadasa, H. L. Rathnapala, U.G.P. de Mel and Brakenridge whose impressive teaching methods influenced former Dharmaloka students who are now doctors, engineers, lawyers and more.

In 1946, Dhanapala left the school due to differences of opinion with the board of governors; most of the staff resigned with him. The school was handed over to the government and the venue shifted to the present site. Mr. H. M. Gunasekara took over the reins of the school as the principal.

== List of school principals ==
From	To	Principal's Name
1938	1941	Mr. B.A. Kuruppu
1947	1954	Mr. H. M. Gu
1955	1956	Mr. D. A. Weerasinghe
1956	1957	Mr. G. T. Fonseka
1957	1960	Mr. A. C. B. M. Monaragala
1961	1962	Mr. G. V. Bannahaka
1962	1963	Mr. B. D. M. Gunarathna
1964	1967	Mr. K. D. P. C. N. Vijegunarathna
1968	1969	Mr. P. R. Premaeardhane
1970	1972	Mr. Sugathamuny Ghanasiri
1972	1973	Mr. D. T. Thewarapperuma
1973	1973	Mr. L. V. V. Jayasinghe
1973	1982	Ven. Honorable Athtuduwave Chandrasiri Thero
1983	1984	Ven. Honorable Mawanane Dhewanandha Thero
1984	1989	Mr. D. G. W. Jayasinghe
1989	1991	Ven. Honorable Brahmanawatthe Seewalee Thero
1992	1995	Mr. Piyasena Athapatthu
1995	1996	Mr. J. A. Karunarathne
1996	1997	Mrs. H. Godawattha
1997	1997	Mr. T. SA. S. G. Jayawardene
1997	2002	Mr. G. Gunathilake
2002	2004	Mr. T. S. Thanapathi
2004	2022	Mr. Nimal Jayaweera
2022	2024	Mrs. Dinithi Amarasinghe
2024		Mr. Vipula Kulathunga

== Notable alumni ==
- Sathischandra Edirisinghe – actor in Sri Lankan cinema
- Wilson Gunaratne – actor in Sri Lankan cinema
- Sunil Edirisinghe – Sri Lankan classical musician
- Chathurangi Jayasooriya - Sri Lankan National Netball Team captain since 2017 - joined team 2011
