= Sathischandra Edirisinghe =

Sri Lankan actor, dramatist and director (1941–2025)

- සතිස්චන්ද්‍ර එදිරිසිංහ
- Born: Patikirige Sathischandra Edirisinghe; 11 February 1941; Kelaniya, British Ceylon
- Died: 23 December 2025 (aged 84); Colombo, Sri Lanka
- Education: Sri Dharmaloka College; St. Mary's College; Vidyodaya Pirivena, Maligakanda
- Occupations: Actor; producer; director; writer; author
- Years active: 1961–2025
- Spouse: Shriya Kariyapperuma (m. 1965)
- Children: 3
- Parents: Patikirige Edirisinghe (father); Elizabeth Perera (mother)
- Relatives: Sunil Edirisinghe (brother)
- Awards: Best Supporting Actor
- Website: www.youtube.com/sathischandra

Kalasuri Patikirige Sathischandra Edirisinghe (Sinhala: සතිස්චන්ද්‍ර එදිරිසිංහ; 11 February 1941 – 23 December 2025) was a Sri Lankan actor in film, stage drama and television. Edirisinghe was an actor and director whose professional career in Sri Lankan cinema, theatre, and television spanned more than six decades.

== Background ==
Sathischandra Edirisinghe was born in Kelaniya on 11 February 1941 as the sixth child of the family. His father, Patikirige Edirisinghe, served as a chief supervisor in the Department of Cottage Industries, and his mother, Ushettige Elizabeth Perera, was a housewife. He had one elder brother, Dharmasiri; four elder sisters, Techla Sandaseelee, Florida Katherine, Mershia Sirima, and Mary Elizabeth; and two younger brothers, Nimal Ranjith and Sunil. His younger brother, Sunil Edirisinghe, is a singer in the Sri Lankan music industry.

Edirisinghe completed his education at five schools. He started his preschool career with Sir D. B. Jayatilaka Vidyalaya, then entered Sri Dharmaloka College, Kelaniya, in 1947. After ten years at the school, Edirisinghe then moved to St. Mary's College, Elpitiya, in 1958 to complete A/L from art stream. In 1960, he entered Stafford College, and in 1964, he completed his secondary education at Vidyodaya Pirivena, Maligakanda.

In 1965, he married Kariyapperuma Arachchige Sriya Kariyapperuma. Sriya was born on 7 November 1941. She met Sathischandra Edirisinghe at Sri Dharmaloka College, Kelaniya. They had three children, Udaya, Shashini, and Udara.

The elder son, Udaya Shashipriya, studied at S. Thomas' College, Gurutalawa. He currently handles his own business, U and I Ceylon (Pvt) Ltd. The middle child and daughter, Shashini, studied at St. Paul's Balika Maha Vidyalaya, Kelaniya. She is a B.Com graduate and currently resides in Australia. The youngest child, Udara Asanga, studied at Royal College, Colombo. He is interested in textile and fashion designing in Australia. All are married.

Edirisinghe died on 23 December 2025 at age 84 while receiving treatment at a private hospital in Thalawathugoda, Colombo. His remains were laid to rest for public rites at his residence on 24 December. The final rites were scheduled to take place at Kanatte Cemetery.

== Theatre work ==
Edirisinghe's first teacher at Sri Dharmaloka Central College was Ravilal Wimaladharma, who had a keen interest in literature and music. At grade 5, he tried to act as Madduma Bandara at home, a drama from his literature book. After Wimaladharma saw his capabilities, Edirisinghe was put in charge of the stage play Sudo Sudu in the school. In 1953, he joined Lamapitiya program in Radio Ceylon. For his role in Anton Chekhov’s Proposal at the inter-school drama competition, Edirisinghe was adjudged the Best Actor of the Southern Province.

In 1961, Edirisinghe started his stage drama career when his elder brother, Dharmasiri Edirisinghe, introduced him to Kala Guru J. D. A. Perera. In 1999, after the service in CTB and Mahaweli Authority, he became a full-time artist. His peak as a theatre actor came through his role in John de Silva's stage play Wessanthara. With wider recognition, he was able to cooperate with the country's leading scriptwriters, such as Gunasena Galappathi, Dayananda Gunawardane, Henry Jayasena, Sugathapala de Silva, R.R. Samarakoon, Sunanda Mahendra, Ranjit Dharmakeerthi, S. Karunaratne, Lucien Bulathsinghala, and Dhamma Jagoda. His memorable theater acting came through Henry Jayasena's Manaranjana Vedavarjana in 1965.

=== Notable works ===
- Baka Thapas
- Vessanthara
- Sri Wicrama
- Ibi Katta
- Manaranja Wedewarjana
- Liyathabara
- Maha Hene Hiriyaka
- Maha Gedere
- Cheri Uyana (Cherry Orchard)
- Onna Babo Ethiniya
- Habun Katai Bath Dekatai
- Elade
- Erabodu Mal Pottu Pipila
- Geheniyak
- Sauren Ae Lada
- Ane Massine
- Ruduraya Saha Gangawa
- Liya Thambara

== Television acting ==
Edirisinghe's first television role was Lucien Bulathsinhala's Ekamawakage Daruwo in 1982. In the drama, he played the main role, a school principal. He played in many popular films during the early stage of Sri Lankan television, such as Mihikathage Daruwo, Tharadevi, and Palingu Menike.

=== Notable works - as actor ===
- Ambu Daruwo
- Aravinda saha Indu
- Avindu Adura
- Chandi Kumarihami
- Eke Mawakege Daruwo
- Gauwen Gauwa
- Kadathira
- Kokila Ginna
- Mihikathege Daruwo
- Minigandela
- Nisala Vilthera
- Paligu Menike
- Sausiri Uyana
- Senehelatha Menike
- Sivmansala
- Sonduru SIthaththi
- Sudu Hamine
- Sudu Mahaththuru
- Sudu Paraviyo
- Sujatha
- Sura-asura
- Suseema
- Thara Devi
- Uthuru Sulanga
- Uthuwankande Sura Saradiyel
- Wassanaye Hiru Evidin

=== Notable works - both as producer and actor ===
- Tikiri Nileme
- Namal Golla
- Bopath Sakkiya
- Girikula Andereya
- Suwanda Padma
- Diyawadana Maluwa
- Monaravila
- Sathmahala

== Stage and film directing ==
In 1963, Edirisinghe started his first direction and production of stage dramas with the play Baka Thapas. Out of 20 stage plays he acted in, six of them were his production and direction. In 1964 he produced a second stage play, Atthikka Mal Pipila, with his own script. He produced another four stage dramas—Hotabari Yuddae, based on George Orwell's Animal Farm, Thahanchi, Sokkano Rajano and Apaya Avurudu.

Edirisinghe began directing films in 1973. His first cinematic direction came through Matara Aachchi in 1973. The film featured his brother Sunil Edirisinghe as a singer, Wally Nanayakkara as lyricist, and Victor Ratnayake as music director.

Edirisinghe has produced eleven television serials, of which he directed seven. In 2019, he was honored with the Janabhimani Honorary Award at the Bandaranaike Memorial International Conference Hall.

== Beyond acting ==
In 1965, Edirisinghe was attached to Ceylon Transport of Bus (CTB) as a clerk. After the marriage and a few years of work, he resigned from CTB and joined Mahaweli Authority in 1986. In the authority, he served as the Manager in Cultural Affairs from 1986 to 1998.

In 2008, Edirisinghe was invited to take the position of Consultant in Cultural Affairs in the Ministry of Irrigation.

Edirisinghe was an author with several published works, such as Apa Sathu Minimuthu, Kata Wata Kara Weta, and Jalaya Saha Minisa. He wrote nearly 25 books, eight of which were children's literature. He went with a scriptwriter to Kuwait in 1990 for a stage drama. During that period, Sadaam Hussein captured control of Kuwait, and the crew was stuck there for 47 days in the Middle East, after which they returned to Sri Lanka. A felicitation ceremony titled Sathischandra Edirisinghe in Retrospect was held on January 16, 2011, at 6pm at Kularatne Hall in Ananda College Maradana, which was organized by Telemakers Guild.

During a family trip to Ella, Badulla, in January 2019, gold jewellery and cash worth nearly Rs.189,000 were stolen from the family. Police said that the thief might have entered the room through a window, as one of the windows was opened.

=== Author works ===
- Apa Sathu Minimuthu
- Kata Wata Kara Weta
- Jalaya Saha Minisa
- Adaraya Saha Vivahaya
- Ape Thaththa
- Guru Bhumika Nirupanaya
- Raththaran Daruwek
- Thanhawa Dukata Hethu We
- Wanduru Nuwana

== Legacy ==
On January 14, 2008, a felicitation programme titled Sathischandra Prathibhanaya was held at 3 pm at Sarasavi Studio, Dalugama, Kelaniya. The programme was organized by the Nuwana Youth Organisation.

He was awarded the Kala Suri title in 1990 by President Ranasinghe Premadasa and conferred with an honorary degree from the University of Kelaniya in 2006.

== Awards ==
=== Presidential Awards ===
Year	Nominee / work	Award	Result
1985	Hima Kathara	Best Supporting Actor	Won

=== Sumathi Awards ===
Year	Nominee / work	Award	Result
2003	Contribution to drama	U.W. Sumathipala Award	Won

=== Raigam Tele'es ===
Year	Nominee / work	Award	Result
2010	Contribution to drama	Prathibha Prabha Award	Won

== Filmography ==
Edirisinghe started his film career with Sadol Kandulu back in 1966, directed by Senator Reggie Perera. Through that, he performed dramatic and supportive roles in more than 35 films. In 1982, his film Adhishtanaya was screened at the International Mannheim Film Festival in Germany, where it received recognition, which he also took to the Ludwigshafen Film Congress.

- No. denotes the number of Sri Lankan films in the Sri Lankan cinema.

Year	No.	Film	Role	Notes	Ref.
1966	150	Sampatha			
1966	170	Sadol Kandulu	Monk	first cinematic appearance	
1969	205	Hari Maga	Monk		
1970	229	Sidadiyen Hayak			
1971	236	Poojithayo	Father		
1973	269	Matara Achchi	Cyril	also as Director, Screenwriter, Producer	
1975	322	Rajagedata Paraviyo		also as Director, Screenwriter	
1977	363	Sri Madara		also as Director, Screenwriter	
1979	433	Podi Malli	Palitharatne		
1981	497	Sathara Diganthaya		also as Director, Producer	
1982	513	Adhishtanaya		also as Director, Screenwriter, Producer	
1983	556	Karate Joe			
1984	586	Veera Madduma Bandara			
1984	594	Wadula	Galapathy Kandey Vidanaya	also as Director	
1984	597	Hima Kathara	Silva		
1985	626	Rosy			
1986	646	Koti Waligaya			
1990	712	Christhu Charithaya	Peduru		
1992	764	Muwan Palesse Kadira			
1994	797	Jayagrahanaya			
1994	804	Sujathaa	Colonel Weerakoon		
1996	864	Bithu Sithuwam			
1996	846	Body Guard			
1997	872	Tharanaya			
1998	904	Dorakada Marawa	Subha's father		
1999	918	Surangana Yahana			
2000	930	Undaya	Ranil Seneviratne		
2002	993	Sathkampa	Kumari's father		
2003	-	Mother Teresa	Sikh Government Inspector	Home movie	
2009	1132	Kanyavi	Janaka's father		
2010	1144	Ira Handa Yata	Monk		
2015	1237	Suhada Koka	Minister Narendrasinghe		
2017	-	Hath Pana	Story teller	Home movie	
2018	1303	Punchi Andare	Andare's grandfather		
TBD		Kondadeniye Hamuduruwo			
TBD		Sihina Sarungal			
