= Gehenu Lamai =

- Sinhala: ගැහැණු ළමයි
- Directed by: Sumitra Peries
- Screenplay by: Sumitra Peries
- Based on: Novel by Karunasena Jayalath by same name
- Produced by: Lester James Peries
- Starring: Vasanthi Chathurani; Ajith Jinadasa; Shyama Anandan
- Cinematography: M. S. Ananda
- Edited by: Sumitra Peries
- Music by: Nimal Mendis
- Production company: Lester Films
- Release date: 17 March 1978
- Running time: 110 minutes
- Country: Sri Lanka
- Language: Sinhala

Gehenu Lamai (Sinhala: ගැහැණු ළමයි / English: Girls) is a 1978 Sri Lankan drama film written and directed by Sumitra Peries and produced by her husband Lester James Peries. The film introduced Vasanthi Chathurani into Sinhala cinema. Along with her, film stars Ajith Jinadasa and Jenita Samaraweera in lead roles along with Shyama Anandan and Cyril Kothalawala. Music composed by Nimal Mendis. It is the 390th Sri Lankan film in the Sinhala cinema.

The film received positive reviews from critics and earned box office success. It was also recognised as Outstanding Film of the Year at the 1978 London Film Festival. A restored version of the film by the Film Heritage Foundation had its world premiere at Cannes Film Festival in 2025.

== Plot ==
Kusum witnesses Nimal leading a procession into their village.

Kusum then recalls her childhood spent with friend Nimal. She is taught by the older boy. Kusum then starts boarding school with a transition to her at an older age. She gains a friend in Podmini who admires Kusum's innocence.

When Kusum visits home, she takes to helping out at the home of Nimal's mother, Mrs. Satharasinghe. On one such visit Nimal engages Kusum in a relationship. They fall in love though Kusum starts to feel guilty due to her lower class status. Soma is chosen to be part of a beauty contest and Kusum and Nimal take the chance to spend time together.

Mrs. Satharasinghe finds out about the encounter and confronts Kusum causing her to reveal her relationship with Nimal. Mrs. Satharasinghe scolds her and relieves her of her duties helping out at their home. Driven by guilt, Kusum breaks off all contact with Nimal. Soma, meanwhile, gets pregnant and is abandoned by the father. Kusum starts to take care of the child.

Nimal becomes a teacher at Kusum's school causing them to come in contact again. She tries to keep their encounters formal though at the prodding of Podmini takes some notes from him ahead of another girl. The girl bullies Kusum before Podmini comes to her rescue. Kusum then rejects Nimal's help.

The story then returns to the present with Nimal arriving at the village. Kusum reveals she failed to get into college and is now unemployed. She questions if this is her fate.

== Cast ==
- Vasanthi Chathurani as Kusum Liyanage — A girl from a lower-class family who falls in love with Nimal, a member of a family she works for and had known since she was a kid. She's extremely obedient not willing to go against the wishes of her parents and other elders. Two more characters as Danthala Weerasinghe and Achala Weerasinghe.
- Ajith Jinadasa as Nimal Satharasinghe — A member of a higher class family who engages in a relationship with Kusum, a young passive girl who works at his house. He trains to be a teacher.
- Jenita Samaraweera as Soma Liyanage — The sister of Kusum. She, unlike her sister, goes against traditions and meets with an unfortunate result. Two more characters as Inoka Amarasena and Thanoja Dilhani.
- Shyama Ananda as Padmini — Best friend of Kusum who admires her innocence and tries to protect it from corruption.
- Trilicia Gunawardena as Mrs. Jenny Liyanage — Mother of Kusum and Soma. Works as a basket lady.
- Chitra Wakishta as Kamalawathie Satharasinghe — Haughty contradictory woman who praises her servant Kusum while viewing her as an unsuitable suitor to her son.
- Senaka Perera as Mr. Liyanage — Sick father of Kusum and Soma.
- Nimal Dayaratne as Gunapala — Friend of Podmini.
- Dayamanthi Pattiarachchi as Maduri — Cousin of Nimal who is westernized and looks down on Kusum.
- Joe Abeywickrema as Doctor — Cameo role by Abeywickrema of a doctor who supplies the Liyanage family with medicine free of charge.

== Songs ==
No.	Title	Lyrics	Singer(s)	Length
1.	"Wiyo Gee Gayena Hade"	Sunil Ariyaratne	Neela Wickramasinghe
2.	"Gahanu Lamaine"	Camilus Perera	Victor Rathnayake
