= Raigamayai Gampalayai =

2018 Sri Lankan comedy film

- Film poster
- Sinhala: රයිගමයයි ගම්පලයයි
- Directed by: Lalith Premathilake
- Written by: Lalith Premathilake
- Produced by: Tissa Nagodavithana Films
- Starring: Kumara Thirimadura; Giriraj Kaushalya; Piumi Hansamali
- Cinematography: Buddhika Mangala
- Edited by: Anura Bandara
- Music by: Shantha Peiris
- Distributed by: CEL Theatres
- Release date: 1 June 2018
- Country: Sri Lanka
- Language: Sinhala

Raigamayai Gampalayai (Sinhala: රයිගමයයි ගම්පලයයි) is a 2018 Sri Lankan Sinhala comedy film directed by Lalith Premathilake and co-produced by Haren Nagodavithana, Dilini Silva, Harshamana Panditharatne and Kushani Wijesinghe for Tissa Nagodavithana Films. It stars Kumara Thirimadura and Giriraj Kaushalya in lead roles along with Piumi Hansamali and Wijeratne Warakagoda. Music composed by Shantha Peiris.

The film also brings Kumara Thirimadura his maiden cinema playback singing.

== Cast ==
- Giriraj Kaushalya as Raigamaya
- Kumara Thirimadura as Gampalaya
- Piumi Hansamali as Siriyalatha
- Wijeratne Warakagoda as Arachchi, Village Head
- Rohit Mannage as Aaron mudalali
- Laxman Amarasekara as Thegiris, Arachchi's servant
- Malki Fernando
- Isuru Navoda
- Samitha Madushan
- Kaushi Tillakratne
- Hemantha Jayalath
- Ananda Wijethilake
- Buddhika Edirisinghe
