= Golu Hadawatha =

- Directed by: Lester James Peiris
- Written by: Reggie Siriwardena; Karunasena Jayalath (novel)
- Produced by: P. E. E. Anthonypillai
- Starring: Wickrama Bogoda; Anula Karunathilaka
- Cinematography: M. S. Ananda
- Edited by: Sumitra Gunawardena; Edwin Leetin
- Music by: Premasiri Khemadasa
- Distributed by: Lanka Studio
- Release date: 24 April 1969
- Running time: 120 minutes
- Country: Sri Lanka
- Language: Sinhala

Golu Hadawatha (Translation: The Silent Heart) was a popular 1968 Sinhalese language romance movie directed by Maestro Lester James Peiris. Wickrama Bogoda and Anula Karunathilaka acted the lead roles of Sugath and Dhammhi. The movie's story is based on the novel Golu Hadawatha written by Karunasena Jayalath in 1962, based on his school time experiences and memories. Regi Siriwardena wrote the screenplay and Veteran Sinhala musician Premasiri Khemadasa composed the music. Golu Hadawatha is acclaimed as a movie that set a milestone in Sinhala moviemaking. It introduced a new cinematic format to the romance and love movie genre. The movie departs from the then traditional movie style; no hero, heroine, ("Boy" and "Girl") no enemy or villain, Joker, no songs, and fights etc. Based on a romantic and emotional attachment between a teenage boy and a girl who study in the same class of their school, Golu Hadawatha is regarded as one of the landmarks in Sri Lankan Cinema.

It was awarded the Best Film, Best Director and Best Actress of the year at the prestigious Sarasaviya Awards Festival. The film, which depicts the love affair between two school going teenagers, created a sensation among Sri Lankan film lovers, both young and old, and is considered a landmark in the history of Sri Lankan cinema.

The original script was being written by Piyasiri Gunaratne and Karunasena Jayalath. Before being finished, Piyasiri Gunaratna casually mentioned he was working on the script to Lester James Peiris. A few weeks later, the newspapers announced Lester James Peiris was about to shoot the film. It came out that Mr. Pieris took advantage of the situation, took over the script from Karunasena Jayalath and so de facto stole the script as well as the film from Piyasiri Gunaratne.

== Plot ==
The first half of the film depicts the story through the eyes of Sugath and the next half the audience see the story through the eyes of Dhammi. Damayanthi "Dhammi" Kariyawasam (Anula Karunathilaka) is a mischievous school girl. Sugath Weerasekara (Wickrama Bogoda) is a shy and introverted boy who is new to Dhammi's school. He is quiet and gifted at schoolwork. Dhammi is immediately attracted to him and they become friends. The friendship eventually develops into a special relationship.

Sugath, who has lost his parents when he was very young, has a brother who is attending university. He tells his brother, Sarath (Wijeratne Warakagoda) about his relationship with Dhammi.

On the day of the final exam, Dhammi tells Sugath not to keep any further hopes about her.

Sugath is heartbroken and comes home to meet Sarath. In the meantime, he passes his exams with flying colors and Sarath marries Champa (Sriyani Amarasena), who is willing to accept Sugath as her own brother.

But Sugath is unable to forget Dhammi, and keeps thinking about her and begins to drink heavily to alleviate his pain. He also loses his job as a teacher and leaves the home he shares with his brother's family.

One day, Dhammi comes to meet Sugath and reveals the secret for her sudden change of heart. She tells Sugath that she loved him despite knowing that she would never have the chance to become his wife. She begs for forgiveness from him for playing with his feelings and asks him to change for her sake. Dejected, Sugath returns home, broken-hearted.

== Cast ==
- Wickrama Bogoda as Sugath Weerasekera
- Anula Karunathilaka as Damayanthi
- Wijeratne Warakagoda as Sarath
- Sriyani Amarasena as Champa
- Sudesh Gunaratne as Wimal
- Grace Jayamanne
- Mapa Gunaratne
- Sunila Abeysekera
- Chitra Wakishta
- Somi Meegama
- Somapala Dharmapriya
- A. P. Gunaratne
- Thalatha Gunasekara
- Malkanthi Nandasiri as Classmate

== Popularity ==
Movie impacted the then literature, music, and popular culture among the young generation in the 60s. Sugath and Dhammi became icons of love. Indrani Wijebandara and Sisira Senaratne duo sang a duet "Aadarei mama Aadarei - Dhammi thavamath aadarei, Sugath thavamath aadarei", in which, the words were composed by Karunasena Jayalath, became quite a popular radio song after the movie but was not sung for the film, and not in it.
