= Buddhist Ladies' College =

- Colombo 7 Sri Lanka

Information
- Type: Private
- Motto: The Utmost for the Highest
- Religious affiliation: Buddhist
- Established: 20 May 1954; 72 years ago
- Founder: Mohandas De Mel
- Principal: Ajantha Pahathkumbura
- Grades: Lower nursery to grade 13
- Gender: Girls
- Age: 3 to 18
- Colours: Brown and beige
- Affiliation: Ministry for Education

Buddhist Ladies' College is a private girls' primary and secondary school in Colombo, Sri Lanka. The school was established by Mohandas De Mel on May 20, 1954. It is one of the leading government-approved schools in Colombo. The first principal of the school was Clara Motwani. The current principal is Padmaseeli Lyanage.

== History ==
The Buddhist Ladies' College is a popular school situated in Town Hall, Kurunduwatta, Colombo. It was first established as a private school and remains as a private school. The school's motto is: The Utmost for the Highest. It was previously part of the same school as Vishaka College, but the schools were later separated.

== Achievements ==
Buddhist Ladies' College was the first school whose students used to jump through a fire ring at the gymnastics display.

The Buddhist Ladies' College choir achieved All Island first place in a competition in 2017 (open category), and successfully advanced to the semifinals of the Ananda College Vocalize generation five competitions in 2019.

== Alumni ==
Name	Notability	Reference
Shayama Ananda	Actress	
Somalatha Subasinghe	Children's playwright, founder of the Children’s and Youth Theatre Organisation	
Deepani Silva	Film, stage and teledrama actress	
