= M. S. Ananda =

Sri Lankan filmmaker

- Born: M. S. Ananda; April 21, 1933
- Died: June 25, 2016 (aged 83)
- Occupations: Director, Cinematographer, Producer, Screenplay writer
- Spouse: Violet Ananda
- Children: 2
- Relatives: Shyama Ananda (daughter)

M. S. Ananda (Tamil: எம். எஸ். ஆனந்தன்; Sinhala: එම්. එස්. ආනන්දන්; 22 April 1933 – 25 June 2016) was a director in Sri Lankan cinema, as well as a cinematographer, screenwriter and producer.

== Personal life ==
He was married to longtime partner Violet Ananda who was also a film producer. The couple has two daughters. Their elder daughter Shyama Ananda is a popular film actress who acted in popular Shyama film series directed by her father. Shayama is married Saliya Perera, former captain of the Thurstan College cricket team on 15 December 1980. They have a daughter, Mandeera DeMel and a son Ritchie Perera.

M. S. Ananda died on 24 June 2016 at the age of 83. His remains were laid at Jayaratne Funeral parlour in Borella. The final rites was held at the Kanatte Cemetery on 26 June 2016.

== Career ==
He was the chief cameraman of the Ceylon studio. In 1959, Ananda started to work as the cinematographer with the film Gehenu Geta. Then he worked as the assistant cinematographer in the film Ranmuthu Duwa, first colour full-length film of Sri Lanka. Then he worked as the cinematographer in several blockbuster movies such as Nidhanaya, Golu Hadawatha, Madol Duwa, Gehenu Lamai and Akkara Paha.

Later he started to direct the film. His maiden cinema direction came through 1964 film Sithaka Mahima. The first film he directed and produced was Prashawanna, in which his daughter Shyama played a dual role. Then he directed the popular film franchise Shyama by introducing his daughter Shyama Ananda into silver screen. He directed four films in Shyama franchise - Mage Nangi Shyama, Chandi Shyama, Hello Shyama and Mama Baya Nehe Shyama. In 1965 film Satha Panaha directed by Ananda became highly popularized due to the song Chandrame Re Paya Awa sung by H.R. Jothipala.

== Filmography ==
=== As director ===
Year	Film	Other roles	Ref.
1964	Sithaka Mahima		
1965	Satha Panaha		
1966	Athulweema Thahanam		
1969	Preweshamwanna	Screenwriter	
1975	Mage Nangi Shyama	Screenwriter, cinematographer	
1978	Chandi Shyama	Screenwriter, producer, cinematographer	
1982	Hello Shyama	Producer, screenwriter, cinematographer	
1995	Mama Baya Ne Shyama	Screenwriter, cinematographer	

=== As cinematographer ===
Year	Film	Ref.
1959	Gehenu Geta	
1962	Ranmuthu Duwa	
1963	Deepashika	
1964	Heta Pramada Wadi	
1964	Kala Kala De Pala Pala De	
1967	Sadol Kandulu	
1968	Golu Hadawatha	
1969	Senehasa	
1970	Akkara Paha	
1970	Priyanga	
1972	Nidhanaya	
1976	Madol Duwa	
1978	Gehenu Lamai	
1981	Ran Ethana	
1984	Hima Kathara	
