= Wijeratne Warakagoda =

Sri Lankan dramatist

Wijeratne Warakagoda විජේරත්න වරකාගොඩ
- Born: Rajakaruna Navaratne Atapattu Mudiyanselage Wijeratne Banda Warakagoda; 21 November 1933 (age 92); Kurunegala, Sri Lanka
- Education: St. Anne’s College Kurunegala; Ananda College Colombo
- Occupations: Actor, voice artist, singer
- Years active: 1960 - present
- Spouse: Chitra Warakagoda (m. 1970)
- Children: 2
- Mother: Basnayake Mudiyanselage Ran Menika

Rajakaruna Navaratne Atapattu Mudiyanselage Wijeratne Banda Warakagoda (Born 21 November 1933; as Sinhala: විජේරත්න වරකාගොඩ), popularly known as Wijeratne Warakagoda, is an actor in Sri Lankan cinema, stage drama and television. Career spanning more than six decades, Warakagoda is also a singer and a voice artist in Radio Ceylon. He is best known for the role "Korale Mahaththaya" in radio sitcom Muwan Palessa.

== Personal life ==
Wijeratne Warakagoda was born on 21 November 1933, in a small village in Kurunegala although his father's ancestry home town was Warakagoda in Harispattuwa, Kandy. His father Madduma Bandara was a police sergeant by profession. His mother was Basnayake Mudiyanselage Ran Menika, a housewife. His maternal grandfather was a Korale chief. Since his father worked for the police, he went to seven schools.

He studied at St. Anne’s College Kurunegala for nine years and ended up at Ananda College, Colombo. During school times, he was excellent in sports such as 5000m, 800m as well as for singing.

After school life, he first worked as junior clerk in a Kurunegala bank. Meanwhile, he applied for the government clerk exam and became the second from Sri Lanka. The month after the results, he got the job in the Kachcheriya. After few years of working, he applied for the Sri Lanka Police Service and became a Police Inspector in June 1956 after doing a written examination in Kandy and going to the Katukuranda Police Training College, Kalutara. After training, he was first appointed in Pettah Police and later to the Fort police. From there he was sent to the Police Transport Division for training. He served it for eight years as a Sub Inspector in crime division while he continued acting on stage. He is one of the active inspectors at the hospital when Prime Minister S. W. R. D. Bandaranaike was shot and taken to the hospital.

In 1970, Warakagoda married Chithra Iranganie Jayasinghe, who was also a co-actor in Henry Jayasena's stage play Kuveni. The wedding was celebrated on 28 January 1970 at Hotel Taprobane. They had a son and a daughter; Vindya, born in 1972 is a dancer and Jananath born in 1977, is a musician, singer and a dancer.

== Career ==
In 1960 Warakagoda was selected as an A-Grade singer in Radio Ceylon. First he sang the song Yanawada Maa Dama Sundari by Sisira Senaratne. In, 1962, film director Robin Tampoe invited Warakagoda for his film Suhada Divi Piduma, which marked his cinema career. Then, he acted in few Tampoe's films such as Samaje Api Okkoma Samanai and Sudu Sande Kali Wala.

In 1963, he acted in his first stage drama in Ajasaththa produced by Wimal Nawagamuwa. For his role as "Old King Bimbisara", he won the best actor award in the style section at Drama competition. Then Henry Jayasena invited him to play the role of "Puraka" in the drama Kuveni. He continued to act in many plays produced by Jayasena, such as Apata Puthe Magak Nathe, Mana Ranjana Wada Warjana, Hunuwataye Kathawa and Diriya Mawa Saha Aege Daruwo.

In 1964, Ediriweera Sarachchandra invited him to play the role of "Puraka" in the critically acclaimed stage play Maname. His relationship with Warakagoda Prof. Sarachchandra continued to grow, where Warakagoda acted his stage plays including, Sinhabahu, Prematho Jayathi Soko, Kapuwa Kapothi Mahasara and Lomahansa. He then played as "Jasaya" in the stage play Jasaya Lenchina produced by his classmate Dayananda Gunawardena. He later won Governor's Award for Best Stylized Actor at the 1963 State Drama Festival.

He moved to radio drama as a voice artist for the radio drama Muwan Pelessa one of the longest running radio dramas in the recorded history of Sri Lankan radio. He played the roles of John Mcwood, Arachchila and Korale, who became the only actor to have acted in 2700 episodes of a radio drama in the history. With that drma, Warakagoda became the only artist who has played a single role in the radio drama for over 55 years. Since Muwan Pelessa was only launched in late 1963, the SLBC has no record of it, and the only evidence to show that it was begun on March 12, 1964, was a photo of its founder Dr. Somaratne. The character started as "Arachchila" but later changed to "Korale" when Mudalinayaka moved to US when the JVP started its turmoil on April 5, 1971. During his peak time in acting career, Warakagoda went Saudi Arabia in 1982 to earn money. After return to Sri Lanka, he acted in the play Maha Giri Daba produced by Jayalath Manoratne. He also worked as Chief Security Officer of the Oruwala Steel Corporation for few years.

Warakagoda served as the Deputy Director General on the Tower Hall Theatre Foundation until 1990. In 2019, he was honored with Janabhimani Honorary Award at the Bandaranaike Memorial International Conference Hall.

=== Theater works ===
- Apata Puthe Magak Nathe
- Ajasaththa
- Arunata Pera
- Hora Police
- Hunuwataye Kathawa
- Kuveni
- Maname
- Manaranjana Wedawarjana
- Mandela Mandela
- Sinhabahu
- Suhada Divi Piduma

=== Television serials ===
- Alli and Galli
- Amarapuraya
- Anne
- Chakraangee
- Dese Disnaya
- Haye Pahara
- Indrachapa
- Jeewithaya Lassanai
- Katu Kurullo
- Kele Handa
- Kinduru Adaviya
- Korale Mahaththaya
- Maada Eyama Wiya
- Mayaratne
- Mawathe Api
- Monaravila
- Pinkanda Simona
- Punchi Weerayo
- Puja
- Raja Bhavana
- Rathriya
- Raththarana Neth
- Sagare Se Man Adarei
- Sakisanda Suwaris
- Sanda Ginigath Rathriya
- Sathyaya
- Shoba
- Sidangana
- Situ Gedara
- Sive Diya Dahara
- Snehaye Daasi
- Sooriya Daruwo
- Sooriya Nayo
- Suddilage Kathawa
- Sujatha
- Sulang Kapolla
- Suwanda Obai Amme
- Three-wheel Malli
- Tikiri and Ungi
- Varanaya
- Wara Peraliya
- Yaddehi Gedara
- Yes Boss

== Filmography ==
Key
†	Denotes films that have not yet been released

Year	Film	Role	Ref.
1962	Suhada Divi Piduma		
1963	Gamperaliya	Rathnapura doctor	
1964	Samaje Api Okkoma Samanai	Mob member	
1965	La Dalu		
1965	Adarayay Karunaway		
1966	Sithala Wathura		
1966	Delovak Athara	Police inspector	
1966	Parasathu Mal	Tabla player	
1967	Hathara Kendare		
1968	Golu Hadawatha	Sarath	
1969	Samaja Sathuro		
1969	Binaramalee	Heen Banda	
1970	Akkara Paha	Teacher	
1970	Priyanga		
1970	Thun Man Handiya	Actor. also as playback singer	
1971	Samanala Kumariyo Samaga Api Kawadath Surayo		
1971	Maha Hene Riri Yaka	Richard Perera	
1972	Nidhanaya	Silva	
1980	Muwan Palessa 2	Korale Mahaththaya	
1981	Beddegama		
1981	Bandura Mal		
1981	Anjana		
1981	Aradhana		
1982	Kale Mal		
1982	Malata Noena Bambaru		
1982	Kadawunu Poronduwa remake	Psych ward nurse	
1983	Chutte		
1983	Senehasaka Kandulu		
1983	Sister Mary	Judge	
1983	Rathu Makara	Inspector	
1984	Hitha Honda Kollek		
1984	Ammai Duwai		
1984	Arunata Pera	Banda	
1984	Batti		
1985	Mihidum Salu	Arachchi Mahaththaya	
1985	Mawubima Nathnam Maranaya		
1985	Rajina		
1985	Rosy		
1985	Du Daruwo		
1985	Varsity Kella		
1985	Kirimaduwal		
1986	Dushyanthi		
1986	Sura Saradiyel	Ana Berakaru	
1988	Chandingeth Chandiya		
1994	Yuwathipathi	Janaraja's father	
1997	Punaruthpaththiya		
1997	Maha Mera Usata	Sarath	
1997	The Second Jungle Book: Mowgli & Baloo	Engineer	
1998	Gini Avi Saha Gini Keli	Party singer	
2001	Sundara Warada		
2001	Rosa Wasanthe	Hansamali's father	
2003	Mother Teresa of Calcutta		
2006	Samu Noganna Sugandika		
2006	Double Game		
2012	Wassane Senehasa	Mayadunne	
2012	Daruwane	Father	
2012	Prathiroo	Bookstore owner	
2013	Ira Laga Wadi	Wijeratne	
2014	Sathiyakata Mata Rata Baradenda	also as playback singer	
2016	Paththini	Kovalan's father	
2018	Raigamayai Gampalayai	Arachchi	
2022	CineMa		
TBA	Anora		
TBA	Gunananda Himi Migettuwatte		
TBA	Wessanthara Raja Dawasa †		

== Awards ==
- Sarasaviya Awards - Merit Award for performance in Golu Hadawatha - 1969
- President’s Merit Award for performance in Kele Mal - 1984
- OCIC and President’s Best Actor Award for performance in Arunata Pera - 1985
- Raigam Tele'es Prathibha Prabha Award - 2018

== Songs ==
Although he doesn't sing often, some of his songs have been written into the hearts of many music lovers in Sri Lanka. Below are some of his most famous songs.

- Rangahala dan atha ada andure (රඟහල දැන් ඇත අඩ අඳුරේ)
- Hiru Payanawa / Manike hinahenawa (හිරු පායනවා)
- Mihiri Sihinayaka Dewatunu (මිහිරි සිහිනයක දැවටුනු)
- Yannem Dakna (යන්නම් දක්නා ඒ ලාලනී)
- Sihale Mal (සිහලේ මල්)
- Atharaman Wela Ma (අතරමන් වෙලා මා) - (Duet)
- Wandanawe Yamu (වන්දනාවේ යමු පේවීලා)
- Pama Wela Wahapan (පමා වෙලා වහපන් වැහි වලාවේ)
