= Prathibha Prabha Award =

The Raigam Tele'es Prathibha Prabha Award is presented annually in Sri Lanka by the Kingdom of Raigam for the artists who devoted their life to the improvement of Sri Lankan cinema, theatre and television.

The award was first given in 2007. The following is a list of the winners of this award since 2007.

== Award list in each year ==
Year	Award Winner	ref
2007	Dr. D.B. Nihalsinghe	
2008	Deshabandu Shan Wickremesinghe	
2009	Titus Thotawatte	
2010	Kalasuri Sathischandra Edirisinghe	
2011	Lucien Bulathsinhala; K.A. Milton Perera	
2012	Deshabandu Tony Ranasinghe	
2013	Kalasuri Jayalath Manoratne	
2014	Parakrama Niriella	
2015	Cyril Wickramage	
2016	Ravindra Randeniya	
2017	Malani Fonseka	
2018	Wijeratne Warakagoda	
2019	Sriyani Amarasena	
2020	Sumitra Peries	
2021	Suvineetha Weerasinghe	
2024	Anoja Weerasinghe	
