= Piumi Hansamali =

Sri Lankan Actress and model

Piumi Hansamali Gomez
- පියුමි හංසමාලි
- Born: Piumi Hansamali Gomez; 22 November 1992 (age 33); Colombo, Sri Lanka
- Education: Sri Sobitha Vidyalaya, Rajagiriya
- Occupations: Actor, model, adult entertainer
- Years active: 2011–present
- Known for: Wassanaye Sanda
- Height: 5 ft 5 in (165 cm)
- Children: 1
- Parents: P. Nihal Lakshman Gomez (father); L. Wasanthi Perera (mother)

Piumi Hansamali Gomez (born 22 November 1992), is a Sri Lankan actress, television personality, beauty pageant contestant, and model. She appeared in the serial Rithu, and films Wassanaye Sanda and Lucknow.

== Early life and education ==
Hansamali was born in Kalapluwawa, the only child of Nihal Lakshman Gomez and Wasanthi Perera. Both her parents worked abroad. She completed her education at Sri Sobitha Vidyalaya, Rajagiriya. In 2011, she joined Side Images Modeling School conducted by Rozanne Diasz.

== Career ==
Hansamali started her career in Ramp Modelling. In 2014, Hansamali made her television debut with the television serial Rithu telecast in ITN directed by Shantha Soyza. In the serial, she played the lead title role opposite to popular actor Vishwa Kodikara. Even though the serial became popular, it was cancelled at the beginning of 2015 due to political pressure.

In 2015, she participated in Mrs Globe and then in 2016, contested in Mrs. Noble Queen of the Universe held in Malaysia. In 2017, she competed in Best Model in Asia in Future Fashion Faces World held in Turkey.

Then in 2018, she made her maiden cinematic appearance with the drama film Wassanaye Sanda directed by Udayakantha Warnasuriya. In the film, she played the lead character of 'Mihiri'. In 2019, she was invited to act in Malayalam cinema Lucknow directed by Anil Kumar. In the film, she played the lead role alongside Sri Lankan dramatist, Jackson Anthony. This is the second time that a Sri Lankan actress has been in such a position since Yashoda Wimaladharma played the lead role in an Indian film in 1992.

Apart from acting, she also worked as a television presenter for the musical programme Music Live from 2014 to 2016. She has appeared in several television commercials including "Sunlight," "TVS Bikes," "Fortune Cooking Oil", and Hacks".

== Personal life ==
Hansamali is married and has a son.

== Filmography ==
=== Selected music video appearances ===
- Omari Latha by Dushyanth Weeraman
- Saraviye by Eranga Lanka
- Modha by Shan Hasim
- Thahanam by Arshula Cooray
- Denuna by Sahan / Kaizer
- Vaishyaviyakda Ma by Amila Perera and Amila Nadeeshani

Year	Film	Role	Ref.
2018	Wassanaye Sanda	Mihiri	
2018	Raigamayai Gampalayai	Siriyalatha	
TBD	Lucknow		
