= Kalyani Inscriptions =

Buddhist inscriptions in Myanmar

- Author: King Dhammazedi
- Original title: ကလျာဏီကျောက်စာ
- Translator: Taw Sein Ko
- Language: Mon; Pali in Burmese script
- Series: Burmese chronicles
- Genre: Chronicle, History
- Publication date: 1476 (updates in 1477 and 1479) (Note: The extant inscriptions do not state when they were inscribed. The narrative on the inscriptions suggests the slabs were first inscribed on or shortly after the full moon day of Migasira (Nadaw) 838 ME (30 November 1476) when the first set of re-ordination ceremonies were concluded. The slabs also include a few lines on two other groups of monks, who did not get back from Sri Lanka with the first group of returning monks. Per (Taw 1892: 83), the second group got back on the 13th waxing of Asalha (Waso) 839 ME (22 June 1477), and per (Taw 1892: 84) the last group on the 14th waning of Kattika (Tazaungmon) 841 ME (12 November 1479). The small number of lines on the later returnees suggests the slabs were probably updated after each group's arrival—as opposed to all the slabs being inscribed only after all the monks had returned. In fact, per (Taw 1892: 84), six senior monks and four attendant monks had died, and never returned. It is unclear if Dhammazedi would have waited for all the monks to have arrived in order to record his major reformation effort. At any rate, Taw Sein Ko (Taw 1892) assigned 1476 as the inscription date while C.O. Blagden (Blagden 1935: 551) gave c. 1480.)
- Publication place: Ramanya
- English publication date: 1892

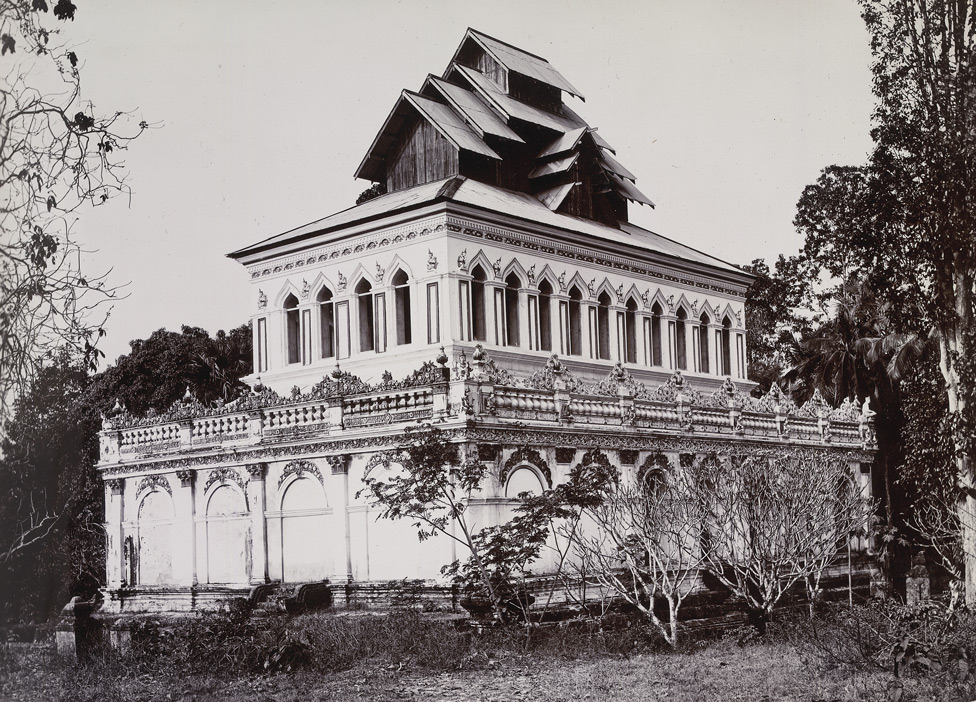
Kalyani Sima hall, home to the inscriptions

The Kalyani Inscriptions (Burmese: ကလျာဏီကျောက်စာ), located in Bago, Myanmar, are the stone inscriptions constructed by King Dhammazedi of Hanthawaddy Pegu between 1476 and 1479. Located at the Kalyani Ordination Hall (Kalyani Sima) outside Bago, the inscriptions commemorate the reformation of Burmese Buddhism in Ceylon's Mahavihara tradition between 1476 and 1479. The inscriptions are the most important sources on religious contacts between Burma and Sri Lanka.

King Dhammazedi, a former monk, proclaimed in the inscriptions that Buddhism in Ramanya (Lower Burma) was in decline as sectarianism had developed and the Orders had grown further and further away from their original purity. He emulated great model Buddhist kings Anawrahta of Pagan, Sithu II of Pagan and Parakramabahu I of Ceylon who, according to him, kept the religion pure and reformed the sangha in the "orthodox" brand of Theravada Buddhism which he was attempting to do and that he had sent the sangha to Ceylon to be re-ordained in the Mahavihara tradition as King Sithu II had done.

The inscriptions were so named because the sangha of Lower Burma were re-ordained on the Kalyani river (near modern Colombo). The language of the first three stones is Pali, inscribed using the Burmese script. The rest of the stones are Mon translation. The stones are 7 feet (2.1 m) high, 4 feet 2 inches (1.27 m) wide, and 1-foot-3-inch (0.38 m) thick. They are inscribed on both faces, with 70 lines of text to each face, three letters to an inch (2.54 cm).

Some of the original stone slabs were destroyed by the Portuguese in the early 17th century and Konbaung forces in 1757. Several preserved palm-leaf manuscripts survived. Taw Sein Ko translated the inscriptions from the palm-leaf manuscripts into English and Pali written in Latin script.

== Bibliography ==
- Aung-Thwin, Michael A. (2005). The Mists of Rāmañña: The Legend that was Lower Burma (illustrated ed.). Honolulu: University of Hawai'i Press. ISBN 9780824828868.
- Blagden, C.O. (1935). "Epigraphica Zeylanica". Journal of the Royal Asiatic Society of Great Britain and Ireland. London: Cambridge University Press for the Society.
- Sirisena, W.M. (1978). Sri Lanka and South-East Asia: Political, Religious and Cultural Relations from A.D. C. 1000 to C. 1500 (illustrated ed.). Brill Archive. p. 186. ISBN 9789004056602.
- Taw, Sein Ko (1892). The Kalyani Inscriptions Erected by King Dhammaceti at Pegu: Text and Translation (PDF). Rangoon: The Superintendent, Government Printing, Burma.
