= Kalyani Ordination Hall =

Buddhist ordination hall in Bago, Myanmar

- ကလျာဏီသိမ်
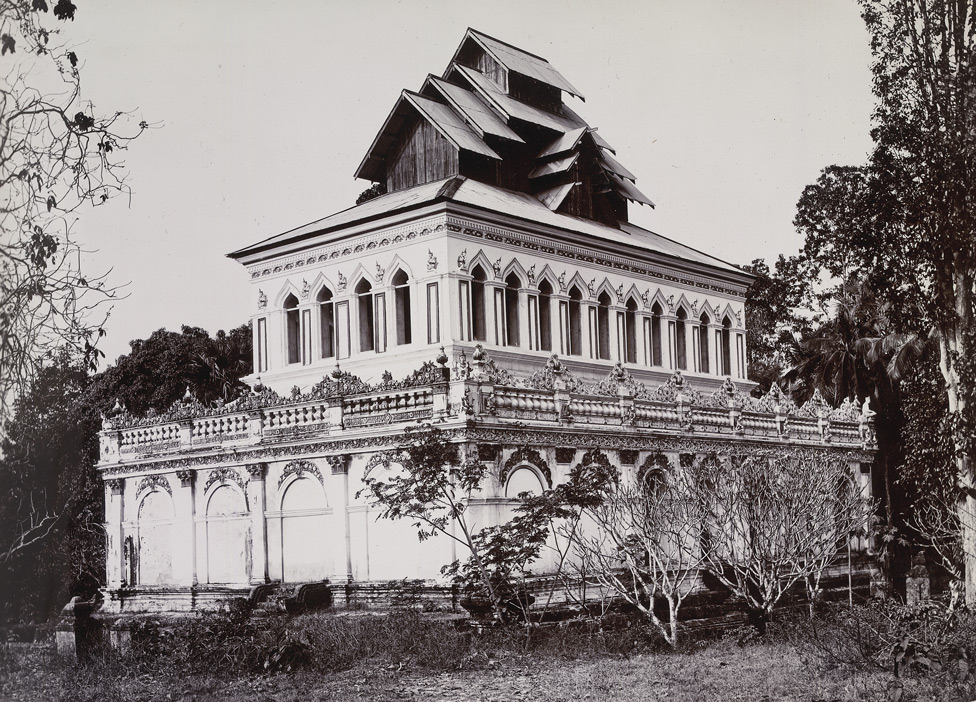
- The Kalyani Ordination Hall in 1907

- Location within Myanmar

Religion
- Affiliation: Buddhism
- Sect: Theravada Buddhism
- Region: Bago Region
- Year consecrated: 24 November 1476; 9th waxing of Nadaw 838 ME

Location
- Municipality: Bago
- Country: Myanmar
- Interactive map of Kalyani Ordination Hall
- Coordinates: 17.333145°N 96.464378°E

Architecture
- Founder: Dhammazedi
- Completed: 22 November 1476 (Note: (Taw 1892: 92): Construction of the ordination hall was completed on Saturday [sic], the 7th waxing of Migasira (Nadaw) 838 ME (Friday, 22 November 1476); King Dhammazedi visited the hall on the 8th waxing (23 November 1476); and the hall formally received the name Kalyani Sima, and per (Taw 1892: 95, 97) hosted the first re-ordination ceremony on the 9th waxing (24 November 1476).); 7th waxing of Nadaw 838 ME

Kalyāṇī Ordination Hall (Burmese: ကလျာဏီသိမ်, Pali: Kalyāṇī Sīmā) is a Buddhist ordination hall located in Bago, Myanmar. The ordination hall is a major pilgrimage site, and houses the Kalyani Inscriptions, a set of 10 sandstone pillars inscribed in Pali and Mon in 1480. The inscriptions are important records of Theravada history of Buddhism and of that era.

== History ==
The ordination hall was first built by King Dhammazedi of the Hanthawaddy kingdom in 1476 to re-ordain the kingdom's Buddhist monks, in an effort to purify the kingdom's Sangha, which had undergone several internal schisms. To this end, in 1476, Dhammazedi sent 22 senior monks and their disciples to Sri Lanka, where they were re-ordained at the Kelaniya Raja Maha Vihara. After the monks had returned, Dhammazedi built the Kalyani Ordination Hall, which derives its name from the Kelani River in Sri Lanka. The construction of the first Kalyani Ordination Hall spurred construction of similarly-named Kalyani Ordination Halls; throughout the Hanthawaddy Kingdom, 9 large ones and 107 small ones were constructed.

The ordination hall was destroyed several times. Portuguese explorers burnt the structure in 1599, and King Alaungpaya destroyed the hall during his invasion of Bago in 1757. The ordination hall was also destroyed by fires and earthquakes, including an earthquake in 1930 that levelled the structure completely. The extant ordination hall was reconstructed in 1954.

== Bibliography ==
- Sein Ko Taw (1892). The Kalyani Inscriptions Erected by King Dhammaceti at Pegu in 1476 A.D. Text and Translation (PDF). Rangoon: The Superintendent, Government Printing, Burma.
