= Kelaniya Raja Maha Vihara =

Buddhist temple in Kelaniya, Sri Lanka

- කැලණිය රජ මහා විහාරය
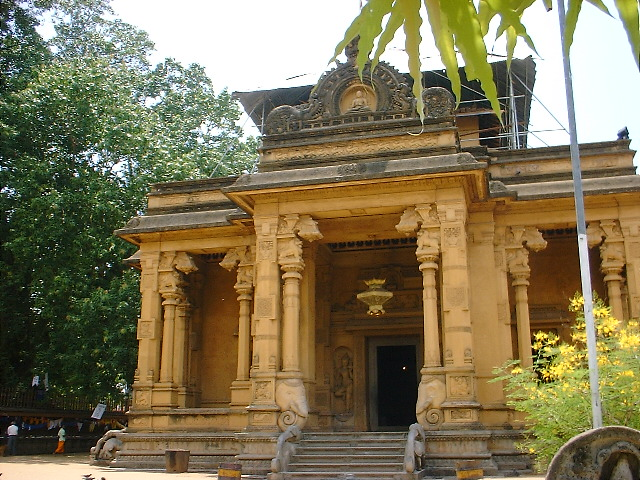

- Location within Sri Lanka

Religion
- Affiliation: Buddhism
- District: Gampaha
- Province: Western Province
- Year consecrated: 580 BC (Approx.2600 years ago)

Location
- Location: Kelaniya, Sri Lanka
- Municipality: Kelaniya
- Coordinates: 06°57′11.3″N 79°55′06.7″E

Architecture
- Type: Buddhist Temple

The Kelaniya Raja Maha Vihara or Kelaniya Temple is a Buddhist temple in Kelaniya, Sri Lanka. It is located 11 km (6.8 mi) north-east of Colombo. The current chief incumbent (chief priest) is Venerable Professor Kollupitiye Mahinda Sangharakkhitha Thera.

The temple has often been associated with the rise and fall of Sri Lanka, with the popular saying that as the Kelaniya temple rose, Sri Lanka rose and as it fell, the country and its administration fell. It has thus had a deep association with the political powers of the country. As such, the temple is frequently visited by politicians both government and opposition.

== History ==
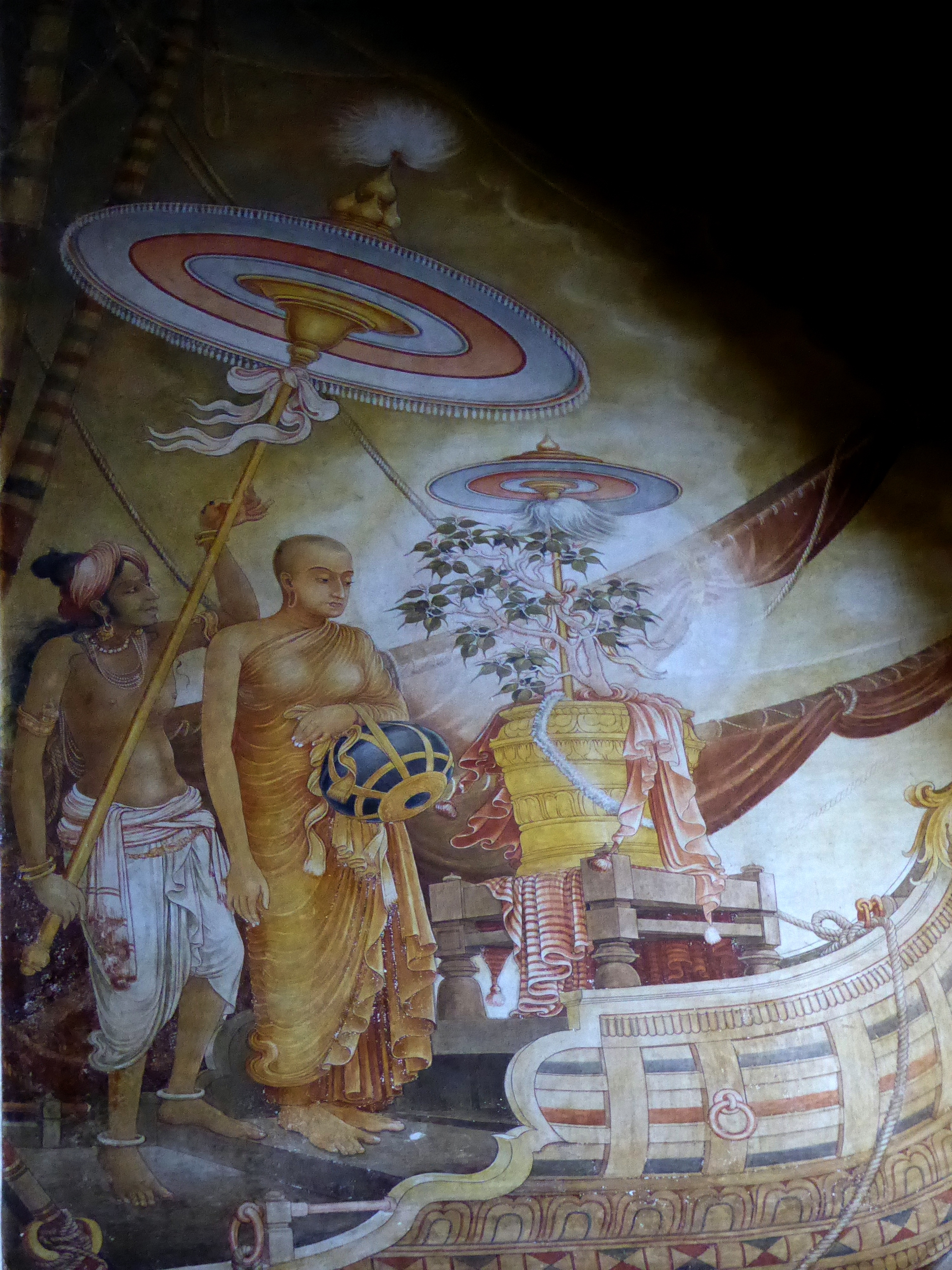
Sanghamitta, daughter of Emperor Ashoka, bringing a sapling of the right branch of the Bodhi tree to Sri Lanka. Mural at Kelaniya Raja Maha Vihara.

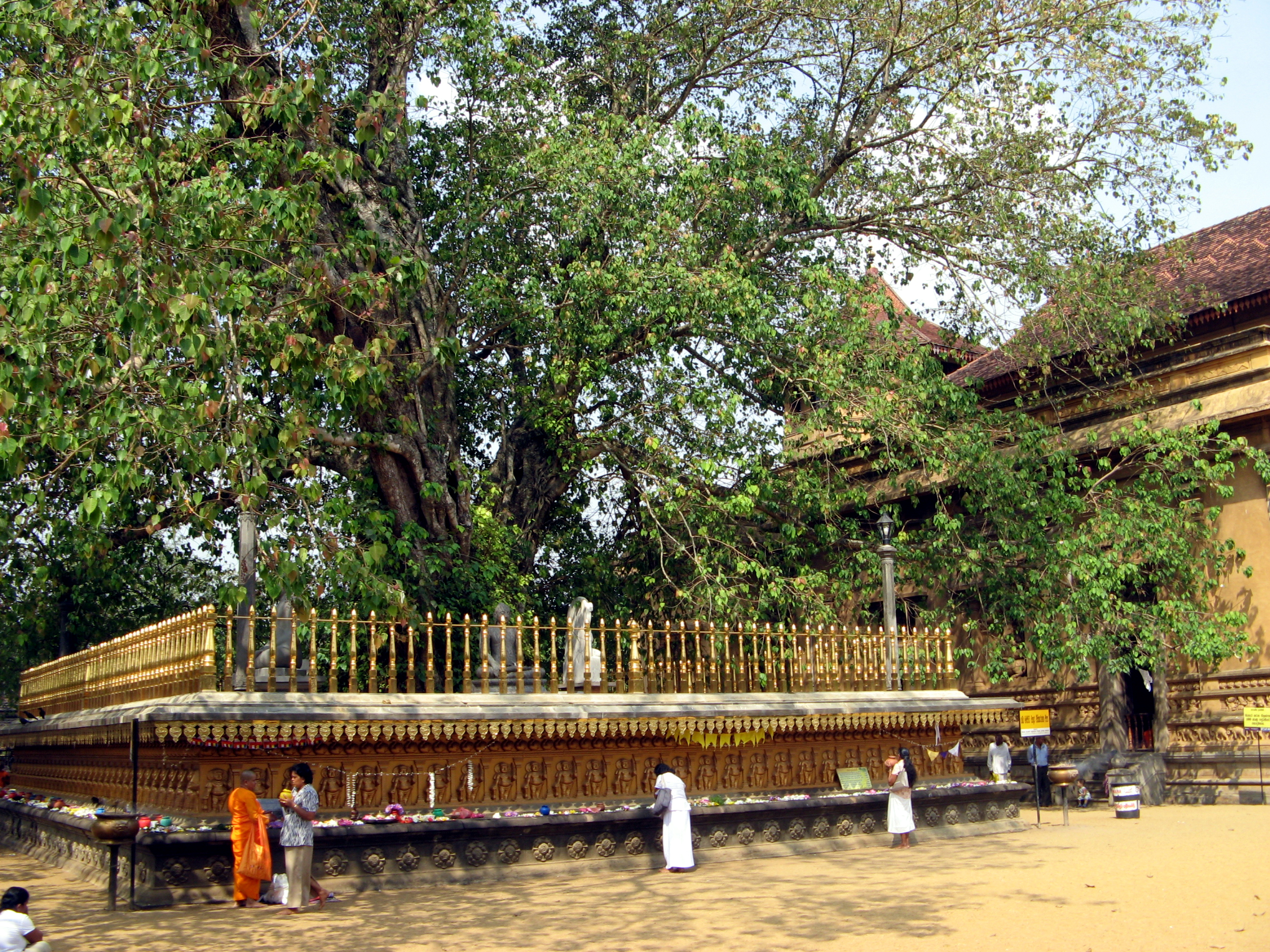
Bodhi tree at the temple

Buddhists believe the temple to have been hallowed during the third and final visit of the Buddha to Sri Lanka, eight years after gaining enlightenment. Its history would thus go back to before 500 BCE. The Mahawansa records that the original Stupa at Kelaniya enshrined a gem-studded throne on which the Buddha sat and preached. The temple flourished during the Kotte era but much of its land was confiscated during the Portuguese Empire. Under the Dutch empire, however, there were new gifts of land and under the patronage of King Kirthi Sri Rajasingha the temple was rebuilt. It was refurbished in the first half of the 20th century with the help of Helena Wijewardene.

The Kelaniya Stupa enshrined a gem-studded throne on which the Buddha sat and preached. Buddha's second visit to Nagadeepaya, Sri Lanka was in the fifth year of enlightenment to settle a dispute between two Naga Kings, Chulodara and Mahodara over the possession of a Gem Studded throne. After having listened to the Dhamma sermons by Buddha the Naga kings paid homage to Buddha with overwhelming faith and the throne was offered to Buddha by two Naga kings.

The Naga King Maniakkika- Ruler of Kelaniya who also listened to Buddha's Dharma sermons pleaded for a souvenir to worship. So the throne was gifted to him by Buddha. King Maniakkika in turn constructed a Cetiya (Stupa) covering the Gem studded Throne in Kelaniya for thousands of devotees to worship and invited Buddha to visit the holy site.

Buddha together with 500 Arahats (Supremely enlightened beings) visited Kelaniya and preached Dhamma, on Wesak Poya Day, after eighth year of enlightenment as Buddha (in 580 BC which is approx. 2600 years back). It was Buddha's third and final visit to Sri Lanka.

The temple is also famous for its image of the reclining Gautama Buddha and paintings by the native artist Solias Mendis which depict important events in the life of the Buddha, in the history of Buddhism in Sri Lanka, also incidents from the Jataka tales. It is the venue for the Duruthu Maha Perahera procession each January. An 5.5 m (18 ft) stone statue of the Bodhisattva Avalokitesvara has been erected at the temple.

== See also ==
- Kalyani Ordination Hall
