= Undaya =

2000 Sri Lankan film

Undaya උණ්ඩය
- Directed by: K. A. W. Perera
- Written by: K. A. W. Perera
- Produced by: K. A. W. Perera
- Starring: Sangeetha Weeraratne; Priyankara Perera; Sathischandra Edirisinghe
- Cinematography: J. J. Yogaraja
- Edited by: Elmo Halliday
- Music by: Shelton Premaratne
- Distributed by: CEL Theatres
- Release date: 4 February 2000
- Country: Sri Lanka
- Language: Sinhala

Undaya (The Bullet) (Sinhala: උණ්ඩය) is a 2000 Sri Lankan Sinhala drama thriller film directed and produced by K. A. W. Perera. It stars Sangeetha Weeraratne and Priyankara Perera in lead roles along with Sathischandra Edirisinghe and Channa Perera. Music composed by Shelton Premaratne. It is the 930th Sri Lankan film in the Sinhala cinema.

The film was previewed and allowed by the Public Performances Board (PPB) in July 1993, however had to wait until 2000 to release the film in theaters.

== Cast ==
- Sangeetha Weeraratne as Sarala Paliwardhana
- Sathischandra Edirisinghe as Ranil Seneviratne
- Priyankara Perera as Jayadeva 'Deva' Seneviratne
- Channa Perera as Murthi Paliwardhana
- Lionel Deraniyagala as Seram
- Rathna Sumanapala as Sarala's mother
- Edna Sugathapala as Beatrice 'Aunty'
- Nimal Wickramaarachchi as Manis 'Mama'
- Hyacinth Wijeratne as Deva's mother
- Lal Senadeera as Constable Silva
- Jayarathna Rupasinghe as Thief chasing constable
- Kapila Sigera as Ranil's henchman
