= Upali Ordination Hall =

Buddhist ordination hall in Myanmar

Upāli Ordination Hall
- ဥပါလိသိမ်
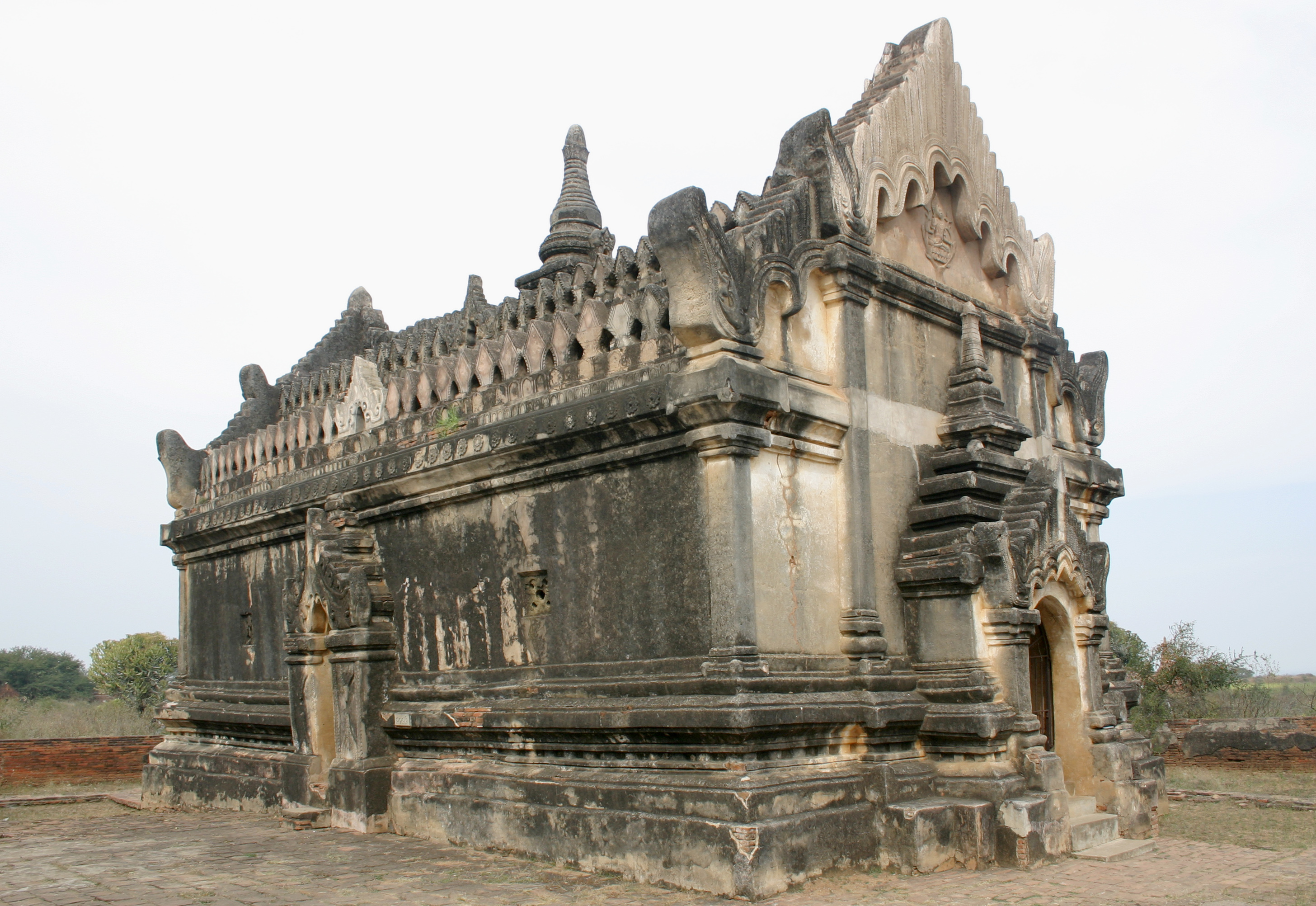

- Location within Myanmar

Religion
- Affiliation: Buddhism
- Sect: Theravada Buddhism
- Region: Mandalay Region

Location
- Municipality: Bagan
- Country: Myanmar
- Coordinates: 21.179674°N 94.876330°E

Architecture
- Founder: Anawrahta
- Completed: c. 1200s

Upāli Ordination Hall (Burmese: ဥပါလိသိမ်, Pali: Upāli Sīmā) is a Buddhist ordination hall located midway between Bagan and Nyaung U in Myanmar. The ordination hall is known for its well-preserved Konbaung Dynasty interior frescoes.

The ordination hall was built during the reign of King Anawrahta and was consecrated by four monks from Ceylon, led by Upāli Thera. The exterior was altered during the reign of Bodawpaya. The interior frescoes were begun on 4 March 1794 and were completed a year later. The highest tier depicts the 28 past Buddhas seated in the bhūmisparśa mudra, while the middle tier features scenes from the Jataka tales, and the lowest tier illustrates the rehabilitation of a Buddhist monk who has violated the Vinaya.
