= Karunasena Jayalath =

Sri Lankan journalist and novelist

- Born: 10 January 1928; Kumbuke, Horana
- Died: 25 August 1994 (aged 66)
- Education: Taxila Central College, Horana
- Occupation(s): newspaper editor, novelist, writer
- Known for: Golu Hadawatha

Karunasena Jayalath (10 January 1928 – 25 August 1994) was a Sri Lankan newspaper editor and novelist who is known for his works in Sinhala literature.

== Career ==
He joined a school in his village Kumbuke in 1933 and in 1944 he joined Taxila Central College, Horana where he completed his primary and secondary education. He joined the Lankadeepa newspaper agency as an editor and was promoted to deputy editor of the newspaper in 1961.

He also started writing novels after dropping out of the newspaper industry. He became popular with his first novel Golu Hadawatha which is about a romantic love story between two school-going students in a mixed school. The novel received critical reception and also won the State Literary Award for the best novel category. His novel Golu Hadawatha was also adopted as a film by veteran filmmaker Lester James Peiris in 1968 with the same title and the film was opened to positive reviews from critics and became a landmark film in Sri Lankan cinema. His other notable works include Muwa Dadayama, Bamba Ketu Heti, Gehenu Lamai, Lassana Ess and Ridee Nimnaya.
