= Solias Mendis =

Sri Lankan artist (1897–1975)

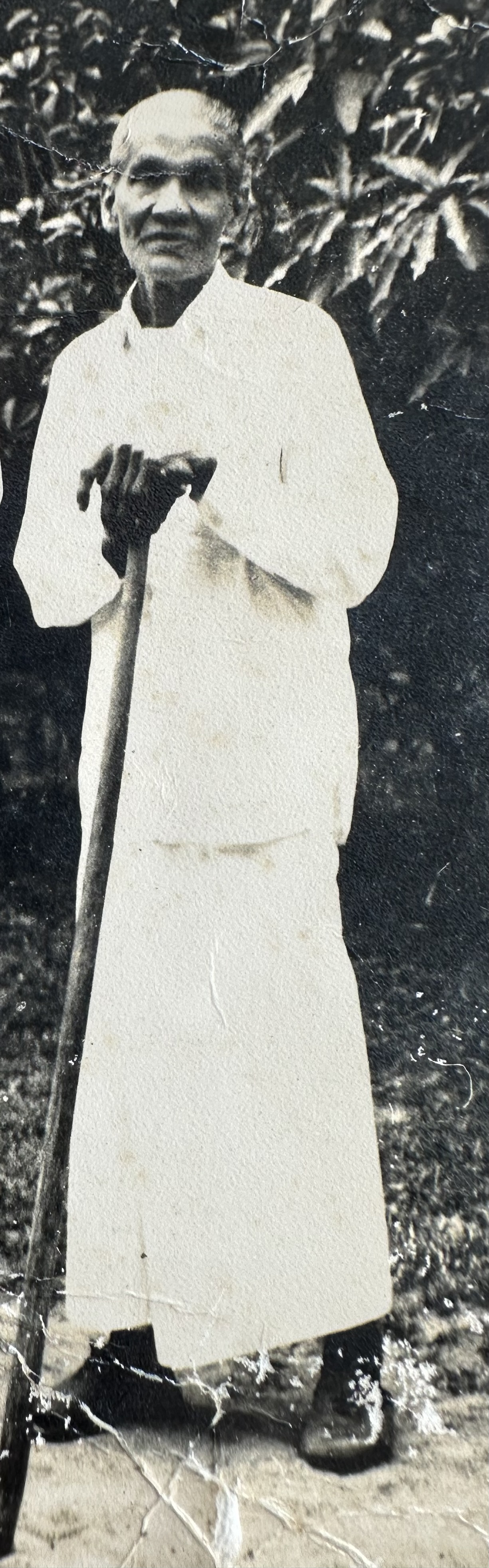
- Born: July 12, 1897; Madampe, Sri Lanka
- Died: October 1, 1975 (aged 78)
- Other name: Walimuni Solias Mendis
- Occupation: Artist
- Years active: 1925 to 1960

Walimuni Solias Mendis (June 17, 1897 – September 1, 1975) was a renowned Sri Lankan artist primarily known for his Buddhist temple paintings, accomplished in a neo-classical style.

A native of Mahawewa, Madampe in Sri Lanka, second of seven boys in the family, Mendis was intended by his parents to become an Ayurveda Physician, but he was drawn to art. In his early years, he worked and trained alongside his uncle Memonis Silva, himself a master painter. Once accomplished himself, he began painting murals in Buddhist temples. Later such as Rannasgalla Vihara and Maddepola Vihara.The Buddhist monks and devotees who saw his magnificent artistic talent decided to commission him to paint in Kelaniya Raja Maha Vihara. In order to increase his skills Mendis visited India to examine the works of Ajanta Caves, Ellora Caves, Bagh Caves and Sarnath, which inspired him to mingle the techniques of Indian Buddhist art with the traditions of Sinhalese classical art, eschewing the then prevalent European traditions. At around the age of 30, he undertook a twenty-year project to complete the Kelaniya Vihara murals. His style was unique, from graceful brush strokes to perspective.

== Gallery of Solias Mendis paintings at Kelaniya ==
Wall painting at Kelaniya Raja Maha Vihara, Painting by Solias Mendis
