= Ordination hall =

Type of Buddhist building

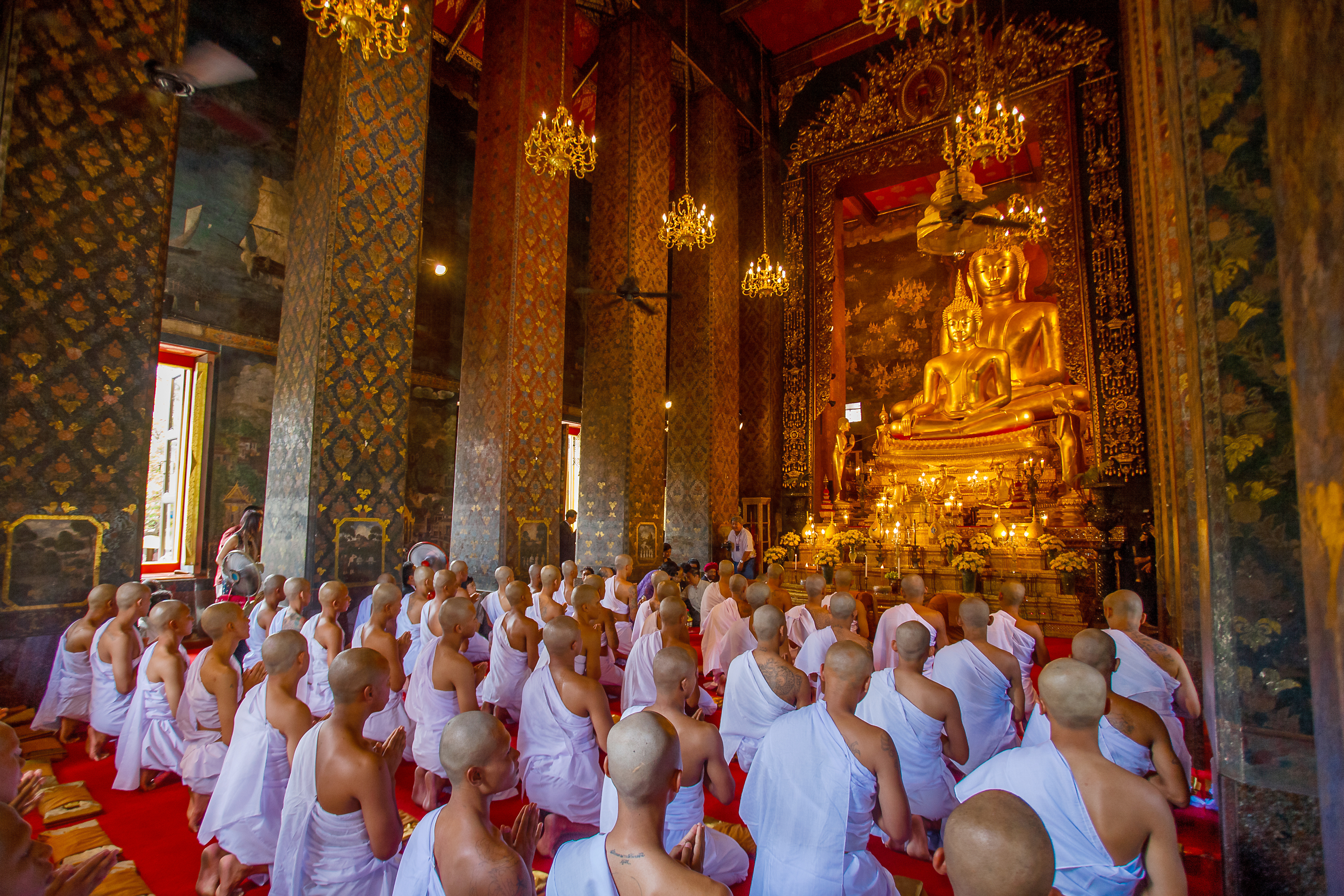
Ordination ceremony in the ordination hall of Wat Bowonniwet in Thailand

The ordination hall (Pali: sīmā) is a Buddhist building specifically consecrated and designated for the performance of the Buddhist ordination ritual (upasampadā) and other ritual ceremonies, such as the recitation of the Pāṭimokkha. The ordination hall is located within a boundary (sīmā) that defines "the space within which all members of a single local community have to assemble as a complete Sangha (samagga sangha) at a place appointed for ecclesiastical acts (kamma)." The constitution of the sīmā is regulated and defined by the Vinaya Piṭaka, along with its commentaries and sub-commentaries.

== Burmese ordination halls ==
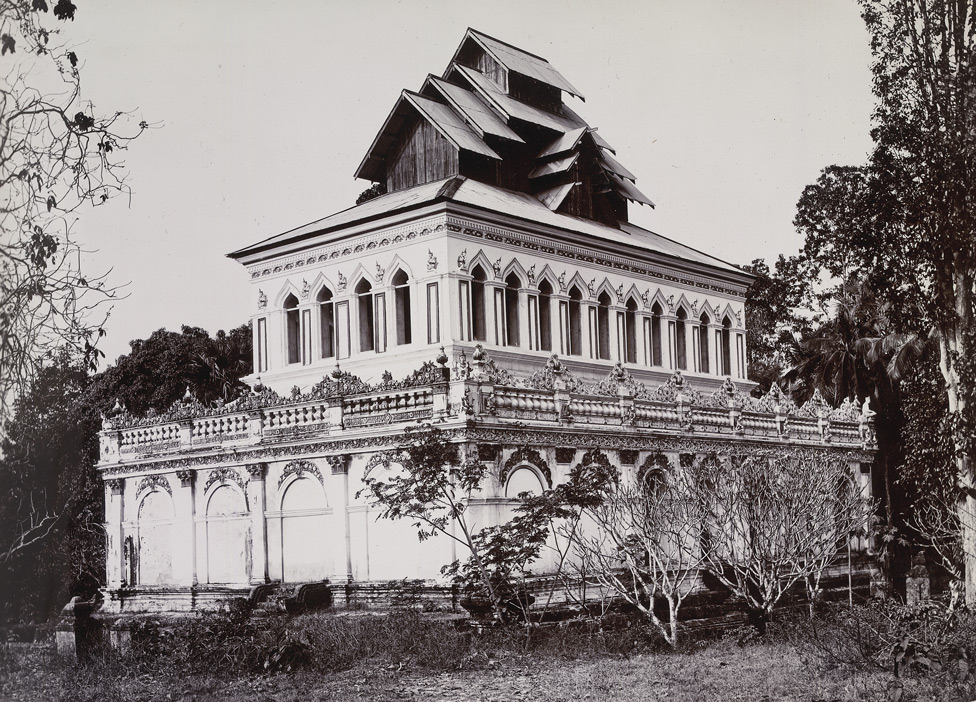
Kalyani Ordination Hall in Bago, Myanmar.

In Burmese, ordination halls are called thein (Burmese: သိမ်), derived from the Pali term sīmā, meaning "boundary". The thein is a common feature of Burmese monasteries (kyaung), although the thein may be not necessarily be located on the monastery compound itself. Shan ordination halls, called sim (သိမ်ႇ), are exclusively used for events limited to the monkhood.

The central importance of the ordination hall in the pre-colonial era is exemplified by the inclusion of an ordination hall, the Maha Pahtan Haw Shwe Ordination Hall (မဟာပဋ္ဌာန်းဟောရွှေသိမ်တော်ကြီး), as one of seven requisite edifices (နန်းတည်သတ္တဌာန) in the founding of Mandalay as a Burmese royal capital.

== Thai ordination halls ==
In Thailand, ordination halls are called ubosot (Thai: อุโบสถ, pronounced [ʔù.boː.sòt]) or bot (โบสถ์, [bòːt]), derived from the Pali term uposathāgāra, meaning a hall used for rituals on uposatha ("Buddhist sabbath") days. The ubosot is the focal point of Central Thai temples, whereas the focal point of Northern Thai temples is the stupa. In Northeastern Thailand (Isan), ordination halls are known as sim (สิม), as they are in Laos (Lao: ສິມ) and the Tai-Shan States of Myanmar(သိမ်ႇ). The ubosot, as the wat's principal building, is also used for communal services.

In the Thai tradition, the boundary of the ubosot is marked by eight boundary stones known as bai sema, which denote the sīmā. The oldest bai sema date to the Dvaravati period. The sema stones stand above and mark the luk nimit (ลูกนิมิต), stone spheres buried at the cardinal points of the compass delineating the sacred area. A ninth stone sphere, usually bigger, is buried below the main Buddha image of the ubosot. The entrance sides of most ubosot face east. While wihan buildings also similarly house Buddha images, they differ from ubosot in that wihan are not marked by sema stones. Across from the entrance door at the end of the interior is the ubosot's largest Buddha statue which is usually depicted in either the meditation attitude or the Maravijaya attitude.

== See also ==
- Upasampadā
- Vihāra
- Andaw-thein Temple
- Htukkanthein Temple
- Kalyani Ordination Hall
- Upali Ordination Hall
