= Shyama Ananda =

Sri Lankan actress

Shayama Ananda ශ්‍යාමා ආනන්ද
- Born: Shayama Ananda; 24 December 1959 (age 66); Colombo, Sri Lanka
- Education: Buddhist Ladies' College; St Bridget's Convent, Colombo; Visakha Vidyalaya
- Occupations: Actor, Producer
- Years active: 1961–1993
- Spouse: Saliya Perera (m. 1980)
- Children: 2
- Parents: M. S. Ananda (father); Violet Ananda (mother)

Shayama Ananda (Sinhala:ශ්‍යාමා ආනන්දන්), popularly known as Shayama Ananda, is a former actress in Sri Lankan Sinhala cinema.

== Personal life ==
Shayama was born on 24 December 1959 in Colombo as the elder daughter. Her father M. S. Ananda was a renowned cinematographer, director and producer. Her mother Violet Ananda was also a film producer. She started her education at the Buddhist Ladies' College Colombo and joined St Bridget's Convent, Colombo and finished her higher studies at Visakha Vidyalaya. Her father died on 26 June 2016 at the age of 83. Shayama has one younger sister.

She married Saliya Perera, Captain of the Thurstan College Cricket team on 15 December 1980. They have a daughter and a son

== Cinema career ==
She first appeared as a 6-month-old baby in the movie Vena Swargayak Kumatada, a Robin Tampoe production in 1960. Having entered the silver screen at a very young age, she did 'child' roles in Suwaneetha Lalini, Suhada Divi Piduma, Sithaka Mahima, Satha Panaha, Athulveema Thahanam, Senehasa, Penawa Neda and was known as Baby Shyama.

In 1969 her father launched their first production Pravesam Vanna and cast her in a dual role opposite Tony Ranasinghe, Malini Fonseka and Joe Abeywickrama in her first leading role. In 1969 she won the Lanka Deepa Deepasika award for best child artists in Sri Lankan Sinhala Cinema’s 25 years history for the portrayal of twin sisters in her father’s first home production Pravesam Venna, an MSA films release.

In 1975, Shayama acted in the first of the Shayama series in Mage Nangi Shayama with Roy de Silva, H. R. Jothipala and Sumana Amarasinghe directed by her father. In 1978 she appeared in dual roles in the movie Chandi Shyama which won the J.R. Jayawardena presidential award for one of the highest collections by a movie cinema since its beginning in 1948. She did a dual role in the film with Gamini Fonseka, which was her most commercially successful film. In the third of the Shyama series Hello Shayama (1982) she was cast as a dutiful daughter who competes with her father, Gamini Fonseka to do justice for her mother.

In the same year Gehenu Lamai directed by Sumitra Peries had Shayama played as "Padmini". The film was based on novel Gehenu Lamai written by Karunasena Jayalath. He praised her acting as the same as the character he had imagined while writing the book. Ananda was the O.C.I.C. award recipient for this role.

In 1994, she appeared with her daughter and son in the blockbuster film Mama Baya Ne Shayama directed by her father. The film was based on popular Hollywood film Home Alone.

== Filmography ==
| Year | Film | Roles | Ref. |
|---|---|---|---|
| 1961 | Suwaneetha Lalini | | |
| 1962 | Suhada Divi Piduma | | |
| 1963 | Deepashika | Child ("Kankanburu") | |
| 1963 | Vena Svargayak Kumatada | | |
| 1964 | Sithaka Mahima | | |
| 1965 | Satha Panaha | | |
| 1966 | Athulveema Thahanam | | |
| 1969 | Senehasa | | |
| 1969 | Pravesam Vanna | Shyama / Kanthi | |
| 1970 | Penawa Neda | | |
| 1970 | Priyanga | | |
| 1975 | Mage Nangi Shyama | Shyama | |
| 1978 | Chandi Shyama | Shyama / Kanthi | |
| 1978 | Gahanu Lamai | Padmini | |
| 1982 | Hello Shyama | Shyama | |
| 1994 | Mama Baya Ne Shyama | Shyama | |
