= Regi Siriwardena =

Sri Lankan writer, novelist and politician

Kala Keerthi Regi Siriwardena (15 May 1922 – 15 December 2004) was a Sri Lankan academic, journalist, poet, writer, playwright and writer of screenplays.

== Early life and education ==
Reginald Siriwardena (known as 'Reggie' until the 1980s) was born in the Colombo suburb of Ratmalana to Sinhalese Buddhist parents. His Macaulay-quoting father sent him for his schooling first to St. Thomas' College, Mount Lavinia, where he found the Anglican elite colonial atmosphere uncomfortable. In his poem Colonial Cameo, he remembers the day his mother, who spoke only Sinhala, took him to school and said "goodbye" in that tongue, to the amusement of his English-speaking classmates:

My mother pretended not to hear that insult.
The snobbish little bastards! But how can I blame
them? That day I was deeply ashamed of my mother.
Now, whenever I remember, I am ashamed of my shame.

– Regi Siriwardena, Colonial Cameo

He later went to Ananda College, where he felt rather more at home in an atmosphere that combined his father's Western classical erudition with the home-grown culture of his mother.

He was awarded a scholarship to University College, Colombo, and read English under E. F. C. Ludowyk and Doric de Souza, graduating with a University of London degree.

=== Student activism ===
While at university during the Second World War, he joined the Lanka Sama Samaja Party (LSSP). He became part of the underground leadership of the LSSP under the pseudonym 'Hamid' and attracted the attention of the British authorities as an anti-colonial activist. One of his tasks was arranging a safe house for Colvin R de Silva after the latter's escape from prison on 5 April 1942.

After the war, he became critical of the LSSP's evolution from its loose pre-war socialist ideology towards a more anti-Stalinist, orthodox Trotskyist stand, leaving it in 1946.

== Teaching & journalism career ==
After graduating he taught English at Ananda College and at Royal College, Colombo. A few years later, the former LSSP member Esmond Wickremesinghe, by then a Cold War conservative, recruited Siriwardena as a journalist on the Ceylon Daily News, part of the Lake House Group of Wickremesinghe's father-in-law, D. R. Wijewardena. Here he worked among fellow left or leftish intellectuals such as Herbert Keuneman, Bonny Fernando and Jeanne Hoban, who had been head-hunted by the shrewd Wickremasinghe.

In the early 1960s, the closeness of Lake House to the right-wing United National Party caused Siriwardena to leave journalism, the specific instance being a cartoon by Aubrey Collette showing Mrs. Sirimavo Bandaranaike and Dr. N.M. Perera together in a vulgar embrace, which he considered to be in poor taste. He then founded the English Department at a former Buddhist seat of higher learning, Vidyalankara University (now University of Kelaniya).

He worked with Lester James Peries on his ground-breaking Sinhala films, Gamperaliya and Golu Hadawatha. He was one of those who worked for the creation of a National Film Corporation for Sri Lanka, which was established in 1971.

In the mid 1970s, at the Curriculum Development Centre of the Ministry of Eductation, Siriwardena collaborated in the introduction of a controversial new English literature syllabus for the Advanced Level which, to the consternation of the conservatives, included the lyrics of Bob Dylan's Blowin' in the Wind, which replaced Shakespeare.

In the 1970s, Siriwardena became founder-secretary of the Civil Rights Movement of Sri Lanka, a non-governmental organisation for human rights.

In the 1980s, he was sought out by the liberal-left intelligentsia who founded the International Centre for Ethnic Studies (ICES) in Colombo, where he edited its journal.

In 1988, at a seminar organised by the British Council, Colombo Siriwardena debunked the reputation of TS Eliot, arguing that the technical mastery in his poetry concealed a poverty of experience and a narrow range of sympathies; that in his work creative powers are expanded on negative emotions of repulsion and disgust, springing from personal malaise (snobbery, misogyny and anti-Semitism); and that he was a great literary engineer rather than a great poet. This caused some ripples in the literary circles of Sri Lanka, which had idolised Eliot.

In 1995 Siriwardena won the Gratiaen Prize, the Sri Lankan literary award for the best writer in English.

In September 2004 he was conferred the Distinguished Service Award for his contribution to English letters at the State Literature Festival, which had to be accepted in absentia.

== Works ==
=== Poems ===
- Waiting for the Soldier (1989)
- To the Muse of Insomnia (1990)
- Poems and Selected Translations (1993)
- Octet: Collected Plays (1995)
- The Lost Lenore (1996)
- Among My Souvenirs (1997)
- Working Underground: The LSSP in Wartime (1999)
- The Pure Water of Poetry (1999)

=== Screenplays ===
- Gamperaliya (1965) (as Reggie Siriwardena)
- Golu Hadawatha (1969) (as Reggie Siriwardena)

=== Scholarly work ===
- M. A. de Silva & Reggie Siriwardena, Communication Policies in Sri Lanka: a Study, Paris: Unesco, 1977.
- Reggie Siriwardena, K. Indrapala, Sunil Bastian & Sepali Kottegoda, School Text Books and Communal Relations in Sri Lanka, Council for Communal Harmony Through the Media, Colombo. excerpts
- Reggie Siriwardena, Equality and the religious traditions of Asia, New York: St Martin's Press, 1987.
