= Anula Karunathilaka =

Sri Lankan actress

Anula Karunathilaka අනුලා කරුණාතිලක
- Born: Anula Karunathilaka; 23 January 1946 (age 80)
- Education: Wellawatta Girls School
- Occupation: Actress
- Years active: 1960–2010
- Known for: Dhammi in Golu Hadawatha
- Spouse: Daya Ranaweera

Anula Karunathilaka (Sinhala: අනුලා කරුණාතිලක, born 23 January 1946) is a Sri Lankan film actress and theatrical performer. Her work is noted during the 1970s film and cinema history in Sri Lanka. One of the most popular actresses in Sinhala cinema in the 1960s, she is best known for the popular role 'Dammi' in the blockbuster film Golu Hadawatha.

== Personal life ==
She was born on 23 January 1946 in Wellawatte, Colombo, Sri Lanka.

== Career ==
Karunathilaka's entry into the industry in the early 1960s came about as a result of a chance meeting with senior film industry figures at a beauty contest organized by the Dawasa newspaper in 1962. Having applied as a contestant at her sister's insistence, her photo was published in the newspaper among the other candidates' for the public to vote on. Filmmakers Sumitra Peries and Tissa Abeysekera were among the audience of the final event and, using the photo published in the newspaper, identified Karunathilaka during the day's proceedings. A week later, Sugathapala de Silva and G. W. Surendra visited the Karunathilakas' home with a message from Lester James Peries, Peries, and Abeysekera, inviting her to audition for the role of Nanda in Lester James' upcoming Gamperaliya. Despite her interest, Lester decided her to be too young for the part, and instead gave her the role of Liza, auditioning for the part in a scene alongside Gamini Fonseka. She thus made her on-screen debut at 16.

Karunathilika played a role in the local film industry's efforts to produce truly local performances, moving away from highly Indianized productions and plots.

== Acting style ==
Karunathilaka was an acclaimed popular and awarded actress. She is known for character acting. Her style is said to derive from her nurturing under a strict culture and family restrictions in the 1940s.

== Key performances ==
Golu Hadawatha made many notable contributions to Sinhala cinema, and became one of the most popular actresses in the late 1960s. Her most important role was as Dhammi in Golu Hadawatha (Silent Heart). Karunathilka was awarded with national Sarasaviya Awards in 1969 for the role. Another key role was Sugath.

== Personal life ==
Karunathilaka was married to photographer and journalist Daya Ranaweera.

== Awards ==
- 1965 - Sarasaviya Award - Popular Actress
- 1969 - Sarasaviya Award - Best Actress - Golu Hadawatha
- 2011 - UV Sumathipala Memorial Award

== Selected works ==
=== Filmography ===
| Year | Film | Role | Ref. |
|---|---|---|---|
| 1963 | Gamperaliya | Laissa | |
| 1965 | Chandiya | Sumana | |
| 1965 | Sonduru Yuwala | | |
| 1966 | Seethala Wathura | | |
| 1966 | Parasathu Mal | Nona | |
| 1967 | Daru Duka | Sumana | |
| 1967 | Ran Salu | Sarojini 'Sara' | |
| 1967 | Sadol Kandulu | | |
| 1967 | Vasanthi | | |
| 1968 | Punchi Baba | Caretaker | |
| 1968 | Golu Hadawatha | Damayanthi 'Dammi' | |
| 1969 | Oba Nathnam | | |
| 1969 | Narilatha | Soma Weerasooriya | |
| 1969 | Mee Masso | | |
| 1969 | Paara Walalu | | |
| 1969 | Mokada Une | Lucy | |
| 1969 | Bakmaha Deege | Pabilina | |
| 1970 | Penawa Neda | | |
| 1972 | Ihatha Athmaya | Priyani | |
| 1976 | Nedeyo | Nirmala Gunaratne | |
| 1977 | Yakadaya | Rathi | |
| 1995 | Demodara Palama | Sumana | |
| 2004 | Randiya Dahara | Samantha's mother | |
| 2010 | Tikiri Suwanda | Samanmalee's mother | |
| 2017 | Wassanaye Sanda | Mihiri's mother | |
| 2019 | Rush | Mrs. Saparamadu | |

=== Television ===
- Aba Yaluwo
- Ammawarune
- Bhavathra
- Ganga Addara
- Hirusanda Maima
- Laabai Apple
- Mahathala Hatana
- Rosa Katu
- Sayaweni Patumaga
- Senehase Nimnaya
- Sepalika
- Sith Bindi Rekha
- Tharuka

=== Theater ===
- Boarding Karayo
- Ranthodu
