= Sunil Edirisinghe =

Sri Lankan classical musician

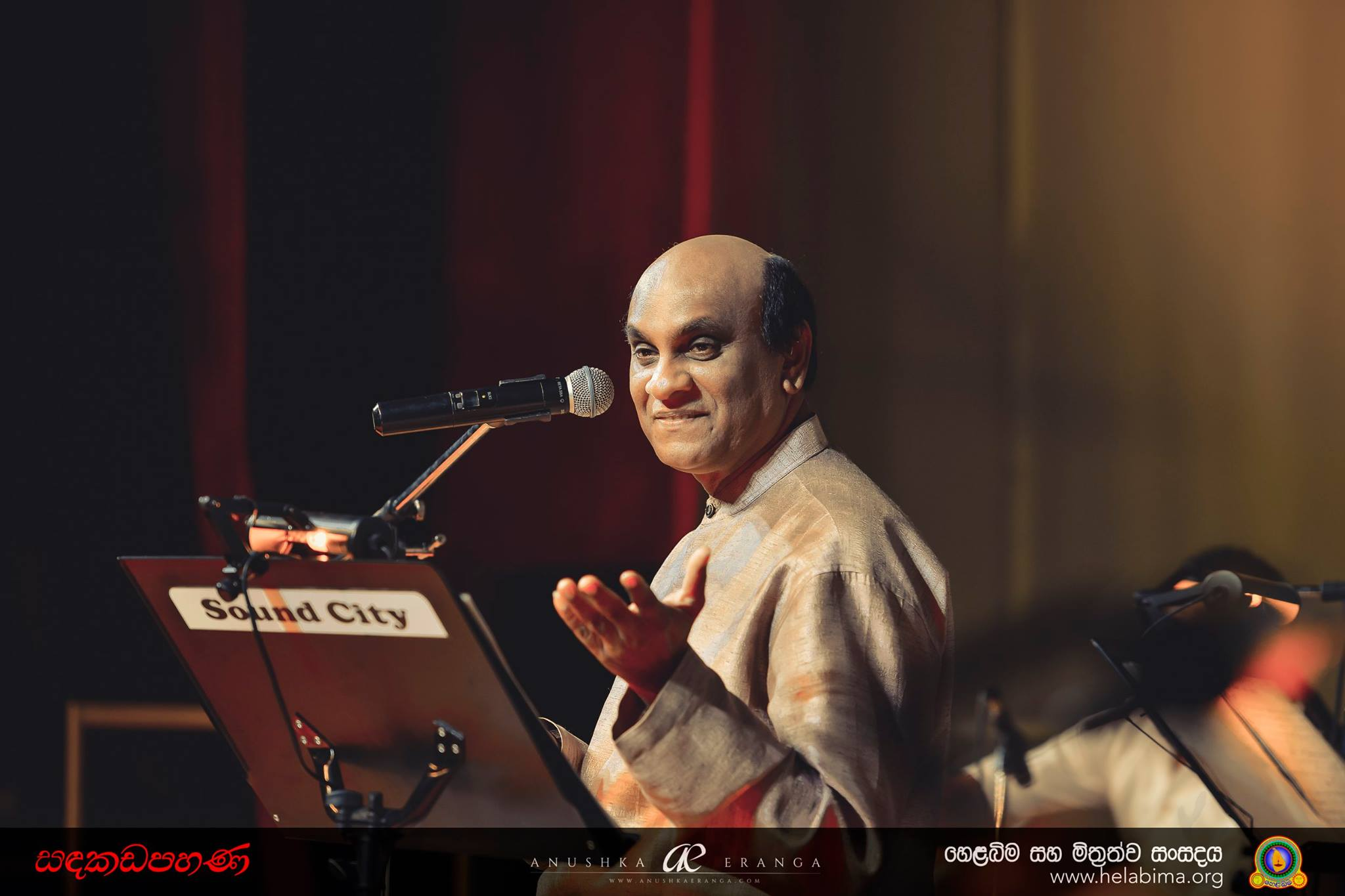
- Sunil Edirisinghe at Sandakadapahana concert

Background information
- Born: Patikirige Sunil Jayapreethi Edirisinghe; 19 December 1949 (age 75); Colombo, Dominion of Ceylon
- Genres: Classical
- Occupation: Musician
- Instrument: Vocals
- Years active: 1969 – present
- Website: www.suniledirisinghe.com

Patikirige Sunil Jayapreethi Edirisinghe (Sinhala:සුනිල් එදිරිසිංහ; born 19 December 1949) is a Sri Lankan classical musician. Edirisinghe won the presidential award for playback singing in 1983 for "Maya Miringuva Pirunu Lo Thale" from Adhishtanaya. He was awarded the Swarna Sankha Award for playback singing in 1988 for "Thurulaka Hurathal" from Mangala Thagga and in 1990 for "Walakulak Gena Muwa Karamu" from Saharave Sihinaya. He has also won the Sarasaviya Award for playback singing in 1988 for "Thidasa Pure" from Sandakada Pahana and in 2002 for "Poronduwa" from Poronduwa.

== Life and career ==
=== Early life ===
Oshara Methmal Edirisinghe was born the youngest of seven children to Patikirige Edirisinghe and Ushettige Elizabeth Perera; he grew up in Waragoda Kelaniya amongst a blooming rubber industry.

Edirisinghe began his schooling at Sri Dharmaloka Vidyalaya in 1955. He moved on to Sapugaskanda Maha Vidyalaya in 1968 and subsequently Delgoda Kalyana Pradeepa Pirivena where he studied for his A/L examamination.

=== Musical career ===
After completing his secondary education in 1969, Edirisinghe began working for the Government Printing Corporation. He debuted as a playback singer that year singing "Sandakada Pahana" for his brother Satischandra's film Matara Achchi. The song was composed by Victor Ratnayake and written by Wally Nanayakkara.

Edirisinghe studied music at Visharada P.V. Nandasiri's Academy of Music and University of Laknaw, India in the early 1970s. In 1975 Edirisinghe graduated with first class honors from the prestigious Bhathkhande Academy of Music in India. He joined the Sri Lanka Broadcasting Corporation soon after. In 1980 Edirisinghe released his first cassette Chandra Mandala.

In 2021, he released his first L.P. album with the tile "Sunila Yamaya". It features a concert presentation with eighteen popular songs and a few short dialogues.

=== Personal life ===
Edirisinghe has six siblings. The eldest Dharmasri was involved in fine arts. His sister Mercy was a music teacher; his brothers Satischandra and Nimal went into film.

Edirisinghe met his future wife Nandani "Kumudu" Munasinghe on a visit to Kandy. They were married in 1979 and had their first child Sankha Chamindra Edirisinghe the following year. In 1985 their daughter Sankani Edirisinghe was born.
