= List of accolades received by Kaththi =

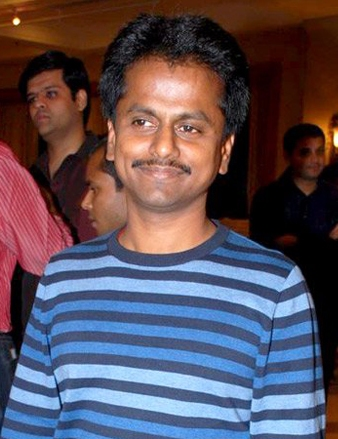
- AR Murugadoss (pictured in 2012) received several awards and nominations for writing and directing the film.
Accolades
Award	Won	Nominated
Ananda Vikatan Cinema Awards	1	1
Edison Awards	3	3
Filmfare Awards South	3	8
IIFA Utsavam	1	3
Norway Tamil Film Festival Awards	0	1
South Indian International Movie Awards	4	7
Vijay Awards	2	10
- Total number of awards and nominations (Note: Awards in certain categories do not have prior nominations and only winners are announced by the jury. For simplification and to avoid errors, each award in this list has been presumed to have had a prior nomination.)
Totals	14	33
- References

Kaththi (transl. Knife) is a 2014 Indian Tamil-language action film written and directed by AR Murugadoss. The film stars Vijay and Samantha Ruth Prabhu while Sathish, Neil Nitin Mukesh and Tota Roy Chowdhury play supporting roles. The film focuses on the attempts made by a petty thief Kathiresan (Vijay), the look-alike of a jailed hydrology graduate Jeevanandham (Vijay), to lead a rebellion by farmers from the latter's village, Thanoothu. Kathiresan helps them fight against Chirag (Mukesh), the owner of a soft drink company who has exploited Thanoothu's water resources for his own profit. Produced by Allirajah Subaskaran and K. Karunamoorthy under their production company Lyca Productions, the soundtrack and score were composed by Anirudh Ravichander. George C. Williams and A. Sreekar Prasad were in charge of the cinematography and editing respectively.

Produced on a budget of ₹700 million, (Note: The average exchange rate in 2014 was 63.469 Indian rupees (₹) per 1 US dollar (US$).) Kaththi was released on 22 October 2014 to critical acclaim. It was commercially successful, grossing ₹1.3 billion worldwide. The film won 14 awards from 33 nominations; its direction, story, screenplay, performances of the cast members, music, choreography and stunt direction have received the most attention from award groups.

At the 62nd Filmfare Awards South, Kaththi was nominated in eight categories, including Best Actor (Vijay), Best Actress (Samantha) and Best Music Director (Ravichander); it won for Best Film (Subaskaran and Karunamoorthy), Best Director (Murugadoss) and Best Dance Choreographer (Shobi Paulraj). The film received ten nominations at the 9th Vijay Awards, and won two, Favourite Film and Favourite Director. It garnered seven nominations at the 4th South Indian International Movie Awards ceremony and won four awards, including Best Film, Best Actor in a Negative Role for Mukesh, Best Fight Choreographer for Anal Arasu and Best Dance Choreographer for Shobi. Kaththi won the Best Music Director for Ravichander at the 1st IIFA Utsavam while also being nominated for Best Director and Best Female Playback Singer (Sunidhi Chauhan). Among other wins, the film received three Edison Awards and one Ananda Vikatan Cinema Awards. It also received a nomination for Best Social Awareness at the Norway Tamil Film Festival Awards, but it lost to Sigaram Thodu (2014).

== Awards and nominations ==
Award	Date of ceremony (Note: Date is linked to the article about the awards held that year, wherever possible.)	Category	Recipient(s) and nominee(s)	Result	Ref(s)
Ananda Vikatan Cinema Awards	8 January 2015	Best Choreographer	Shobi Paulraj for "Pakkam Vanthu"	Won	
Edison Awards	15 February 2015	Best Music Director	Anirudh Ravichander	Won	
Edison Awards	15 February 2015	Best Comedian	Sathish	Won	
Edison Awards	15 February 2015	Best Choreographer	Shobi Paulraj for "Pakkam Vanthu"	Won	
Filmfare Awards South	26 June 2015	Best Film – Tamil	Allirajah Subaskaran, K. Karunamoorthy	Won	
Filmfare Awards South	26 June 2015	Best Director – Tamil	AR Murugadoss	Won	
Filmfare Awards South	26 June 2015	Best Actor – Tamil	Vijay	Nominated	
Filmfare Awards South	26 June 2015	Best Actress – Tamil	Samantha Ruth Prabhu	Nominated	
Filmfare Awards South	26 June 2015	Best Music Director – Tamil	Anirudh Ravichander	Nominated	
Filmfare Awards South	26 June 2015	Best Lyricist – Tamil	Madhan Karky for "Selfie Pulla"	Nominated	
Filmfare Awards South	26 June 2015	Best Male Playback Singer – Tamil	Vijay for "Selfie Pulla"	Nominated	
Filmfare Awards South	26 June 2015	Best Choreography	Shobi Paulraj	Won	
IIFA Utsavam	24–25 January 2016	Best Direction – Tamil	AR Murugadoss	Nominated	
IIFA Utsavam	24–25 January 2016	Best Music Direction – Tamil	Anirudh Ravichander	Won	
IIFA Utsavam	24–25 January 2016	Best Female Playback Singer – Tamil	Sunidhi Chauhan for "Selfie Pulla"	Nominated	
Norway Tamil Film Festival Awards	23–26 April 2015	Best Social Awareness Award	Allirajah Subaskaran, K. Karunamoorthy	Nominated	
South Indian International Movie Awards	6–7 August 2015	Best Film – Tamil	Allirajah Subaskaran, K. Karunamoorthy	Won	
South Indian International Movie Awards	6–7 August 2015	Best Director – Tamil	AR Murugadoss	Nominated	
South Indian International Movie Awards	6–7 August 2015	Best Actor – Tamil	Vijay	Nominated	
South Indian International Movie Awards	6–7 August 2015	Best Actress – Tamil	Samantha Ruth Prabhu	Nominated	
South Indian International Movie Awards	6–7 August 2015	Best Actor in a Negative Role – Tamil	Neil Nitin Mukesh	Won	
South Indian International Movie Awards	6–7 August 2015	Best Fight Choreographer – Tamil	Anal Arasu	Won	
South Indian International Movie Awards	6–7 August 2015	Best Dance Choreographer – Tamil	Shobi Paulraj for "Pakkam Vanthu"	Won	
Vijay Awards	25 April 2015	Best Actor	Vijay	Nominated	
Vijay Awards	25 April 2015	Best Stunt Director	Anal Arasu	Nominated	
Vijay Awards	25 April 2015	Best Story, Screenplay Writer	AR Murugadoss	Nominated	
Vijay Awards	25 April 2015	Best Costume Designer	Deepali Noor	Nominated	
Vijay Awards	25 April 2015	Best Male Playback Singer	Vishal Dadlani for "Aathi"	Nominated	
Vijay Awards	25 April 2015	Favourite Film	Allirajah Subaskaran, K. Karunamoorthy	Won	
Vijay Awards	25 April 2015	Favourite Director	AR Murugadoss	Won	
Vijay Awards	25 April 2015	Favourite Hero	Vijay	Nominated	
Vijay Awards	25 April 2015	Favourite Heroine	Samantha Ruth Prabhu	Nominated	
Vijay Awards	25 April 2015	Favourite Song	"Selfie Pulla"	Nominated	

== See also ==
- List of Tamil films of 2014
