= Rani (2025 film) =

2025 Sri Lankan film

- Sinhala: රාණි
- Directed by: Asoka Handagama
- Written by: Asoka Handagama
- Based on: real incidents
- Produced by: Subaskaran Allirajah
- Starring: Swarna Mallawarachchi; Rehan Amaratunga; Sanath Gunathilake; Sajitha Anthony; Bimal Jayakody; Ashan Dias; Mayura Kanchana; Rithika Kodithuvakku King Ratnam
- Cinematography: Channa Deshapriya
- Edited by: Ravindra Guruge
- Music by: Dr. Rohana Weerasinghe
- Production company: Lyca Productions
- Distributed by: EAP Theatres
- Release date: 30 January 2025
- Language: Sinhala
- Box office: LKR 250 Million (Worldwide)

Rani (Sinhala: රාණි) is a 2025 Sri Lankan Sinhalese biographical drama thriller film directed by Asoka Handagama and produced by Subaskaran Allirajah for Lyca Productions. Rani is the debut production of Lyca Productions Lanka and the first film released by the company in the Sri Lankan cinema industry. It stars Swarna Mallawarachchi in the lead titular role along with Rehan Amaratunga, Sanath Gunathilake, Sajitha Anthony, Bimal Jayakody, Ashan Dias, Mayura Kanchana and Rithika Kodithuvakku appeared in supporting roles. The film is based on the life story of Richard de Zoysa, a journalist, writer, human rights activist and actor, who was abducted and killed on February 18, 1990. After the abduction, his mother doctor Manorani Saravanamuttu made a challenging journey, seeking justice for her son's death.

Rani released on 30 January 2025 in theaters to positive reviews from critics. praised for its soundtrack, cinematography and performance of Swarna Mallawarachchi and the cast.

As of 15 March 2025, the production company confirmed that the film had grossed LKR 250 million (Worldwide), making it one of the highest-grossing films in 2025 and in Sri Lankan cinema history.

== Plot ==
The film follows Dr. Manorani Saravanamuttu's relentless pursuit of justice after the tragic abduction and murder of her son, Richard de Zoysa, a journalist, writer, and human rights activist, in 1990. It vividly depicts the atrocities that occurred in Sri Lanka during the 1987–1989 JVP insurrection

== Cast ==
- Swarna Mallawarachchi as Manorani Saravanamuttu
- Sanath Gunathilake as Lalith Athulathmudali
- Mayura Kanchana as Karu
- Rehan Amaratunga as Richard de Zoysa
- Sajitha Anthony as Gayan
- Priyantha Lalith as President Ranasinghe Premadasa
- Bimal Jayakody as Mahinda Rajapaksa
- Ashan Dias as Mangala Samaraweera
- Saumya Liyanage as Manorani's relative
- Gihan Fernando as Manorani's relative
- Sampath Jayaweera as Manorani's relative
- Anasuya Subasinghe as Manorani's relative
- King Ratnam as Ronnie Gunasinghe
- Anuradha Mallawarachchi as Ronnie's henchman
- Rithika Kodithuwakku as killed musician's pregnant wife
- Nalin Lucena as Ronnie's henchman
- Samantha Paranaliyanage as Ronnie's henchman
- Jude Clodius as Ronnie's henchman
- Stefan Thirimanna
- Roshan Polwattage
- Suranga Perera as killed musician
- Manoj Jayakodi
- Upul Weerasekera
- Ajith Samantha

== Production ==
This is the 11th feature film directed by award-winning filmmaker Asoka Handagama. Before the film, he collaboratively directed the film Ae, Ohu, Aneka along with Prasanna Vithanage and Vimukthi Jayasundara, where Handagama made "Aneka". He also made the screenplay, song lyrics as well as dialogues along with Udan Fernando for the film. The film is produced by Subaskaran Allirajah for Lyca Productions, who produced renowned Kollywood films such as Kaththi, Ponniyin Selvan: I and Ponniyin Selvan: II.

Production head is Janaki Wijeratne, Line production by Iranthi Abeysinghe and executive production by Trilan Shasti Ganesan and Naomi Apsara. Production support given by Uditha Kahandavarachchi and Dhananjaya Basnagoda where production management handled by Manjula Perera Withanage. The assistant directing team was led by Vathees Varunan as the First Assistant Director, with Niroshan Edirimanna and Prasanna Wijesinghe serving as the Second and Third Assistant Directors. Channa Deshapriya is the cinematographer with the held of Dilanga Dinushan, Rajitha Hettiarachi, Thilina Prasad and Ravindra Guruge is the editor with the help of Mahesh Sanjeeva. Sound design by Aruna Priyantha Kaluarachchi, Makeup and hair styling by Priyantha Dissanayake, whereas color combination by Dinindu Jagoda, costume design by Piyatissa Akuranboda and lighting co-handled by Ariyaratne Perera, Hiran Indika, Kosala Manoj, Keerthi Wasantha, Gayan Buddhika, Rohan Devinda, Kanishka Mandara and Saman Kumara.

Art direction and production design done by Bimal Dushmantha and still photography done by Chamara Nuvantha. Visual effects are supervised by Chathra Weeraman with the support of Nuwan Gunaratne and co-designed by Nuwan Gunaratne and Ashan Amarasinghe. Buddhini Jayawardena, Akalanka Rathnayake, Uditha Kahandavarachchi and Upamali Nuwarapaksha co-handled the production coordination. Award-winning musician Rohana Weerasinghe is the music director, where Nipuni Sharadha, Stefan Thirimanna and Sadani Wijetunga made background vocals.

In the production of Rani, Rusiru Pannilage was responsible for the creation of the "රාණි" artwork for the film, the design of the film trailer, and the production of the AI-generated music video for the film’s soundtrack. His innovative use of artificial intelligence in combining visual and audio elements added a unique dimension to the film, showcasing his expertise in both creative and technological fields.

== Music ==
The soundtrack composed by Rohana Weerasinghe who also composed the Background Score.

No.	Title	Singer(s)	Lyrics	Length
1.	Puthune Nidanna	Nipuni Sharada Pathirage	Ashoka Handagama	3:50

== Release ==
The film Rani was initially scheduled for release on January 23. However, due to the nationwide premiere of the film Kaasi Vaasi on the same day, the release of Rani was postponed to January 30 at the request of the Kaasi Vaasi film team. This decision was made by Janaki Wijerathna, the Vice Chairperson of Lyca Productions Lanka.
