= Khaidi No. 150 =

2017 Indian film by V. V. Vinayak

- Theatrical release poster
- Directed by: V. V. Vinayak
- Screenplay by: V. V. Vinayak
- Dialogue by: Sai Madhav Burra
- Based on: Kaththi by A. R. Murugadoss
- Produced by: Ram Charan; Allirajah Subaskaran
- Starring: Chiranjeevi; Kajal Aggarwal
- Cinematography: R. Rathnavelu
- Edited by: Gautham Raju
- Music by: Devi Sri Prasad
- Production companies: Lyca Productions; Konidela Production Company
- Distributed by: Lyca Productions
- Release date: 11 January 2017 (India)
- Running time: 141 minutes
- Country: India
- Language: Telugu
- Budget: ₹50 crore
- Box office: ₹164 crore

Khaidi No. 150 (transl. Prisoner No. 150) is a 2017 Indian Telugu-language action comedy film directed by V. V. Vinayak and produced by Lyca Productions and Konidela Production Company. The film starred Chiranjeevi in a dual role and Kajal Aggarwal. It marks Chiranjeevi's return to films in a lead role after nearly a decade, and also his 150th film. The film is a remake of the 2014 Tamil film Kaththi.

Produced on a budget of ₹50 crore, principal photography for Khaidi No. 150 began in June 2016 in Hyderabad. The film was released on 11 January 2017, coinciding with the Sankranthi festival. At the time of its release, Khaidi No. 150 became the fourth highest-grossing Telugu film, earning over ₹164 crore worldwide.

== Plot ==
In Kolkata, an arrested petty criminal Kaththi Seenu helps the police capture an escaping prisoner, only to escape himself afterward. He flees to Hyderabad, planning to go to Bangkok. However, he changes his mind after encountering Subbalakshmi, his childhood friend, who deceives him into thinking she reciprocates his feelings.

Seenu and his assistant Malli witness Seenu's doppelgänger, Shankar, being attacked by thugs. They admit Shankar to a hospital, and Seenu decides to impersonate him to evade the police. Under Shankar's identity, Seenu and Malli move into an old-age home run by Shankar, planning to steal ₹25 lakh, intended for the home's residents, to fund their Bangkok trip. However, Seenu soon learns about Shankar's mission.

Past: Shankar is a hydrology post-graduate from Neeruru village in Rayalaseema. He discovered groundwater that could irrigate the village and surrounding areas. However, an MNC owned by Aggarwal tricked the villagers into giving up their land for a factory. Shankar was arrested, and six villagers committed suicide to draw media attention and secure his release.

Present: Learning of Shankar's plight, Seenu decides to fight for the villagers' cause while still impersonating Shankar. Seenu, the old-age home residents, and Seenu's supporters approach the jury to advocate for their cause. Seenu intimidates a bribed jury member into siding with them. He also sends a disguised ally to mark Aggarwal's neck with a fingerprint. Aggarwal retaliates by sending 50 men to kill Seenu, but Seenu defeats them with coins given by the Lion Club during a ceremony.

Meanwhile, the real Shankar regains consciousness in the Kolkata prison where Seenu was held. With the help of a prisoner Seenu had previously captured, Shankar escapes and heads to Hyderabad with the prisoner's henchmen, unaware of Seenu's efforts there.

Seenu tries to raise media awareness about the villagers' plight, but the media dismisses it as non-sensational news. At the high court, the judge rules in favor of Seenu and the villagers but stipulates that villagers working abroad must refute Aggarwal's false support claims within five days. Unable to bring the villagers back in time, Seenu takes drastic measures to draw attention to their cause.

Seenu, Subbalakshmi, Malli, and the old-age home residents block Hyderabad's water supply by sitting on the pipelines. The resulting water crisis gains national attention, and Seenu emerges to give an emotionally charged speech that moves the nation.

Meanwhile, Shankar arrives in Hyderabad but is captured by Aggarwal's henchmen. He watches Seenu's speech on television and is moved by Seenu's efforts to help the villagers. On the eve of the verdict, Seenu's impersonation is exposed, but he assures the residents of his genuine commitment to their cause and promises to rescue Shankar from Aggarwal.

Seenu infiltrates Aggarwal's office, rescues Shankar, and they confront Aggarwal together. Shankar kills Aggarwal as he is about to kill Seenu. The next day, the court rules in favor of Shankar and the villagers. The Kolkata police arrest Seenu, but he assures Subbalakshmi that he will return soon.

== Cast ==
- Chiranjeevi in a dual role as
  - Kaththi Seenu
  - Konidela Siva Shankaravaraprasad
- Kajal Aggarwal as Lakshmi
- Tarun Arora as Agarwal
- Brahmanandam as Dober Man
- Ali as Malli, Seenu's friend
- Posani Krishna Murali as Borabanda Bujji
- Prudhviraj as Minister Shekar
- Nassar as Vijayakanth, Lions Club Speaker
- Nagendra Babu as Judge Suryaprasad
- Jaya Prakash Reddy as Commissioner Krishnamurthy
- Raghu Karumanchi as Ward Corporator Chinna, Borabanda Bujji's brother
- Raghu Babu as Raghu, a cook in the old age home
- Sarika Ramachandra Rao as Rangaraj, a police officer
- Paruchuri Venkateswara Rao as Lawyer Venkatachalam
- Chandra Mohan as Chandram
- Narsing Yadav as Baasha Bhai
- Fish Venkat as Borabanda Bujji's gang member
- Mahadevan as old man
- V. V. Vinayak – Special appearance as water taking graduate
- Lakshmi Rai as an item number "Ratthaalu"
- Ram Charan – Special appearance in the song "Ammadu Let's Do Kummudu"
- Devi Sri Prasad – Special appearance in the song "Ammadu Let's Do Kummudu"

== Production ==
=== Development ===
Chiranjeevi's 150th full-length feature film began filming in April 2016. The film is the remake of 2014 Tamil film, Kaththi, featuring Vijay and Samantha Ruth Prabhu which dealt with issues such as farmer suicides and water scarcity in India. The film was financed by Chiranjeevi's son Ram Charan and producer A. Subashkaran and V. V. Vinayak directed Chiranjeevi for the second time. The Paruchuri Brothers wrote the script based on A.R. Murugadoss' original story. Devi Sri Prasad composed music for the film.

=== Casting ===
The film features Chiranjeevi and Kajal Aggarwal was finalised as the heroine in late July 2016. Tarun Arora was selected as the antagonist for the film.

=== Filming ===
Principal photography commenced on 23 June 2016 as key sequences being shot at Chanchalguda Central Jail in Hyderabad. Later, in August 2016 Chiranjeevi and Kajal joined the shooting at Rajiv Gandhi International Airport, Hyderabad. A special song was shot with Raai Laxmi and Chiranjeevi in October 2016. In November, two songs were shot with the lead pair Chiranjeevi and Kajal in Europe. Raghava Lawrence, Jani Master and Sekhar choreographed the dances. Kanal Kannan and the duo Ram Lakshman choreographed the fights. The visual effects for the film were made by Red Chillies VFX, a subsidiary of Red Chillies Entertainment.

== Soundtrack ==
The soundtrack album and background score were composed by Devi Sri Prasad. The soundtrack album consists of five tracks.

Tracklist
No.	Title	Lyrics	Singer(s)	Length
1.	"Ammadu Let's Do Kummudu"	Devi Sri Prasad	Devi Sri Prasad, Ranina Reddy	3:28
2.	"Sundari"	Sri Mani	Jaspreet Jasz	4:30
3.	"You And Me"	Sri Mani	Hariharan, Shreya Ghoshal	4:57
4.	"Ratthalu"	Devi Sri Prasad	Nakash Aziz, Jasmine Sandlas	4:22
5.	"Neeru Neeru"	Ramajogayya Sastry	Shankar Mahadevan	3:37
Total length:				19:06

== Reception ==
=== Box office ===
Khaidi No. 150 grossed ₹50.45 crore on the opening day. KN150 crossed the ₹95.4 crore mark in 2 days. It grossed over $2.45 million in the USA. As of February 2017 the film has grossed ₹164 crore.

=== Critical response ===
The Times of India gave the film 3 out of 5 writing "Yes, Chiranjeevi is back for sure, although we can’t quite say he’s back with a bang." 123 Telugu gave the film 3.25 writing "On the whole, Khaidi No 150 is a typical mass entertainer. The film is set to take record openings and has everything that we expect from a star hero like Chiranjeevi. He makes a thumping comeback and proves that even at this age he can give every star hero a run for their money. If you ignore the predictable story line and dull climax, Chiru’s one man show, superb songs, and a good message makes this film a good watch this festival season." The Indian Express gave the film 3.5 writing "DSP songs do pump up the narrative but a slight disappointment is that dancer Chiru of Indra and Tagore is quite not in shape for a new step. There is modified Veena step and a “buckle lift” step with his son, Ram Charan Teja, who makes a 30-second cameo in a song, but the same agility and lithe is missing."

Great Andhra gave the film three out of five writing "Over all, "Khaidi No 150" is a film that has some nice mass moments and has dealt on a topical issue with cliched script. It is Chiru's act that works rather than the content of the movie." Firstpost gave the film three out of five writing "Directed by VV Vinayak, Khaidi No 150's objective, in the end, isn't to really tell an emotional story. It's to announce the return of the Megastar. And it serves its purpose. The story is just bonus. Nothing else matters."

== Awards and nominations ==
Year	Awards	Category	Recipient	Result
2017	49th Cinegoers Awards	Best Hero	Chiranjeevi	Won
2017	49th Cinegoers Awards	Best Choreography	Sekhar	Won
2017	16th Santosham Film Awards	Best Actor	Chiranjeevi	Won
2017	16th Santosham Film Awards	Best Choreography	Sekhar	Won
2017	16th Santosham Film Awards	Best Stunts/ Action	Ram-Lakshman	Won
2017	7th South Indian International Movie Awards	Best Actor in a Negative Role (Telugu)	Tarun Arora	Nominated
2017	7th South Indian International Movie Awards	Best Music Director (Telugu)	Devi Sri Prasad	Nominated
2017	7th South Indian International Movie Awards	Best Male Playback Singer (Telugu)	Devi Sri Prasad for "Ammadu Lets Do Kummudu"	Nominated
2017	65th Filmfare Awards South	Best Actor	Chiranjeevi	Nominated
2017	65th Filmfare Awards South	Best Music Director	Devi Sri Prasad	Nominated
2017	65th Filmfare Awards South	Best Choreography	Sekhar for "Ammadu Lets Do Kummudu"	Won
2017	Zee Golden Awards	Best Music Director	Devi Sri Prasad	Won
