= Vijay Award for Favourite Film =

Award category

The Vijay Award for Favourite film is given by STAR Vijay as part of its annual Vijay Awards ceremony for Tamil (Kollywood) films. In the inaugural year of the awards in 2006, the all-time favourite film was chosen by viewers from any particular year, with the 1992 film Devar Magan emerging as winner. From 2007 onwards, viewers were asked to select their favourite film of the respective preceding year.

== Winners and nominees ==
Here is a list of the winners and nominations and the films for which they won and were nominated respectively.

- 2007 Pokkiri - S. Ramesh Babu
  - Billa - L.Suresh
  - Mozhi - Prakash Raj
  - Paruthiveeran - K. E. Gnanavelraja
  - Sivaji - M. S. Guhan
- 2008 Vaaranam Aayiram - Aascar films
  - Aegan - Ayngaran International
  - Dasavathaaram - Aascar films
  - Kuruvi - Red Giant Movies
  - Subramaniyapuram - Company Productions
- 2009 Ayan - AVM Productions
  - Aadhavan - Red Giant Movies
  - Kanthaswamy - Kalaipuli International
  - Naadodigal - Global Infotainment
  - Vettaikaaran - AVM Productions
- 2010 Endhiran - Sun Pictures
  - Singam - Studio Green
  - Vinnaithaandi Varuvaayaa - Escape Artists Motion Pictures
  - Aayirathil Oruvan - Dream Valley Corporation
  - Boss Engira Bhaskaran - Vasan Visual Ventures
- 2011 Ko - Elred Kumar
  - Mankatha - Dayanidhi Azhagiri
  - Siruthai - K. E. Gnanavel Raja
  - Velayudham - Aascar films
  - 7 Aum Arivu -Red Giant Movies
- 2012 Thuppakki - Kalaipuli Films International
  - Nanban - Gemini Film Circuit
  - Oru Kal Oru Kannadi - Red Giant movies
  - Naan Ee - Suresh Productions
  - Sundarapandian -Company Productions
- 2013 Thalaivaa - Sri Mishri Productions
  - Singam 2 - S. Lakshman Kumar
  - Vishwaroopam - Kamal Haasan
  - Raja Rani - AR Murugadoss
  - Varuthapadatha Valibar Sangam - P. Madhan
- 2014 Kaththi - Lyca Productions
  - Aranmanai - Sri Thenandal Films
  - Goli Soda - Bharath Seeni
  - Veeram - Vijaya Productions
  - Velaiyilla Pattathari - Wunderbar Films
- 2017 Mersal - Sri Thenandal Films

== See also ==
- Tamil cinema
- Cinema of India
