= Lockdown (2025 film) =

2025 Indian film by AR Jeeva

- Theatrical release poster
- Directed by: AR Jeeva
- Written by: AR Jeeva
- Produced by: Subaskaran
- Starring: Anupama Parameswaran; Charle; Livingston; Nirosha; Priya Venkat
- Cinematography: K. A. Sakthivel
- Edited by: V. J. Sabu Joseph
- Music by: N. R. Raghunanthan; Siddharth Vipin
- Production company: Lyca Productions
- Release dates: 23 November 2025 (IFFI); 30 January 2026 (India)
- Running time: 119 minutes
- Country: India
- Language: Tamil

Lockdown is a 2025 (Note: The film premiered at the 56th International Film Festival of India on 23 November 2025 and later released in theatres on 30 January 2026.) Indian Tamil-language drama thriller film directed by AR Jeeva in his debut starring Anupama Parameswaran in the lead role, alongside Charle, Livingston, Nirosha, Priya Venkat and others in important roles. The film is produced by Subaskaran under his Lyca Productions banner and the technical team consists of music composers N. R. Raghunanthan and Siddharth Vipin, cinematographer K. A. Sakthivel and editor V. J. Sabu Joseph.

Lockdown premiered at the 56th International Film Festival of India at Goa on 23 November 2025, and released in theatres on 30 January 2026.

== Plot ==
Anitha (Anupama Parameshwaran) is a Chennai based young woman who is in search of a job after her studies. She is from a middle class family. Her parents object her from doing night shift jobs and also from moving out of town. Hence, Anitha is forced to find a suitable job in her place itself. She keeps attending multiple interviews but in vain. As this happens, she is proposed to by an admirer of hers who happens to follow her for several months. She rejects the guy saying that she is not interested.

Anitha’s father is a small time employee who works for an affluent person. He dearly calls his boss Anna(brother) and his boss also reciprocates the warmth. One day, the boss’s daughter elopes and marries an unruly fellow. She lodges a complaint against her father that he might be a threat to her and her husband. The boss, his wife and Anitha’s father visit the police station to have a word her. She doesn’t budge even despite her parents begging her to not go with him. She leaves the place unbothered. Her parents are utterly shattered. Anitha’s father sees all this, goes home and vents to his wife that had he been in the same situation, he would have been already dead. So he requests his wife to keep an eye over their girls as to where they go and who they talk to. The wife assures him that nothing wrong is going happen as they have raised them to be righteous and modest. Anitha overhears all this conversation.

One day, she calls one of her employed friends and asks for help with finding a job. The employed friend says that she knows a HR in a company. She arranges for Anitha to meet him in a party. In the party her friend compels Anitha to drink. Anitha drinks, dances and loses consciousness. The person who proposes to her happens to be in the party and watches her get drunk and be free. The friend and HR then takes her to a room to let her rest and leave. Next day morning, Anitha comes home and still feels drowsy.

After 2 months, due to cough, she happens to visit a hospital and then finds out that she’s 10 weeks pregnant. She tries for abortion with the help of her friend Sapna but nobody helps. She is even defrauded for a money during the process. Exactly when she was supposed to attend a doctor for an appointment, a Nation wide lockdown is imposed due to COVID. She could not go out for more than a month and the foetus keeps growing making Anitha restless. She does not dare to tell at home about the pregnancy. After multiple failed attempts, Anitha and the friend manage to find a doctor who agrees to abort the pregnancy. He is none other than the person who proposed to her. He demands money which Anitha could not provide. He then asks Anitha to compromise with him so that he could perform the abortion. Having no other option, Anitha agrees. She is aborted of the child and in the end it is revealed that the doctor is actually a compounder. The takeaway message of the film is to rely on the parents first before anyone else.

== Cast ==
- Anupama Parameswaran as Anitha
- Charle as Suresh
- Livingston
- Nirosha as Sudha, Anitha's mother
- Priya Venkat as Swapna
- George Maryan
- Indhumathi
- Rajkumar
- Shamji
- Lollu Sabha Maaran
- Redin Kingsley
- Vinayak Raj
- Vidhu
- Abhirami
- Revathi
- Sanjeev Sureshkumar
- Priya Ganesh
- Asha

== Production ==
After Siren (2024), Anupama Parameswaran was announced to star in her next film titled Lockdown in the lead role, directed by AR Jeeva and produced by Lyca Productions. The announcement was made through a first-look poster that was released by the production house on 6 May 2024. The technical team consists of music composers N. R. Raghunanthan and Siddharth Vipin, cinematographer K. A. Sakthivel, editor V. J. Sabu Joseph, and art director A Jayakumar.

== Music ==
Lockdown

Soundtrack album by: N. R. Raghunanthan; Siddharth Vipin
- Genre: Feature film soundtrack
- Language: Tamil
- Label: Lyca Music
- Producers: N. R. Raghunanthan; Siddharth Vipin

N. R. Raghunanthan chronology
Marutham (2025)	Lockdown (2026)	Idimuzhakkam (TBA)

Siddharth Vipin chronology
Kooran (2024)	Lockdown (2026)

Singles from Lockdown
- 1. "Lava Lava" Released: 12 June 2024; 2. "Kanaa" Released: 25 November 2025

The first single titled "Lava Lava" composed by Siddharth Vipin was released on 12 June 2024. The second single titled "Kanaa" composed by N. R. Raghunanthan was released on 25 November 2025.

Track listing
No.	Title	Lyrics	Music	Singer(s)	Length
1.	"Lava Lava"	Snehan	Siddharth Vipin	Priya Jerson
2.	"Kanaa"	Sarathi	N. R. Raghunanthan	Aparna Harikumar

== Release ==
Lockdown premiered at the 56th International Film Festival of India at Goa on 23 November 2025, and was released in theatres on 30 January 2026. Initially the makers planned to release the film in June 2024. It was then scheduled to release on 5 December 2025, but was postponed due to heavy rains caused by Cyclone Ditwah. Later it was rescheduled to release in theatres on 12 December 2025, but it was postponed.

== Reception ==
Anusha Sundar of OTTPlay gave 2 out of 5 stars and wrote "Lockdown places its messaging above the core story it tells. A film that had scope to explore the body rights of a woman and the modus operandi that thrives in the underbelly of Indian medical fraternity, Lockdown, despite its honest Anupama at the forefront, misses the mark to imprint anything worthwhile." Roopa Radhakrishnan of The Times of India gave 2 out of 5 stars and wrote "Lockdown is a confusing film. The film isn't entirely sloppy without any heart. The sensitivity and the cautiousness with which the camera captures certain disturbing scenes isn't reflected in the screenplay."

The film was also reviewed by Asianet News, Cinema Vikatan, Dinamani, Dina Thanthi, Hindu Tamil Thisai and Zee News.
