= Kaththi =

2014 Indian film by A. R. Murugadoss

- Theatrical release poster
- Directed by: A. R. Murugadoss
- Written by: A. R. Murugadoss
- Produced by: Allirajah Subaskaran; K. Karunamoorthi
- Starring: Vijay; Samantha Ruth Prabhu; Neil Nitin Mukesh; Sathish
- Cinematography: George C. Williams
- Edited by: A. Sreekar Prasad
- Music by: Anirudh Ravichander
- Production company: Lyca Productions
- Distributed by: Ayngaran International; Eros International
- Release date: 22 October 2014 (India)
- Running time: 161 minutes
- Country: India
- Language: Tamil
- Budget: ₹50 crore
- Box office: ₹100-128 crore

Kaththi (transl. Knife) is a 2014 Indian Tamil-language action thriller film written and directed by A. R. Murugadoss. It is produced by Allirajah Subaskaran's Lyca Productions. The film stars Vijay in a dual role alongside Samantha, Neil Nitin Mukesh (in his Tamil debut), and Sathish. In the film, a petty thief assumes the identity of his lookalike and is pulled into a rebellion by farmers from the latter's village, Thanoothu, and helps them fight against an entrepreneur who exploited Thanoothu's water resources.

The film was officially announced in November 2013, and principal photography took place between February and September 2014. Primarily shot across Chennai, it was also filmed in Kolkata, Mumbai, Hyderabad, Rajahmundry, Begumpet, Nellore, and Kadapa. The cinematography was handled by George C. Williams, and the film was edited by A. Sreekar Prasad. The music is composed by Anirudh Ravichander. The film marks the Tamil debuts of Mukesh and Chowdhury.

Made on a budget of ₹50 crore, Kaththi was released worldwide on 22 October 2014, coinciding with Diwali, and received critical acclaim. Before the film's release, it faced controversies for plagiarism allegations, and the business link of Subaskaran, the film's producer, with Sri Lankan president Mahinda Rajapaksa, which resulted in Tamil fringe groups protesting against the film. Despite this, the film was a major commercial success, grossing ₹128 crore (equivalent to ₹223 crore or US$23 million in 2026), and was remade into Telugu as Khaidi No. 150 (2017). Kaththi is the second highest-grossing Tamil movie of 2014.

A recipient of various accolades, the film won three out of seven nominations at the Filmfare Awards South, including the Filmfare Award for Best Film – Tamil. It won four South Indian International Movie Awards (including Best Film) and two Vijay Awards (Favourite Film and Favourite Director for Murugadoss). Additionally, the film won an IIFA Utsavam and Ananda Vikatan Cinema Awards each, three Edison Awards and a nomination for Best Social Awareness at the Norway Tamil Film Festival Awards before eventually losing to Sigaram Thodu (2014).

== Plot ==
In Kolkata, Kathiresan "Kathir" is a prisoner who helps the police capture an escaping prisoner, Vivek Banerjee, but escapes himself afterwards. In Chennai, Kathir plans to run away to Bangkok with his friend Ravi. However, he drops this plan after falling in love with Ankitha. Later, Kathir and Ravi notice thugs shooting Jeevanandham "Jeeva", who resembles Kathir. They admit him to a hospital, and Kathir decides to impersonate Jeeva to avoid the police. Under Jeeva's name, Kathir and Ravi enter a retirement home run by Jeeva, planning to steal ₹25 lakh (equivalent to ₹44 lakh or US$45,000 in 2026) for their Bangkok trip until Kathir learns about Jeeva's mission.

Jeeva was a communist ideologue and postgraduate in hydrology from the arid village of Thanoothu in Tirunelveli district who had discovered groundwater underneath some lands of the hamlet. The villagers could use the water as an irrigation source for the entire Tirunelveli district and the neighbouring Thoothukudi district. However, a greedy entrepreneur, Chirag, tricked the villagers into giving their lands for factory construction by getting their fingerprints and killing them. Jeeva got arrested, and six villagers committed suicide brought this news to the forefront of the media and got Jeeva released.

Emotionally moved by Jeeva's past, Kathir takes up the cause for the villagers while still posing as Jeeva. The people of the retirement home and Kathir go to the jury to convince them in their favour, but Kathir starts reciting rules and scares the main juror (whom Chirag had bribed). Kathir then sends a person disguised as a hairdresser to Chirag and makes him lay a fingerprint on Chirag's neck. After that, Chirag sends fifty men to kill Kathir, but he defeats them. Meanwhile, Jeeva finds himself in the Kolkata prison. With the help of Vivek, who has heard his story and plans to kill Kathir, he escapes with Vivek's henchmen. Unaware that Jeeva is heading for Chennai with Vivek's henchmen, Kathir attempts to convince the media to bring the villagers' plight to national consciousness.

A few days later, at the Madras High Court, the judge delivers the verdict in favour of Jeeva and the villagers, but adds that Chirag claims that certain villagers working abroad have shown their support for the factory. If they cannot prove that Chirag faked their support within the next five days, the verdict will go in Chirag's favour. Since the villagers who have denied supporting the factory are abroad and cannot come to Chennai so soon to rebut Chirag's claims, Kathir decides to take drastic measures to sensationalise the issue. He, Ankitha, Ravi, and the retirement home inmates sit on the pipelines and block the water supply to Chennai. A few days after the plight of the Chennai people gained national attention, Kathir emerged and highlighted the villagers' plight to the media. His speech is broadcast nationwide.

Kathir discovers that Jeeva has escaped and is searching for him. Meanwhile, Jeeva and Vivek's henchmen reach Chennai, but Chirag's henchmen kidnap Jeeva. While in Chirag's custody, he sees Kathir's speech on television and feels moved by his efforts to help the villagers. On the eve before the verdict, a phone call exposes Kathir's bluff, but Kathir promises the villagers that he will surely help them. He tells them that Jeeva is alive and will rescue him from Chirag. Ravi also reveals to the villagers that Kathir's mother was a farmer like them, who migrated to the city due to water shortage, and was killed by a falling pillar while working as a manual labourer at a construction site. This is why Kathir decided to help the villagers.

Kathir goes to Chirag's office and tears Chirag's papers apart. Chirag then tries to shoot him with a gun only for Jeeva to push him aside and Kathir easily gains the upper hand against the goons initially. Chirag stabs him with a knife when a bunch of African goons attack Jeeva. Kathir is then brutally beaten up by the goons. Kathir somehow manages to kill the thugs one by one. Chirag then smashes a wooden log on Kathir's head, giving him a bloody scar and a heavy concussion. Kathir uses the last of his remaining strength to kill Chirag by impaling him on a plough. Kathir, now badly bruised and unable to stay conscious, asks Jeeva to leave as he fights off the remaining goons with Ravi's help.

The next day, the judge declares the verdict in favour of Jeeva and the villagers. Despite the success, Kathir does not take part in the ensuing celebrations. Instead, he surrenders to the police after promising Ankitha, who has fallen in love with him, that he will marry her once he is released.

== Cast ==
- Vijay in a dual role as
  - Kathiresan "Kathir"
  - Jeevanantham "Jeeva"
- Samantha Ruth Prabhu as Ankitha
- Neil Nitin Mukesh as Chirag
- Sathish as Ravi
- Tota Roy Chowdhury as Vivek Banerjee
- Sudip Mukherjee as Inspector Arnab Chatterjee
- Anu Krishna as Jeevanantham's sister
- Raneesh Thiyagarajan as Jeevanantham's lawyer
- Rama as Jeeva's mother
- Jeeva Ravi as the collector
- Nalinikanth as an old villager
- Ravi Venkatraman as a police officer
- Veera Santhanam as an old villager
- Elisabeth P. Carpenter as Katherine
- Chelladurai as an old villager
- Tamiko Brownlee as Jennifer
- Pambai Rajakavi as an old villager
- Ramjee as an old villager
- Udayabhanu as Periyasaamy
- RJ Sha as himself
- Kovai Babu as a journalist
- Vinod Sagar as Shanmugam
- Baby Yuvina as Ankitha's niece
- Chu Koy Sheng as barber from Tony & Guys' Salon
- Vetrivel Raja as Selvakumar
- Baby Shristi as Ankitha's niece
- Mathew Varghese as one of the businessmen (uncredited)

== Production ==
=== Development ===
In February 2013, director A. R. Murugadoss confirmed that he would collaborate with actor Vijay again, after the success of their Thuppakki (2012). By that July, the scripting was in its final stage, and filming was planned to begin in late-2013, after Vijay completed the shooting for Jilla, and Murugadoss' completion on the Hindi remake of Thuppakki, titled Holiday: A Soldier Is Never Off Duty (2014).

The project was officially confirmed by Murugadoss in mid-November 2013, through his Twitter page. Subaskaran Allirajah, a British-Sri Lankan based Tamil entrepreneur, agreed to become the major investor in the film, by producing it under his newly backed film distribution and production company Lyca Productions. The film eventually became the first production of the company, with Ayngaran International co-producing.

Murugadoss replaced his usual music composer Harris Jayaraj with Anirudh Ravichander signing for the project. George C. Williams, who worked on the director's production Raja Rani (2013), was signed as the cinematographer. Art director Lalgudi N. Ilayaraja was selected to handle the production design. In March 2014, Murugadoss confirmed that the film would be titled Kaththi and that it was scheduled to be released on Diwali.

=== Casting ===
"There is a tendency for any villain to go over the top while playing a baddie. I have avoided that in Kaththi. I wanted to ensure my character doesn't go overboard and only appear as someone who is bad by nature and not by looks [...] Another thing audiences will find in my character is that I won't come across as a usual south Indian villain. Thanks to my stylist Rupali, I've been made as stylish as Brad Pitt and David Beckham. Since I play a foreign-returned character, I wanted to look like I belong there."

— Neil Nitin Mukesh about his role in Kaththi.

Murugadoss stated that Vijay will play dual roles in the film, and his character names were revealed as Kathiresan and Jeevanantham. In September 2013, even before the film was officially announced, Samantha Ruth Prabhu was reportedly selected as the female lead in September 2013. Speaking about her role in the film, Murugadoss stated that "Samantha has exceeded my expectations for the role [...] She always carries a smiling face and bring a lot of energy on the sets and has added more flavor to every scene."

Bengali actor Tota Roy Chowdhury was signed for an antagonistic role in February 2014. In March 2014, Neil Nitin Mukesh was selected to play the main antagonist, making his debut in Tamil cinema. Neil was inspired by his look in his debut film, Johnny Gaddaar (2007). He described his character as one who does not "fight the hero with physical power, but with intelligence". He learned Tamil for his role, as he did not want to speak his dialogues without understanding their meaning. Neil had lost weight for the role and modelled his looks on the American actor Brad Pitt and the English footballer David Beckham. Forty elderly people played people from the old age home.

=== Filming ===
The film was launched in Kolkata on 3 February 2014 by Lyca Productions with a pooja ceremony in front of the Kalighat Kali Temple, after which principal photography began. A fight sequence was canned in this schedule for seven days, and later the team returned to Chennai on 10 February 2014, for a song shoot which took place at Chennai International Airport from 14 to 17 February, with special permissions being procured to shoot at the runway. On 20 February, the team headed to Hyderabad for shooting a major 30-day schedule at Rajahmundry and Begumpet. After a break for two-weeks, shooting resumed on 13 March in Hyderabad with another song being shot at Ramoji Film City.

A climax sequence featuring Vijay and Neil, made at a cost of ₹10 million (US$100,000) was shot at Nellore in mid-April. The film was then shot in Pushpa Gardens in Chennai, where a huge set which costed around ₹12.5 million (US$130,000) was erected and most of the indoor scenes were completed in this set. Shooting continued for a 40-day-long schedule in and around the city by 2 June 2014. In between, Murugadoss, took a break to promote his then upcoming Hindi film, Holiday: A Soldier Is Never Off Duty in Mumbai. After Murugadoss returned to Chennai on 8 June, followed by location scouting, shooting of the film resumed, the following day. On 26 June 2014, the team headed to Kadapa for a 12-day schedule. By July 2014, 60 percent of the film's shoot had been completed.

The final leg of the film began on 1 August 2014 in Chennai. In late August 2014, 15 days of filming, including patch-work and a few fight sequences, remained. Filming moved back to Hyderabad, where the rest of the fight sequences were canned. On 1 September 2014, the second half of the film was nearly completed. Additional filming took place at the Chennai Central railway station. On 4 September 2014, Neil Nitin Mukesh dubbed in Tamil himself for his role and completed his dubbing portions for the first half of the film. The climax sequences were shot in Nellore on 23 September 2014 and talkie portions had also been completed within two days. The song "Selfie Pulla" was shot in Mumbai, with about 100 dancers participating in the song sequence. Filming of that song was completed on 30 September 2014, with entire shooting being completed as a result.

== Themes and influences ==
Kaththi deals with the suicide of farmers due to corporate encroachment. The film also deals with several themes such as water scarcity, corruption, communism, the ill-effects of capitalism and industrialisation and problems faced by farmers in daily lives. The character Jeevanantham is named after a social activist, whom Murugadoss was inspired by. Rockline Venkatesh, the producer of Lingaa, denied the connection of the film's script with that of Kaththi.

In the film, Jeevanantham, in a single dialogue, illustrates about the basic tenets of communism using idlies. In the press meet scene, the character Kathiresan mentions several political incidents, this included the 2G spectrum case, and the encroachment of Pepsi in the banks of river Thamirabharani. In October 2014, a petition was filed against Vijay and Murugadoss regarding the 2G spectrum case and slammed them for defamation. The complainant R. Ramasubramanian questioned how a film can conclude that all those involved in the 2G spectrum case are corrupt when the case is still being heard in court, adding that the dialogue portrayed all those people in poor light and damaged their dignity. The court however, dismissed those claims later.

Civil servant and bureaucrat Alex Paul Menon IAS, however, was critical of the film, for its messaging against water conservation. He added that the deep borewells and encroachment of the lakes and ponds were responsible for the water scarcity and not just the multinational soft-drink companies, as shown in the film. In a positive note, B. Kolappan, writing for The Hindu, noted on how the film appealed to the leftist ideologies over its content, and that led to being favored by Communist Party of India (Marxist) and its pro-leftist organizations.

Sowmya Rajendran of The News Minute called Kaththi as what "Kollywood likes to call a "message" film made in a mainstream format" and the enormous success of the film "coupled with the general public mood (on social media especially) after the jallikattu protests of 2017, which have made the "farmer sentiment" so popular on screen". According to Bhuvanesh Chandar of The Hindu, "Many films of actor-turned-politician Vijay, like Thamizhan, Kaththi, and Mersal have used press conferences to tell audiences a message without breaking the fourth wall; this is a trope that can be looked at as an evolution from the Parasakthi-like or Citizen-like speech by the hero at a courthouse."

== Music ==
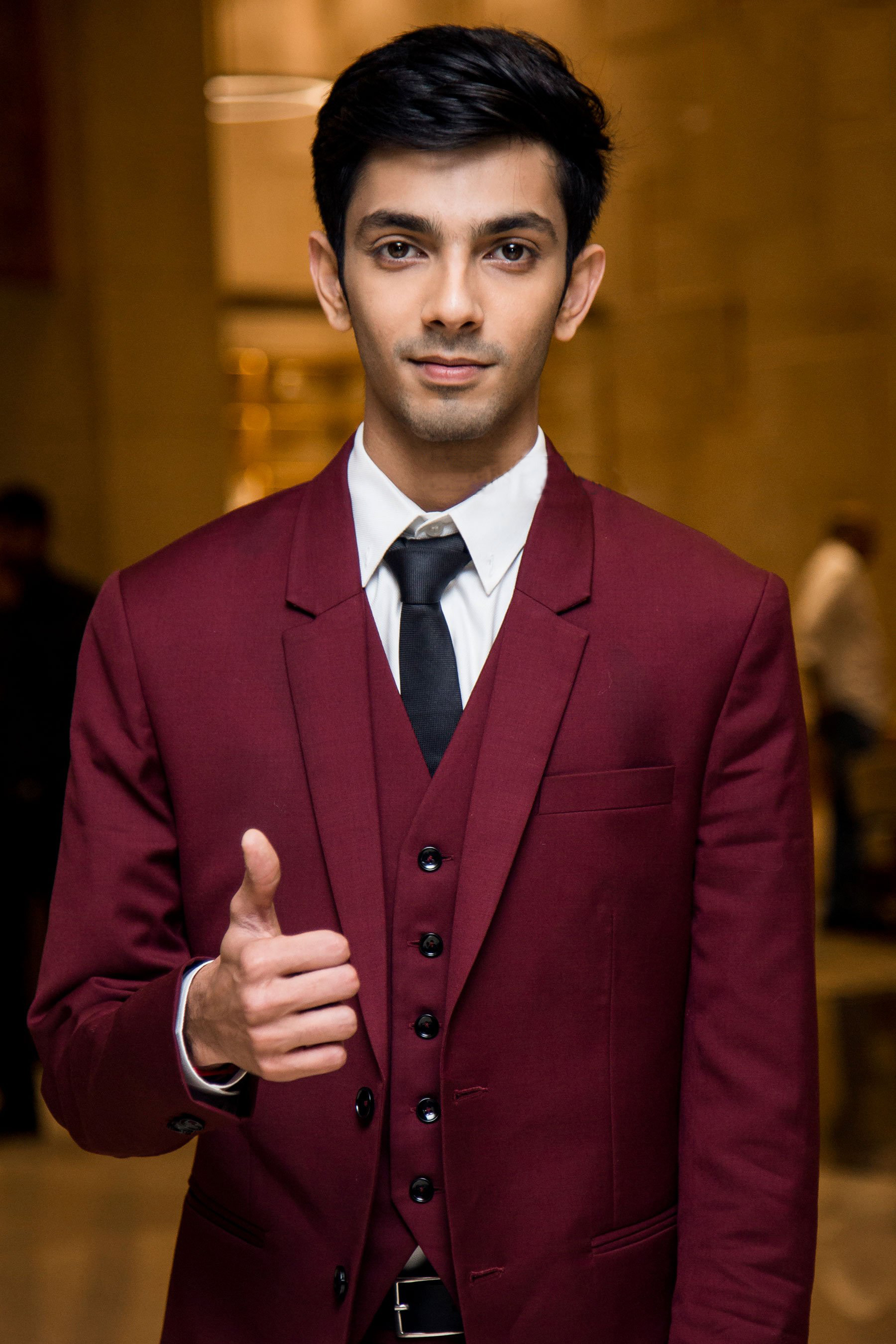
Anirudh Ravichander composed the film's soundtrack and score.

The soundtrack and film score are composed by Anirudh Ravichander, in his first collaboration with Vijay and Murugadoss. Before signing the project, Anirudh had composed the theme music of the film, which was accompanied with the motion poster was released on YouTube on 22 June 2014, coinciding with actor Vijay's birthday. The album was under production from late-2013 and continued until September 2014. The soundtrack album consists of seven tracks, with lyrics written by Madhan Karky, Yugabharathi, Pa. Vijay and Hiphop Tamizha. The album, in its entirety was released on 24 September 2014, at the audio launch event held at The Leela Palace Hotel in Chennai. The songs and the film score were widely appreciated; On 28 January 2015, the crew released the film's original background score through YouTube, to coincide with the film's 100-day celebration.

== Marketing ==
Murugadoss chose creative designer Gopi Prasannaa to work on the promotional materials of the film. The first look and motion poster was released on 21 June 2014, the eve of Vijay's birthday (22 June 2014). The first look featured a still of Vijay being made with a collage of newspaper headlines. The motion poster featured a creative design of prominent places in Chennai, and the entire city itself recreated and draped in the form of news headlines, and the final image, the still from the poster, in the end. According to Prasanna, Kaththi became the first mainstream Tamil film to introduce first looks. He did not use the photograph of Vijay in the design, and created a newspaper collage to resemble Vijay's face. The production team were initially sceptical of the idea, but after the release, he was later commended for his creative efforts. Within a week, the motion poster crossed more than 1 million views.

The official teaser of the film was released on 24 September 2014, coinciding with the film's audio launch event. An Android game based on the film was launched during early-October, with the 3D and 2D versions of the game being released through Google Play Store and Windows Store. The trailer of the film was unveiled on 19 October 2014, three days ahead of the film's release, and received a positive response from viewers. Before the theatrical release, the film's posters were branded in the AC coaches of Parasuram Express which travels through Nagercoil to Mangalore via Kerala, and at inter-state buses in Kerala and Karnataka. Post release, two events were held to commemorate the film's successful theatrical run; one being held at Coimbatore on 27 October 2014, and another event at Tirunelveli on 14 December 2014, to coincide the film's 50th day theatrical run.

== Release ==
Kaththi was released on 22 October 2014, coinciding with the Diwali festival. The film was released in more than 1300 screens worldwide. The film released in 400 screens in Tamil Nadu and 200 screens in Kerala, setting a record at screen count. In overseas, the film was released in US in 105 screens, which is considered as the biggest Tamil release in the country, and in Canada, the film released on 21 screens. The film released in United Kingdom on 70 screens, and in France on 24 screens. The film released in Sri Lanka, on 28 screens, and in Australia on 16 screens. The film was released in Malaysia on 120 screens, which is highest for a Tamil film at that time.

The satellite rights of the film were sold to Jaya TV. Shibu Thameens purchased the Kerala theatrical rights. The theatrical rights in Tiruchirappalli and Thanjavur were sold to T. Siva of Boss Films. Prominent film producer Tagore Madhu acquired the theatrical rights in Andhra Pradesh and Telangana. MM Media, previously known as GK Media, acquired the film's theatrical rights in the USA. Goldie Films acquired the theatrical distribution rights in Karnataka. The film was sold out in all the territories, nine days before the film's theatrical release.

The Telugu-dubbed version, which was planned to release along with the Tamil version, was pushed to 31 October 2014 and later to 21 November. The dubbed version was dropped, in favour of a Telugu remake titled Khaidi No. 150, which was planned by the producer. The film was also dubbed and released in Hindi under the title Khaki Aur Khiladi. and was released through YouTube in 2017.

On Vijay's 45th birthday (22 June 2019), fans organized a re-release of the film in Palakkad, following his fandom in Kerala. Another re-release of the film held on the actor's 50th birthday, with other films, Ghilli (2004), Pokkiri (2007), Thuppakki (2012), Mersal (2017) and Master (2021). The film was released in Japan on 1 November 2024.

== Controversies ==
=== Plagiarism allegations ===
The 41-second first-look motion poster drew comparisons with the popular minute-long advertisement campaign run by a Turkish newspaper, Sabah, to announce their distribution of the New York Times as a supplement. The original advertisement features iconic images of the cities of New York City and Istanbul, designed using news articles and headlines from the newspaper to show the two cities in the form of newspaper clippings. The motion poster of the film showed prominent places in Chennai and the entire city itself in the form of newspaper clippings and headlines, just like the advertisement campaign, without an acknowledgement to the makers of the original.

Minjur Gopi Nayinar filed a case against Murugadoss, claiming that the plot of the film was copied from his novel Mootha Kudi. In late-September 2014, the court declared the case in Murugadoss's favour, citing lack of proper evidence found against him. In response to the film's allegations on plagiarism, director Vikraman advocated directors to register their scripts at the screenwriter's association to avoid plagiarism.

Anbu Rajasekar, a short film director also claimed the plagiarism allegation, levied against Murugadoss saying that the plot was lifted from his 2013 short film Thaaga Bhoomi, which was selected at the Norway Tamil Film Festival and also won second prize in a short film contest judged by Director Balu Mahendra. He further shared a scene-to-scene comparison of the short film with Kaththi to further substantiate his claim and wrote a letter to Murugadoss on late-October, claiming that his story was used in the film without permission. Since, there was no favourable reply from the director, he filed a case in the Thanjavur High Court against Vijay, Murugadoss, Lyca Productions and the cinematographer George C. Williams. The case went on for four years, and since there was no development, Anbu with his family, subjected to a 10-day hunger strike from 31 October to 10 November 2018, and also filed a petition signed by over 100 villagers, which was submitted to the office of Edappadi K. Palaniswami, the then-Chief Minister of Tamil Nadu. In December 2019, the Madras High Court dismissed the proceedings against Vijay, Lyca and three others, saying that "there was no material against them about the allegations of plagiarism and the short film had not been registered under the Copyright Act, 1957".

=== Business link allegations ===
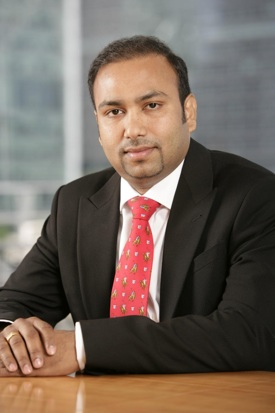
Subaskaran Allirajah, who produced Kaththi under Lyca Productions, was alleged to have business links with Sri Lankan politician Mahinda Rajapaksa. Allirajah, however refuted such claims in several instances.

Subaskaran Allirajah, chairman of Lyca Mobiles, whose company Lyca Productions co-produced the film along with Ayngaran International, was claimed to have had business links with the President of Sri Lanka, Mahinda Rajapaksa. Murugadoss and Karunamoorthy of Ayngaran International met pro-Eelam leaders – Pazha Nedumaran, film director and Naam Tamilar Katchi's (NTK) leader Seeman and Viduthalai Chiruthaigal Katchi's (VCK) Thol. Thirumavalavan — to explain their position regarding the allegation, but the talks proved to be inconclusive at that time. A collective of four student bodies – Maatram Maanavar Ilaiyor Iyakkam, Free Tamil Eelam Students Organisation, Tamil Youth and Students Association, and Progressive Students Front – in Tamil Nadu called for a ban on the film, stating that the film promoted the economic and political interests of Sri Lanka. The students were willing to reconsider their position on the film if Lyca Productions formally withdrew as producer. In August 2014, Seeman and Vikraman showed support for the film.

Despite clarifications, as many as 65 Tamil groups came together to oppose the film, leading to speculations regarding Lyca stepping down as producer and handing the reins to another production group. Karunamoorthy, however, again denied that Allirajah had business links with either Mahinda Rajapaksa or his family in any way, further saying that a press meet would be held where all doubts and suspicions regarding Lyca Productions would be clarified and that the film would be released under the Lyca Productions banner. As per Karunamoorthy's statement, a press meet was held on 16 September 2014, where the vice-chairman of Lyca Productions, Premananthan Sivasamy, Subaskaran and Karunamoorthy were present. A statement with a detailed clarification was shown in which it was mentioned that Lyca did not have any business links with Rajapaksa or anyone else related to him, thereby confirming the planned release of the film on Diwali.

A meeting with the pro-Tamil groups, with Tamil Nadu Theatre Owners Association, exhibitors and distributors was held, three days before the release and after a favourable response, the theatre owners officially confirmed the planned release. However, on 20 October, few members from the Tamil groups had damaged the properties and glass panes at Sathyam cinemas and Woodlands Cinemas, which resulted in huge trouble before its release. Later, actor Vijay confirmed that the issues with the pro-Tamils' have been resolved and Lyca Productions' name was being removed from the film and its promotional materials, thereby meeting their demands. He also thanked the then-Chief Minister of Tamil Nadu, J. Jayalalithaa for extending the support towards the film's release. Later, the Madras High Court allowed the producers name and the company logo to be credited on theatres, and other print media.

Actor Mohan Raman in his blog for The Hindu, noted on Kaththi being "the latest in a series of films that have been greeted by bans in Tamil Nadu" with other films such as Thyaga Bhoomi (1939), Parasakthi (1952), Arangetram (1973), Bombay (1995), Iruvar (1997) and the Hindi film Madras Cafe (2013).

== Reception ==
=== Box office ===
Kaththi netted around ₹23.8 crore (US$2.5 million) worldwide on the opening day of its release (22 October 2014). The film collected ₹12.5 crore (US$1.3 million) in Tamil Nadu alone on its opening day, and registered the best opening collections in Trichy, Thanjavur, Tirunelveli, Kanyakumari and Madurai. It reported a full 100% occupancy on the film's opening day, despite the controversies, delayed advance bookings and low-key promotions. The film also collected ₹1.95 crore (US$200,000) in Kerala and ₹15 crore (US$1.6 million) in Karnataka, thereby collecting an estimated ₹15.4 crore (US$1.6 million) at the domestic box office. At Bangalore (Karnataka), the film had earned ₹1.03 crore (US$110,000) in the second day of the release (23 October 2014) and another ₹1.5 crore (US$160,000) in the state, thereby bringing the two-day collections to ₹3 crore (US$310,000).

In the extended-five day weekend, the film collected ₹71.05 crore (US$7.4 million) at the worldwide box office, and became the actor's first film to cross the ₹50 crore (US$5.2 million) mark worldwide. At the domestic box-office, the film collected around ₹36 crore (US$3.7 million) in Tamil Nadu, ₹50 crore (US$5.2 million) in Karnataka and ₹55 crore (US$5.7 million) in Kerala, to achieve a net collection of ₹47 crore (US$4.9 million) in five days. In Chennai city alone, the film netted ₹3.01 crore (US$310,000) in the first week with an average theatre occupancy of 97% and stood in the first position. The second week witnessed an occupancy of 85% in the city and netted around ₹5.32 crore (US$550,000). The film still stood at the number one position in Chennai by the third week resulting in a total collection of ₹67.98 million (US$710,000). It surpassed the collections of Velaiilla Pattadhari, Maan Karate, Veeram and Jilla at the Chennai box-office.

Kaththi reached the ₹100 crore (US$10 million) mark in 12 days of its release. The film took a worldwide distributor share of ₹62 crore (US$6.4 million) within twelve days of its release. The film was bought for a record price in Karnataka by a leading distributor, and opened well at the box-office there. The film collected around ₹36 crore (US$3.7 million) in Tamil Nadu, ₹5 crore (US$520,000) in Karnataka and ₹5.5 crore (US$570,000) in Kerala in five days. After a long run for nine weeks at the Chennai box office, the film netted around ₹7.83 crore (US$810,000). Kaththi completed a 100 days theatrical run on 29 January 2015.

The film earned $142,805 in its USA premiere on 21 October 2014. It is considered to be an "all-time record for a non-Rajinikanth film in the US" and became the second Tamil-film to gross $100,000 besides and surpassing Enthiran (2010). Within five days of its release, the film surpassed the $5,00,000 mark. Kaththi became the highest grossing Tamil film of 2014 in US. In France, Kaththi opened with about ₹3.1 million (US$32,000) which is a new record for an Indian film. The distributor Ayngaran International stated that Kaththi had the biggest opening for a Tamil film in UK since it released in over 70 screens there and also topped the weekend box office in Malaysia. It also has set new records in Singapore grossing over $201,408. In the UK box office it grossed £319,310 in 12 days. In Australia, Kaththi collected $160,890 and has surpassed the opening weekend collection of Kochadaiyaan ($119,597) and Anjaan ($107,013) for 2014. The film had a lifetime business of over A$194,341 in Australia and became the highest grossing Tamil film of the year there. The film made approximately $1.86 million in Malaysia and emerged as the third highest Tamil grosser there. The film's worldwide gross was reported to be around ₹132.60 crore (equivalent to ₹231 crore or US$24 million in 2026).

=== Critical response ===
A critic from Sify gave Kaththi 4 out of 5 and stated, "the movie is a well made entertainer with a powerful message". S. Saraswathi of Rediff stated, "Kaththi attempts to highlight the pathetic condition of farmers, whose lives are being destroyed by callous multinational corporations" and rated it 3 out of 5 as well. Arathi Kannan of Onmanorama rated 3.25 out of 5 and wrote "The screenplay could have benefited with some good writing; to actually be narrating pertinent issues inside the fabric of an entertainer doesn't quite justify it. In here, it's as though directors Mani Ratnam and Shankar thrashed out the outline over a cup of tea and left it behind for Murugadoss' treatment. That wasn't the best of ideas, but it just might work very well."

Anupama Subramanian of Deccan Chronicle gave 3.5 out of 5 stars and stated, "Vijay as Kathiresan in an author backed role does a neat job to satiate his fans playing his role packing with punches, humor, romance, right emotions and of course his forte – breezy dance movements. Vijay's lengthy speech with the press towards the end earns lot of appreciation. On the contrary, the director has etched a weak characterization for Jeevanandham, who fights for a cause, but beyond that he is projected neither brainy nor brawny. Murugadoss brings to the fore critical social issues like farmers suicide, water scarcity, etc, but at times it looks too preachy. Wish Murugadoss could have opted for a tauter screenplay." Ananda Vikatan rated the film 42 out of 100.

In contrast, Baradwaj Rangan of The Hindu wrote "The ideas are snappy – the reveal of the person injured in a shootout; the identity of a couple of television reporters – but the staging is shockingly flat." M. Suganth of The Times of India gave 3 stars out of 5 and wrote, "unlike Thuppakki, the previous Murugadoss-Vijay effort, Kaththi is overlong, over-the-top, over-familiar, and overtly preachy". Writing for India Today, Haricharan Pudipeddi gave 2.5 out of 5 and summarised "Kaththi is a commercial film and naturally audiences except some heroism, action and romance in it. But here Murugadoss has portrayed his hero as a messiah, a man of the masses willing to even sacrifice his life."

=== Accolades ===
Kaththi received eight nominations at the 62nd edition of Filmfare Awards South and won three — Best Film, Best Director (Murugadoss) and Best Choreography (Shobi). It was nominated at ten categories at the 9th Vijay Awards, winning two — Favourite Film and Favourite Director (Murugadoss), and seven categories at the 4th South Indian International Movie Awards and won four awards: Best Film, Best Actor in a Negative Role (Neil), Best Fight Choreographer (Anal Arasu) and Best Dance Choreographer (Shobi). It was nominated in three categories at the inaugural IIFA Utsavam awards, where it fetched the award for Best Music Director (Ravichander), the only win in that ceremony. Among other wins, the film received three Edison Awards and one Ananda Vikatan Cinema Awards. It also received a nomination for Best Social Awareness at the Norway Tamil Film Festival Awards, but it lost to Sigaram Thodu (2014).

== Remakes ==
The film's Telugu remake was eventually planned by few distributors before the release, but in November 2014, the distributor B. Madhu had claimed that there will not be a Telugu remake of this film. In April 2015, plans for remaking the film in Telugu reportedly progressed with N. T. Rama Rao Jr. playing the lead role. In October, it was announced that Chiranjeevi will star in the remake, which would be directed by V. V. Vinayak and his 150th film as a lead actor. It was officially confirmed in December 2015, with Chiranjeevi's son Ram Charan making his debut as a producer, by financing the project under Konidela Production Company. The film titled Khaidi No. 150, was directed by V. V. Vinayak and released in January 2017. In July 2019, it was reported that the film will be remade in Hindi as Ikka, starring Akshay Kumar and would be directed by Jagan Shakti. The film was expected to begin production in late-2019, was shelved in December 2020, after the co-producer Fox Star Studios exited from the film production in India. (Note: Later re-branded as Star Studios after the acquisition of 21st Century Fox by Disney, that led to the removal of "Fox" name and actively producing films in Bollywood.)

== Legacy ==
"It is not like there haven't been movies centred around farmers or spoke about their issues in the past. But there are two different aspects to that. If the movie's overall design has a farmer at the centre, like Lenin Bharathi's slightly arty Merku Thodarchi Malai, then there is absolutely no room for doubts over the film's intent [...] Case two is when filmmakers milk a societal issue to its maximum potential, to elicit responses from the audience. That is when the problem arises."

— Srivatsan S., writing in The Hindu about the increase of films with the farmer's issue, being featured as a sub-plot.

Kaththi eventually featured in the list of "Best Tamil Films of 2014" by various publications including The Hindu and Sify. According to Nivedita Mishra of Hindustan Times, the film "set records through box-office and social media". Srivatsan S. of The Hindu called it one of the "best masala films of the decade in Tamil cinema" and one of the "films with best 'mass' music being featured in the last decade in Tamil cinema". Kaththi which became the first in mainstream Tamil cinema to introduce the concept of "first look" and "motion poster", became one of the "best first looks designed for Vijay's films" according to Times Now. It has also been noted as one of the popular films that created buzz with its title announcement; this trend was then followed by Valimai and Vikram (both 2022), and Vijay's Leo (2023). Kaththi was also the first Tamil film that did not contain disclaimer about smoking and drinking, as there were no smoking or drinking scenes being featured in the film. (Note: Moondru Per Moondru Kaadhal (2013) which released a year before Kaththi too did not contain disclaimer about drinking and smoking.) Other films which followed the similar pattern, were Miruthan (2016), Spyder (2017), Thaanaa Serndha Koottam (2018) and Hero (2019).

Social media and news articles cited Kaththi as one of Vijay's films that elevated him to the path of super-stardom, that eventually continued after the success of Mersal (2017), Sarkar (2018) and Bigil (2019). Irrespective of the controversies, the film became a profitable venture for its producers Lyca Productions. The film's success also led Lyca to become one of the popular film production and distribution studios in Tamil cinema, whose notable ventures include Naanum Rowdy Dhaan (2015), Visaranai (2015), Kolamaavu Kokila, Vada Chennai and 2.0 (2018), which was considered to be the most expensive Indian film to that point.

Kaththi's success led several filmmakers to direct films based on agriculture and problems faced by farmers. The interest eventually showed a steeping growth after the 2017 pro-jallikattu protests and the month-long Tamil Nadu Farmers protest happening in the same year, with filmmakers covering the subject to cope with the general sentiments of the public. As a result, several Tamil films based on farming and agriculture were produced in the last few years. Sowmya Rajendran of The News Minute said that "From 'mother sentiment', films have now moved to 'farmer sentiment'". In an article in The Hindu, about the "decade's top 10 trends in Tamil cinema", Srivatsan S. opined that the farmer's issue is "the hottest sub-genre in Tamil cinema, and has become an easy gateway for filmmakers to package 'valuable' messages". This eventually became the subject of criticism from cinephiles, as they felt the trope was "repetitive" and "formulaic" and the commercial factors divert the "message regarding the problems faced by farmers in India".

== Popular culture ==
The scene where Kathir (Vijay) visualises a floor plan in three-dimensions was parodied by Neeraj Madhav in Adi Kapyare Kootamani (2015) and Sivakarthikeyan in Rajinimurugan (2016). Kathir's introduction in the pipeline was spoofed by Vishal in Kaththi Sandai. In the 2017 film Balloon, Jai's character walks with an iron rod to beat up a group of goons, modelled on the coin fight scene in the film, and the instrumental theme "The Sword of Destiny" was mimicked in the background. Jai's character in the film was named Jeevandhanam, after one of the characters played by Vijay. The extended press conference scene featured in the film was spoofed in Tamizh Padam 2 (2018).

The 2019 Tamil film Boomerang, was said to be heavily inspired from the film, as the lead actor Atharvaa played dual roles and it also dealt with farmers' issue. The Telugu film Maharshi, which was released in the same year, starring Mahesh Babu has said to be influenced by Kaththi as both the films focus on agriculture. Janani K. of India Today gave a mixed review for the film and wrote: "Mahesh Babu gets his own underwhelming Kaththi".
