= Chris Tooley =

English cricketer

Personal information
- Full name: Christopher Donald Michael Tooley
- Born: 19 April 1964 (age 62); Bromley, Kent
- Batting: Right-handed
- Bowling: Right-arm medium

Domestic team information
- Years: Team
- 1985–1987: Oxford University
- 1986–1987: Combined Universities
- 1999: Kent Cricket Board

Career statistics
Competition	First-class	List A
Matches	25	8
Runs scored	667	130
Batting average	19.61	18.57
100s/50s	0/3	0/1
Top score	66	62
Balls bowled	45	6
Wickets	2	0
Bowling average	18.50	–
5 wickets in innings	0	–
10 wickets in match	0	–
Best bowling	1/16	–
Catches/stumpings	9/–	1/–
- Source: Cricinfo, 31 October 2025

Christopher Donald Michael Tooley (born 19 April 1964) is an English former cricketer and a business executive, formerly the Group CEO of Lycamobile. Tooley played cricket as a right-handed batsman who bowled right-arm medium pace.

== Cricket career ==
Born at Bromley in Kent and educated at St Dunstan's College in Catford and Magdalen College, Oxford, Tooley made his first-class debut for Oxford University against Somerset in 1985. He played 25 first-class matches, 23 for the university and two for combined Oxford and Cambridge University sides, between 1985 and 1987, the last of which came in the 1987 University Match against Cambridge. He won Blues for cricket in each of his three years at university and captained the Oxford side in his final year. In his 25 first-class matches, he scored 667 runs at a batting average of 19.61, with three half centuries and a highest score of 66. He took two wickets at a bowling average of 18.50, with best figures of one wicket for 16 runs.

Tooley also played in eight List A matches. In 1986 and 1987 he played seven times for Combined Universities, making his debut against Hampshire in the 1986 Benson & Hedges Cup. He later played a single List A match for the Kent Cricket Board against the Worcestershire Cricket Board in the 1999 NatWest Trophy. He played club cricket for Bromley Cricket Club in the Kent Cricket League as well as playing for a variety of club sids, including Harlequins, The Stoics, and MCC.

== Business career ==
Tooley held senior positions at Lycamobile, a London-based provider of international calling services with operations in several countries. He was described as a "company veteran" when he was appointed as CEO of Lycamobile Group in 2014. He left the role in 2023, and later that year was removed as a director of Lycamobile UK Ltd.

In October 2023, along with other Lycamobile executives, Tooley was sentenced in France to a three-year jail term, part suspended, and fined 250,000 euros for complicity in VAT tax fraud and money laundering involving Lycamobile and associated companies. He was also banned from managing a company in France for a period of five years.
