= Lyca Mobile =

Mobile virtual network operator

- Type: Private
- Industry: Telecommunications
- Founded: September 2006
- Founder: Allirajah Subaskaran
- Headquarters: United Kingdom; Sri Lanka
- Key people: Allirajah Subaskaran (Chairman)
- Products: Mobile telecommunications services Broadcasting
- Revenue: ▼£25.1 million (UK, 2022)
- Subsidiaries: Lyca Productions; EAP Films; Swarnavahini; ETV; Shree FM; Lyca Kovai Kings; Jaffna Kings
- Website: lycamobile.com

Lyca Mobile (formerly Lycamobile) is a mobile virtual network operator (MVNO) operating in 18 countries, with headquarters in the United Kingdom and Sri Lanka. It provides international pay-as-you-go SIM cards. The company is chaired by Allirajah Subaskaran, who formed the company in 2006.

As an MVNO, Lyca Mobile does not own its own mobile network but instead leases radio frequencies from established network operators. It has also established mobile virtual network aggregator (MVNA) arrangements in certain regions.

== History ==
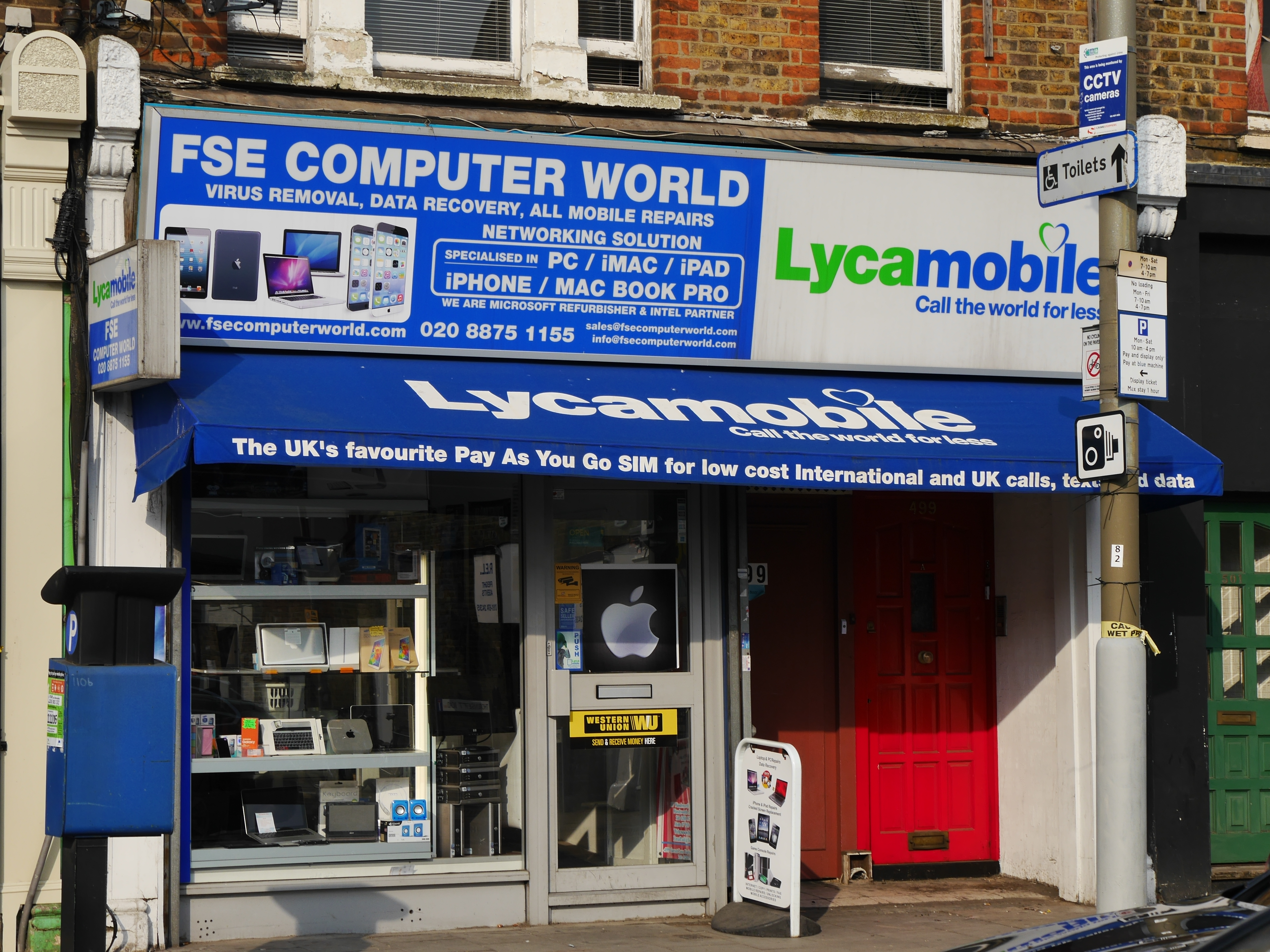
Lycamobile signage, Garratt Lane, Earlsfield, London

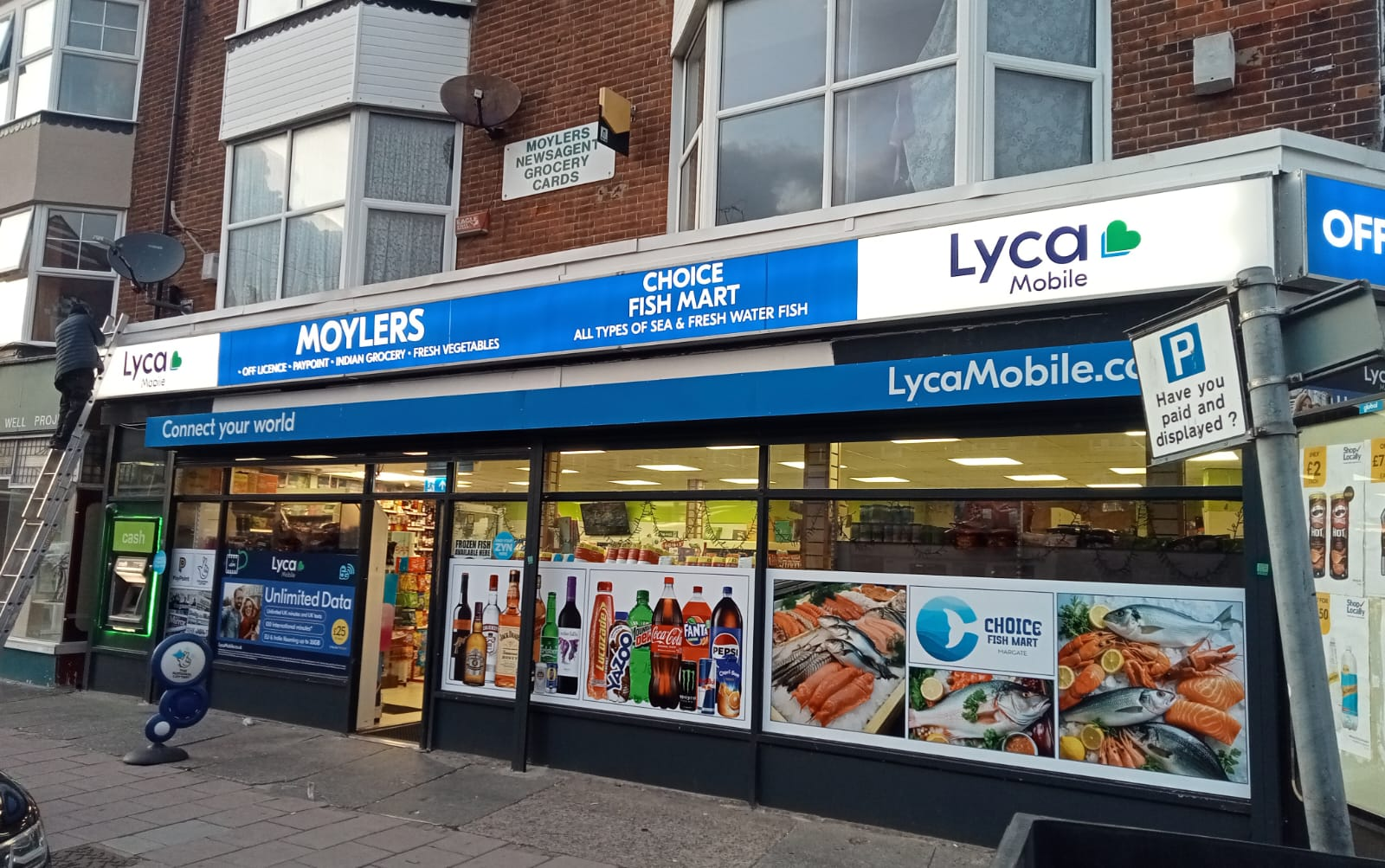
Lycamobile signage, 2025

Lycamobile was launched by British-based Sri Lankan entrepreneur Allirajah Subaskaran in 2006. By 2016, the company had more than 15 million customers.

In 2016, nearly twenty Lyca Mobile employees were arrested in France, and about half of them charged with money laundering. As of 2020, Lyca Mobile is involved in three major tax disputes with HM Revenue and Customs in the UK. The previous CEO, Chris Tooley, was given a suspended prison sentence in 2023 for his involvement in an "elaborate money laundering system" in France.

== Operations ==
The company operates in 18 countries. Lycamobile offered services in Hong Kong from April 2015, but its services were suspended from 6 April 2018.

In October 2023, Lycamobile's French companies were convicted of committing value-added tax (VAT) and money laundering fraud, subject to appeal, with a fine of €10 million.

In August 2024, HM Revenue and Customs (HMRC) filed winding-up petitions for three Lycamobile companies in the United Kingdom. A tax tribunal had ruled in favour of HMRC in July on a long running dispute over a £51 million value-added tax (VAT) claim, though this appears not to be related to the winding-up petitions. The company auditors had not been able to sign-off company accounts in June because of insufficient audit evidence being available to them.

In the United States, as of December 2024, the Better Business Bureau stated that as Lycamobile had received 147 complaints, and had failed to respond to 13 of them, Lycamobile's rating with the BBB is an F (on a scale of A+ to F).

Country	Year	Partner network
Australia	2014	Vodafone / TPG
Austria	2013	A1 Telekom
Belgium	2006	Telenet
Denmark	2009	Norlys
France	2006	Bouygues Telecom
Germany	2012	Telefónica
Ireland	2009	EIR
Italy	2010	Vodafone
Netherlands	2006	KPN
Norway	2009	Telia
Poland	2017	Plus
Portugal	2012	Vodafone
Sweden	2009	Telenor
Switzerland	2009	Salt
Ukraine	2017	3mob
Uganda	2020	MNO (Tangerine)
United Kingdom	2006	EE
United States	2014	T-Mobile + AT&T

== Other businesses ==
=== GT Mobile ===
GT Mobile (also known as "Gnanam Telecom") is a MNVO sub-brand of Lycamobile that operates in Denmark, Germany, The Netherlands, Sweden, Australia, Spain, Italy, France, Belgium and Switzerland (the United Kingdom arm has been merged in Lycamobile).

=== Lyca Radio ===
Launched in 2013, Lyca Radio was born after the acquisition by Lyca of radio frequencies previously operated by Sunrise Radio. Lyca offers two stations, Lyca Radio and Lyca Gold. Both stations have retained the previous format of Sunrise Radio, targeting South Asian communities. This is also in part because of regulatory requirements imposed by Ofcom.

DilSe radio (now Lyca Gold) took over the 1035 AM radio band used by Sunrise's Kismat Radio. Programming includes Bollywood music, and special programming for ramadan.

On 19 May 2023, Lyca Radio was found to be in breach of Ofcom regulations as it failed to deliver local news. According to Lyca, this was due to the departure of its local news journalist and that it had been "very hard to fill the role."

=== Lyca Productions ===
Lyca Productions is an India-based film production venture. Lyca produced India's most expensive film, 2.0, with a budget of US$75 million; it was scheduled for release in November 2018.

Whilst filming Indian 2, three people died and ten were injured when a crane collapsed during filming. The crane operator, Rajan, fled the scene immediately after the accident.

=== LycaTV ===
Lyca TV is an online over-the-top (OTT) ethnic entertainment provider, currently available in 20 countries and in nine languages. The service, launched in 2015, is mainly targeted at major expat communities spread across the world.

=== Lycalotto ===
Lycalotto, launched in March 2017, is a lottery syndicate platform available in the UK and Ireland. Lycalotto offers access to lottery draws from around the world, including those not normally accessible in the region such as the US Powerball.

=== EAP ===
In 2019, EAP Broadcasting Company, one of Sri Lanka's largest entertainment companies, was acquired for $72 million by Lyca Group.

== Controversies ==
The Lyca group of brands has been subject to many past and ongoing investigations relating to their tax affairs, solvency, and regulatory failings. This behaviour is widespread across the group with regulators and governments taking action against the group in Australia, Belgium, France, Germany, India, Ireland, Norway, Spain, and the United Kingdom. These actions have resulted in significant financial penalties and legal convictions.

=== United Kingdom ===
==== Tax evasion ====
Lycamobile has not paid any corporation tax for several years in the United Kingdom though the company put aside £9.5 million to cover "a potential liability of unpaid taxes" including "interest and penalties" in its 2015 accounts. Lycamobile's 2015 accounts were filed seven months late, appearing after Companies House threatened to strike Lycamobile off; such an action would have prevented the company from conducting business in the UK. Lycamobile had previously been threatened with being struck off in 2012; its accounts were filed two years late that year.

In February 2023, Lycamobile's auditors stated they had been "unable to obtain sufficient appropriate audit evidence" regarding loans of £18 million, and there is a further £169 million of complex debt within related companies. Lycamobile faces a £100 million demand over alleged VAT irregularities.

In July 2024, CEO Richard Schäfer and CFO Nikos Paraskevopoulos left the company amid the tax evasion crisis.

==== Solvency ====
In December 2024, following losses of over £25 million during their 2021/22 tax year, combined with conflicts with HM Revenue and Customs on unpaid VAT bills of up to £51 million, Lycamobile announced the risk of redundancy of up to 316 UK staff, bringing the total down to 48, after staff at their City of London headquarters were told the company was facing "pretty serious challenges".

==== Political relationships ====
Lycamobile donated over £2m to the Conservative Party between 2011 and 2016, with Allirajah Subaskaran enjoying a close relationship with both David Cameron and Boris Johnson.

Lycamobile had previously been threatened with being struck off in 2012. Some suggest it is because Lycamobile is a significant donor to the British Conservative Party, having donated £1.3 million since 2011, including £500,000 in 2015.

In 2019, the Labour Party described Johnson as "unfit" to be prime minister, following reports he attended a private dinner with Allirajah in an attempt to gain more funding in the run up to the 2019 General Election.

==== Call charging ====
In 2011, T-Mobile in the United Kingdom charged its customers exclusive of their minutes for calls to United Kingdom Lycamobile/GT Mobile numbers, despite Lycamobile UK being headquartered in London, and using United Kingdom "07"-prefixed numbers issued by Ofcom, in the UK. By contrast, Lycamobile UK did not treat calls to UK T-Mobile customers any differently and calls were charged just as any "07" UK mobile telephone numbers.

==== Related-party loans ====
Across Lycamobile UK Limited and Thames Quay Properties Holdings Limited, Mr Allirajah and his wife have taken a total of £45.240m and £24m respectively in loans at below market rates. In addition to these loans, three employees have also received zero interest loans from WWW Holding Company Limited. A S Premananthan (deputy chairman) has received £3.329m, M A Malique received £3.329m and Chris Tooley, the company's former CEO, received £3.329m. These amounts are as reflected in the audited accounts for the 2020 financial year. As of 4 June 2024, no further accounts have been filed.

Thames Properties Holdings filed its 2022 accounts in March 2024. Despite making a loss of approximately £30 million, the company saw fit to offer a zero interest, unsecured loan of £16 million to Prema Subaskaran.

Lycamobile UK Limited, another UK subsidiary, also reflects loans to the chairman and his wife totalling £45 million and £8.325 million respectively. As a result of these loans, the company's lack of liquidity and the lack of sufficient appropriate audit evidence provided to the auditors, PKF Littlejohn LLP, expressed a disclaimer of opinion on the audited accounts. A disclaimer of opinion is only given in instances where:

- A lack of independence, or material conflict(s) of interest, exist between the auditor and the auditee (SAS No. 26)
- There are significant scope limitations, whether intentional or not, which hinder the auditor's work in obtaining evidence and performing procedures (SAS No. 58);
- There is a substantial doubt about the auditee's ability to continue as a going concern or, in other words, continue operating (SAS No. 59)
- There are significant uncertainties within the auditee (SAS No. 79)

The auditors of Lycatel Services Limited, PKF Littlejohn, provided a qualified opinion on the accounts and state that they were unable to obtain audit evidence relating to the recoverability of the employee loan receivables as it was not possible for management to provide them with sufficient evidence to support the net wealth of the employees to whom the company had advanced loans with an outstanding amount of £2,037,761.

==== Corporate structure ====
The corporate structure of the group came under scrutiny in 2017 when KPMG resigned as auditors for Lycamobile UK Limited, stating that they had difficulties in obtaining audit evidence at this company and for related audits of its related UK companies as a result of the structure and oversight of the company's system of financial reporting.

The 2021 audited report published on the Companies House website states that the company is in dispute with HM Revenue and Customs, in relation to treatment of VAT on certain classes of transactions. A provision has been recorded of £105.5m to reflect the company's current best estimate of the potential exposure as at 31 December 2021, including penalties and interest.

Whilst the Group CEO is listed as Richard Schafer, the most recent annual report published by Companies House for the year ended 31 December 2021 for Lycamobile UK Limited states that "The majority of the cash flows associated with investing and financing activities are ultimately either discretionary and/or with related parties under the control of Mr A Subaskaran".

Subsequent to the release of the 2022 Lycamobile UK accounts, several articles were written about the company. Lyca responded to the article written by ISP Review stating “Lyca has a number of successful private businesses and entities under common control, but it is not a ‘group’. There is no obligation to produce consolidated group accounts, nor to have these audited. As a result, no single auditor has a remit to audit or review related party transactions, which is noted by the auditor of Lycamobile UK as a reason for the disclaimer in the audit report.”

=== International ===
==== Tax evasion and money laundering (France) ====
After a lengthy exposé by Buzzfeed in 2015, the French authorities began an investigation into the group which led to 19 arrests. The police stated that "The charges relate to money laundering of at least €17m and VAT fraud of several million euros". In addition to the arrests, the police also seized €1m in raids on Lycamobile's Paris headquarters and a series of addresses across the city.

The French court ruling was released on 26 October 2023, stating that the company had "knowingly participated in an elaborate money laundering system". The system involved the use of shell companies.

==== Tax evasion (Norway) ====
In January 2023 Okokrim, the Norwegian National Authority for Investigation and Prosecution of Economic and Environmental Crime, sentenced two people to over two years in prison for complicity in a "particularly advanced and reprehensible" tax evasion scheme in connection with the sale of calling cards for Lycatel and Lycamobile in Norway in the period 2010–2016.

==== Tax evasion (Denmark) ====
In February 2016, Lycamobile's subsidiary in Denmark, Lycamobile Denmark, was ordered by the Danish tax authority (SKAT) to pay approximately €9.6 million in unpaid tax. SKAT had assessed that Lycamobile had failed to correctly report and pay VAT on the sale of prepaid SIM cards. Lycamobile appealed the decision, but the Danish National Tax Tribunal upheld the ruling.

Following this, Lycamobile closed its Danish operations and the local subsidiary, Lycamobile Denmark ApS, filed for bankruptcy in 2022. The company subsequently continued to provide services to its Danish customers, effectively transferring the administrative and operational base to its UK entity.

==== Money laundering (India) ====
In May 2023, the Lyca Productions offices were raided by the Indian Enforcement Directorate. The raid resulted in the discovery of "incriminating" evidence reflecting loans and investments made without any due diligence or rationale into the Kallal Group by Pettigo Commercio Internacional LDA, a Portuguese subsidiary of Lycamobile.

==== Tax evasion (Germany) ====
In February 2021 Lycamobile Germany, operating on the Vodafone Network, was found to have not paid over €70m in sales taxes by the Federal Finance Court in Germany. Lycamobile unsuccessfully argued that by the use of a sister company in Ireland, they were able to legally avoid paying the tax.

==== Regulatory failures (Australia) ====
In May 2021, Lycamobile paid A$604,800 after an ACMA investigation found "prolonged and large-scale customer data failures" that compromised public safety. The breaches included:

- Failure to provide accurate customer information for 245,902 subscribers to the Integrated Public Number Database (IPND), which is used by emergency services (Triple Zero).
- Failure to comply with ID check rules for 4,207 prepaid mobile customers when activating services.

In June 2022, the ACMA issued a further penalty of A$186,480 after Lycamobile failed to comply with the court-enforceable undertaking and remedial direction issued in 2021, citing the company's "ongoing disregard for its obligations" by missing deadlines and providing inadequate reports.

Separately, in October 2020, Lycamobile paid A$12,600 after the ACCC issued an infringement notice for alleged false or misleading representations. The company had advertised its unlimited plans on social media, when in fact the plans had a capped data allowance.

==== Freedom of information (Ireland) ====
On 5 May 2016, Lycamobile Ireland Limited was found guilty of the offence of failing to comply with a request for information made by the Commission for Communications Regulation ComReg.

== Data leak ==
On 30 September 2023, Lycamobile suffered a global service disruption in most countries, except the US and Ukraine. The disruption was later identified as a cyber attack. On 6 October, the company released a statement to inform customers about the attack, and the data leak as the result of the attack.
