= Vijay Award for Favourite Director =

Indian film award

The Vijay Award for Favorite Director is an award given by Tamil TV channel STAR Vijay as part of its annual Vijay Awards ceremony honoring excellence in Tamil (Kollywood) films.

== Winners and nominations ==
- 2006 K. S. Ravikumar - Varalaru
- 2007 Prabhu Deva - Pokkiri
  - Shankar - Sivaji
  - Visnhuvardhan - Billa
  - Radha Mohan - Mozhi
  - Ameer - Paruthiveeran
- 2008 Gautham Vasudev Menon - Vaaranam Aayiram
  - Dharani - Kuruvi
  - K. S. Ravikumar - Dasavathaaram
  - M. Sasikumar - Subramaniapuram
  - Venkat Prabhu - Saroja
- 2009 Samuthirakani - Naadodigal
  - Bala - Naan Kadavul
  - K. S. Ravikumar - Aadhavan
  - K. V. Anand - Ayan
  - Susi Ganesan - Kanthaswamy
- 2010 Shankar - Enthiran
  - Gautham Vasudev Menon - Vinnaithaandi Varuvaayaa
  - Hari - Singam
  - Mani Ratnam - Raavanan
  - N. Linguswamy - Paiyaa
- 2011 Venkat Prabhu - Mankatha
  - A. R. Murugadoss - 7 Aum Arivu
  - K. V. Anand - Ko
  - Selvaraghavan - Mayakkam Enna
  - Vetrimaaran - Aadukalam
- 2012 A. R. Murugadoss - Thuppakki
  - N. Lingusamy - Vettai
  - Rajesh - Oru Kal Oru Kannadi
  - S. S. Rajamouli- Naan E
  - Shankar - Nanban
- 2013 Kamal Haasan - Vishwaroopam
  - Bala - Paradesi
  - Hari - Singam II
  - Pandiraj - Kedi Billa Killadi Ranga
  - Visnhuvardhan - Arrambam
- 2014 A. R. Murugadoss - Kaththi
  - Hari - Poojai
  - K. S. Ravikumar - Lingaa
  - Siva - Veeram
  - Sundar C - Aranmanai
- 2017 Atlee - Mersal

== See also ==
- Tamil cinema
- Cinema of India
