= Spyder (film) =

2017 film by A.R. Murugadoss

- Theatrical release poster
- Directed by: A. R. Murugadoss
- Written by: A. R. Murugadoss
- Produced by: N. V. Prasad
- Starring: Mahesh Babu; S.J. Suryah; Rakul Preet Singh
- Cinematography: Santosh Sivan
- Edited by: A. Sreekar Prasad
- Music by: Harris Jayaraj
- Production companies: NVR Cinema LLP; Reliance Entertainment
- Distributed by: Lyca Productions
- Release date: 27 September 2017
- Running time: 145 minutes
- Country: India
- Languages: Telugu; Tamil
- Budget: ₹120 crore
- Box office: est.₹150 crore

Spyder is a 2017 Indian action thriller film written and directed by A. R. Murugadoss and produced by N. V. Prasad. The film was simultaneously shot in Telugu and Tamil languages, and stars Mahesh Babu, S. J. Suryah and Rakul Preet Singh in the lead roles. Murugadoss wrote the Tamil dialogue while the Paruchuri Brothers wrote the Telugu version. The film was edited by A. Sreekar Prasad, with cinematography by Santosh Sivan and music by Harris Jayaraj.

This film marks the Tamil debut of Babu, Originally, the film was rumoured to be titled Abhimanyudu and Sambhavami, before the official title was finalised as Spyder on 18 March 2017. The film began production in July 2016, followed by the commencement of principal photography. Shooting mainly took place in Chennai, with some portions in and around Hyderabad and Vizag, while the songs were filmed overseas, before wrapping up in August 2017.

Spyder was released theatrically worldwide on 27 September 2017. The film received mixed reviews from critics and was a box office bomb. It grossed ₹92– ₹150 crore against a budget of ₹120 crore.

== Plot ==
Shiva is an IB officer who develops a program to spy on people's calls and messages in order to help them. On the night of 16 March, Shiva listens to Charlie (Shalini in the Tamil version) talk about her wish of getting 98% in her exams, up from 96%, to get a US scholarship with her friend. In order to do that, she decides to go on a blind date with a guy believing it will help her concentrate on her studies. Shiva follows her and both start to fall for each other, but Shiva finds it hard to focus on his love life because of his job. On the night of 28 April, Shiva listens to a young girl asking her friend for help as she is alone in her house and scared, due to a power outage at her house despite everyone else on her street having power.

Alarmed, Shiva sends his constable friend Renuka to the girl's address to help her. However, the next day news headlines report about the gruesome death of the two women. Shiva visits the crime scene and resigns from the IB due to guilt, but his father encourages him to find the killer. Shiva sets out to check the girl's chats and whereabouts, where he finds out that a guy followed her to a café. Through Facebook, Shiva is able to track down another person who knew the stalker. With the provided information, he travels to the village where the stalker grew up and begins his search. From an elderly villager, Shiva finally learns about the man's past.

Past: Bhairavudu (Sudalai in the Tamil version) lives with his mother, father and younger brother at a cemetery. His father performs funeral rites for the dead to take care of his family, but this occupation leads to Bhairavudu suffering from S.P.D., where he develops an unusual desire to kill victims and watch their families grieve. One day, a child witnesses him killing someone and reveals this to the other villagers. An infuriated mob decides to burn down Bhairavudu's house, killing his parents. Bhairavudu leaves enraged the village to continue his killing spree, along with his younger brother.

Present: Shiva catches Bhairavudu and interrogates him in a dense hideout, but learns that he is actually Bhairavudu's brother. Bhairavudu goes on live television with a mask covering his face and reveals he has killed 23 people and hidden their corpses in 23 pillars of a metro bridge, and threatens the citizens to leave his brother unscathed. He also reveals that he plans to destroy a hospital. Shiva kills Bhairavudu's brother in front of the victims' families, including an enraged Bhairavudu, who is hiding in the crowd. An upset Bhairavudu plans to kill Shiva's family, but Shiva finds out when his mother calls him and tells him she is scared because there is no electricity at their house, just as the girl victim had described earlier. With the help of his team, Shiva is able to save his family.

Shiva becomes Bhairavudu's next target, and he tries to kill Shiva on his way home, with Shiva ending up impaled on a truck. Shiva slowly recovers and resumes the search for Bhairavudu, as he had shot him before he fell unconscious. He deduces that Bhairavudu has hidden himself in a house where he can heal, but has imprisoned the owners. Through the use of technology and information from local women, Shiva finds Bhairavudu and arrests him, but Bhairavudu tells him that he has already planned a rock fall in the city. Shiva manages to stop the big rock while Bhairavudu escapes from police custody and continues with his plan to destroy a hospital.

Charlie learns about the targeted hospital, but refuses to tell Shiva due to a misunderstanding. Shiva tracks down her taxi, where she tells him about the hospital. He rushes to the hospital and starts to evacuate the people inside, trying to save as many as he can, but is unable to save some patients in time, which leaves him heartbroken. Bhairavudu sees Shiva's grief and becomes delighted. Shiva spots Bhairavudu and becomes enraged. The two of them fight, with Shiva overpowering and killing Bhairavudu .

In the aftermath, Shiva tells the media about the importance of showing humanity and leaves with Charlie, who was worried about him.

== Cast ==
- Mahesh Babu as G. Shiva Kumar “Shiva”, an IB officer who develops a program to spy on people's calls and messages in order to help them
- S. J. Suryah as Bhairavudu (Telugu) / Sudalai (Tamil)
  - Master Sanjay as a young Bhairavudu (Telugu) / Sudalai (Tamil)
- Rakul Preet Singh as Charlie (Telugu) / Shalini (Tamil), Shiva's love interest
- Bharath as Bhairavudu's (Telugu) / Sudalai's (Tamil) brother
- Priyadarshi as Vinay (Telugu) / Madhu (Tamil)
- RJ Balaji as Madhu (Telugu) / Vinay (Tamil)
- Dheepa Ramanujam as Bhuvaneshwari, Shiva's mother
- Jayaprakash as Ramaswamy, Shiva's father
- Kani Kusruti as Varalakshmi, Bhairavudu's (Telugu) / Sudalai's (Tamil) mother (younger portions only)
- Rahul Verma Rajput as Shiva's Brother
- Sayaji Shinde as DGP Chandrasekhar
- Nagineedu as Commissioner Gajapathi
- Himaja as Renuka
- Shaji Chen as IB Head Matthews
- Hareesh Peradi as CBI Head officer
- Ajay Rathnam as Inspector Gokulnath
- Sendrayan as Rogue
- Sampath Ram as Rowdy
- George Maryan as Suresh, the man whose family is kidnapped by Sudalai (Tamil)
- R. S. G. Chelladurai as Villager (Tamil)

== Production ==
=== Development ===
Originally, Mahesh Babu planned to make his direct debut in Tamil, after the dubbed Tamil version of Srimanthudu (2015), titled Selvandhan, received a decent response from audiences. After opening that the script had the potential to be commercially successful in both languages without making many changes, Babu accepted the proposal of a Telugu-Tamil film.

In November 2015, Babu announced his next project would be a Tamil-Telugu bilingual film directed by A. R. Murugadoss. It marks Babu's first direct Tamil debut, as well as Murugadoss' return to the Telugu cinema industry, a decade after his last film Stalin (2006) starring Chiranjeevi. Santhosh Sivan, worked with Murugadoss in Thuppakki (2012), as the cinematographer, and Harris Jayaraj, who scored music for Murugadoss' earlier films, Ghajini, 7 Aum Arivu and Thuppakki, as composer.

It was reported that Babu would play the role of a police officer in the film, although other reports claimed that Babu would play the role of a RAW agent. In December 2016 the filmmakers announced the tentative title of the film as Sambhavami, which received a mixed response from fans. On 18 March 2017, the film's title was revealed to be Spyder.

=== Casting ===
In March 2016, Parineeti Chopra was initially signed to play the lead actress and make her debut in South Indian cinema. However, her unavailability after she was finalised in Takadum, starring Sushant Singh Rajput, meant that the creators approached Rakul Preet Singh for the leading role. S. J. Suryah was hired to play a negative role for the first time after featuring in lead roles, marking his second collaboration with Mahesh Babu after directing him in Naani (2004). Murugadoss was a former assistant of S. J. Suryah in the films Vaalee and Kushi. Tamil actor RJ Balaji signed onto the film in January 2017, playing the role of Shiva's friend. In December 2016, Bharath was signed on to play a negative role.

Twin stunt choreographers Anbariv were eventually roped into the film to choreograph action sequences, although Peter Hein was also roped into the film. R. C. Kamalakannan, who supervised visual effects for Baahubali 2: The Conclusion (2017), was roped in as part of the technical crew. Kamalakannan claimed that the film has heavy visual effects, and a Russian principal studio was working on the film.

=== Filming ===
The film's principal photography commenced on 29 July 2016. Rakul Preet Singh joined the set in August 2016, and the creators started a fresh shooting schedule, focusing on the romantic scene between Singh and Babu. The second schedule of the film took place in mid-September 2016, in Pune and Bangalore, after the Chennai schedule was wrapped up. On 21 October 2016, Singh received a minor injury on her left hand while shooting for an action episode, although the actress, who was advised to rest for a day, resumed shooting immediately. The third schedule was kickstarted in Hyderabad in November 2016, with filming taking place for three weeks. After wrapping up the shoot on 22 November, the team headed to Ahmedabad and Surat for the fourth schedule. Babu extensively shot the schedule for two weeks. After a brief break, the makers resumed the shoot in Mumbai in January 2017, where the introductory scenes featuring Babu were shot. During March 2017, Chiranjeevi made a visit to the film sets. More filming occurred in Vietnam between late March and early May. Some of the action scenes were shot there with local stunt artists, such as the rollercoaster chase.

The final schedule of the film was expected to take place on 20 April 2017 in Hyderabad, although shooting started on 4 May 2017. Art director Rupin Suchak revealed to a source that 98% of the film was shot in Chennai, with the backdrop being changed to Hyderabad through computer graphics for the Telugu version. Babu did the film's stunts by himself without using body doubles. In some of the more intense scenes, he continued to perform his own stunts despite sustaining various injuries, leading to a physiotherapist being posted on set permanently for him, and eventually he "couldn’t get up for a week after the shooting schedule". On 16 May 2017, a source claimed that the makers planned for a climax sequence with high-octane action scenes, instead of a normal climax, which was originally scheduled to be shot at the NIMS Hospital in Bibnagar, Hyderabad.

The filming was planned to be completed by 2 June 2017, but the final schedule was started on 13 June, where minor dialogue portions were filmed, with shooting to last for only four days. In July 2017, the makers filmed a song sequence in Hyderabad for ten days. The last song of the film was shot abroad on 2 August, and the principal shoot was wrapped following its completion.

== Music ==
The film's soundtrack is composed by Harris Jayaraj, with lyrics for the Tamil version was written by Madhan Karky. Initially, Karky, was expected to pen the songs for its Telugu-dubbed version, thus marking his debut in the Telugu industry, however, Ramajogayya Sastry penned the songs in Telugu. The film featured six songs in Telugu, and five in Tamil version. Two songs—"Boom Boom" and "Haali Haali" (in Tamil as "Aali Aali") were released as singles on 2 August and 4 September 2017, while the album was released through Zee Music Company on 9 September 2017. The release coincided with an event for the Tamil version at Kalaivanar Arangam in Chennai.

== Release ==
During the film's pre-production phase, it was announced that the film would be released on 23 June 2017. The release was pushed to 10 August 2017 due to production delays. The film was again postponed to mid-September and then to Dusherra, due to delays in the film's shooting. The makers finally announced that the film would be released on 27 September 2017. Following the huge reception for the Baahubali franchise, Spyder was also planned to have a simultaneous release in Telugu and Tamil, and also with a Malayalam-dubbed version of the same name. The film was sent to the Central Board of Film Certification for censor formalities on 19 September 2017, where the film received a "U/A" certification and a runtime of 145 minutes.

Spyder was released in the US a day ahead of its release in Indian theatres on 26 September. The film was released in more than 800 screens in the country, thus becoming the widest release for a Telugu film after Baahubali 2: The Conclusion. The film was also speculated to have a dubbed release in Arabic, and was scheduled to be released in the Gulf countries. Hein bought the Vietnamese dubbing rights of the film and released it in Vietnam.

=== Distribution ===
The Tamil Nadu theatrical rights for the film were acquired by Lyca Productions for ₹18 crore. Andhra Pradesh and Telangana distribution rights were secured by the production house itself, except for the Nizam rights which were acquired by Dil Raju for ₹24 crore. The overseas distribution rights were sold to Atmus Entertainment for ₹22.5 crore. The ceded rights were sold for ₹12 crore and Vizag rights were sold for ₹8.1 crore. The film earned ₹6 crore in the East and ₹4.5 crore in the West, ₹5.4 crore in Krishna, ₹7.2 crore in Guntur and ₹3.2 crore in Nellore, for a total of ₹70.4 crore from the Telugu States. The film's Karnataka theatrical rights were sold to Goldie Films for ₹10.8 crore, Kerala theatrical rights were sold for ₹1.3 crore, and the Rest Of India rights were sold for ₹1 crore. The film earned ₹124 crore from worldwide theatrical sales alone. Including satellite rights for the Telugu & Hindi versions, which were sold for ₹25 crore, Tamil & Malayalam versions which were sold for ₹6.5 crore, and audio rights which were sold for ₹1.5 crore, the film had a total intake of ₹157 crore before its release.

=== Marketing ===
The film's first poster was initially scheduled to release on 29 March 2017, but was eventually released on 12 April. The poster gave a glimpse of a buff and ripped Babu with a gun in his hand. The poster received an overwhelming response from fans. The team launched an official Facebook and Twitter page and an official YouTube channel for the film's promotions. Initially, the makers wanted to release the first glimpse of the film on 31 May 2017, coinciding with actor Krishna's birthday, the father of Mahesh. But it was postponed due to the demise of veteran filmmaker Dasari Narayana Rao. The teaser was launched on 1 June at midnight to positive reviews from fans.

On 9 August 2017, the makers released the official teaser of the film coinciding with the actor's birthday. The teaser crossed 8.6 million views within 48 hours of its release. The official trailer of the film was released on 15 September 2017, during the pre-release event held at Shilpakala Vedika in Hyderabad. The trailer received outstanding reviews, and it crossed 2 million views within a few hours. Before the release of the film, Mahesh Babu revealed that the robotic spider featured in the film's teaser, will not feature in the film as it has no role for it. Mahesh announced it, that he doesn't want his fans to be disappointed.

=== Home media ===
The satellite rights of the film were acquired by Zee Network (for Telugu and Hindi versions) and Sun TV Network (for Tamil and Malayalam versions) for a record sum of ₹30.5 crore. The film's Telugu version premiered on Zee Telugu on 14 January 2018, coinciding with Sankranthi, and registered a TRP rating of 6.7. The film's television premiere took place on 18 February 2018. The film was also dubbed in Hindi and premiered directly on Zee Cinema on 17 June 2018.

== Reception ==
Spyder received mixed reviews from critics and audiences, who praised the cast performances (particularly Suryah and Mahesh Babu), action sequences and direction, but criticised its screenwriting and pace.

=== Critical reception ===
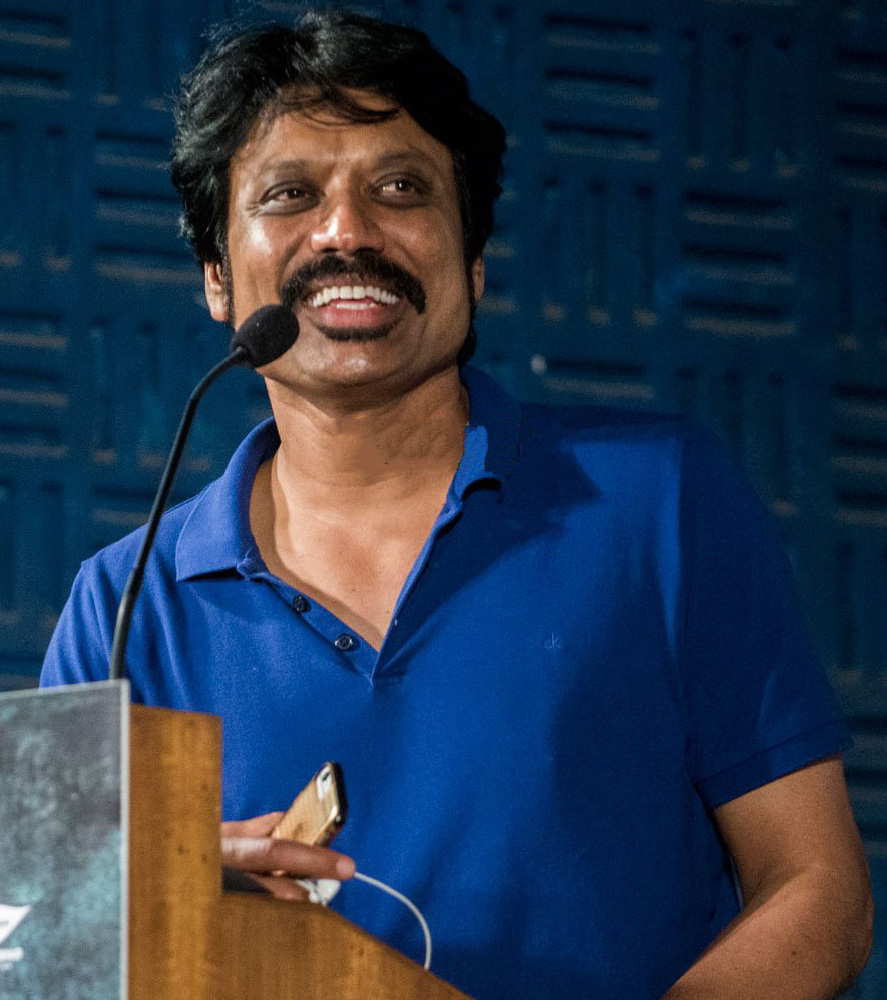
S. J. Surya received praise for his performance in Spyder

On the review aggregator website Rotten Tomatoes, 52% of 5 critics' reviews are positive, with an average rating of 4.5/10.

==== Telugu version ====
Sridhar Adivi from The Times of India gave 2.5/5 stars, stating that "The conflict between the hero and the villain seems like a safe enough plot for a potboiler or a spy film; however, Murugadoss’ writing doesn't manage to give you the chills or thrills the promos promised to." Y. Sunita Chowdary of The Hindu stated that "Spyder starts off well but the director's imagination goes overboard only to turn a purpose ridden plot into a piece of travesty."

Hemanth Kumar of Firstpost gave the film 3.5/5 stars, stating "Spyder is also a true blue action thriller and it stays true to the genre. This isn't a Mahesh Babu's film alone and it doesn't pander to our expectations from his action dramas. And to see him step into the shoes of a character which doesn't dominate the film is also why Spyder has a very different tone from the very beginning." Karthik Keramalu of Hindustan Times gave 2/5 stars and stated: "Spyder is not great but it’s definitely watchable for Mahesh Babu, Suryah and the touching humanistic angle."

==== Tamil version ====
M. Suganth of The Times of India gave 2/5 stars and wrote "The writing lets Spyder down entirely after a point and, unlike Thuppakki (which was also about a man trying to save and a man trying to destroy), what should have been an edge-of-the-seat cat-and-mouse game between good and evil turns into a movie that cannot decide between wanting to be a crackling thriller and an anything-goes masala movie." S. Srivatsan of India Today gave 2/5 stars and summarised it as "The core of Spyder seems to have been written for [a] Telugu audience. Even for them, Spyder isn't a satisfying star vehicle. Or Maybe Spyder isn't what Murugadoss imagined on paper. Because, some scenes, even on paper, appear to be pompous. Consider the scene from the second half of 7 Aum Arivu and you'll understand better."

Baradwaj Rangan of Film Companion wrote "this film is a pretty decent god-vs-demon tale, with a solid hero and a spectacular villain" in his review. Subhash K. Jha of NDTV gave 4/5 stars and stated "Murugadoss takes a familiar bad-guy-good-guy plot and converts it into a compelling cat-and-mouse game shot in colours and favours that suggest life in times of impending death."

=== Box-office ===
On its opening day, the film saw more than 55% occupancy in theatres and managed to collect ₹33 crore gross on its first day at the global box-office. The film grossed ₹13.4 crore on the first day of its release, with a share of ₹5.3 crore in Andhra Pradesh and Telangana and it is said to have collected ₹1.30 crore in two days in Chennai alone. The film had crossed ₹35 crore within three days, and it collected ₹45 crore within five days. In twelve days it collected ₹55 crore gross globally. At the US box office the film collected US$ 1 million in seven days, becoming the fifth film of the actor to do so.

=== Accolades ===
Award	Year of Ceremony	Category	Recipient(s) and nominee(s)	Result	Ref
Filmfare Awards South-Telugu cinema	2018	Best Supporting Actor	S. J. Suryah	Nominated	
South India International Movie Awards	2018	Best Actor in a Negative Role	S. J. Suryah	Nominated	

== See also ==
- List of multilingual Indian films
- Pan-Indian film
- List of longest films in India
