= Lyca Productions =

Indian film studio founded in 2014

- Type: Private
- Industry: Entertainment
- Founded: 2014; 12 years ago in Chennai, India
- Founder: Subaskaran Allirajah
- Headquarters: Chennai, India
- Key people: G.K.M. Tamil Kumaran
- Products: Films
- Parent: Lycamobile
- Website: lycaproductions.in

Lyca Productions (/laɪkɑː/) is an Indian entertainment company founded by Subaskaran Allirajah in 2014. Subaskaran Allirajah is a British citizen of Sri Lanka Tamil ethnicity. A subsidiary of Lycamobile (part of the Lyca Group), the studio has been involved in the production and distribution of Tamil, Hindi, Telugu, Malayalam, and Sinhala films. It has produced some of Tamil cinema's most expensive films, including 2.0 (2018), Ponniyin Selvan: I (2022), and Ponniyin Selvan: II (2023) and L2: Empuraan (2025).

== History ==
Pirivom Santhippom (2008) was the first film produced by A. Subhaskaran under Gnanam films. Lyca Productions chose to collaborate with Ayngaran International to produce and signed on AR Murugadoss and Vijay to be a part of their debut project. A social drama tackling the issue of farmers committing suicide due to corporate encroachment, Kaththi was shot throughout early 2014 with Samantha and Neil Nitin Mukesh signed on for other pivotal roles. As the film announced its release plans, several pro-Tamil pressure groups demanded all references to Lyca Productions to be removed from the title and other publicity material. The groups felt it was unacceptable that a business house, allegedly reported to be connected to Sri Lankan President Mahinda Rajapaksa, would be allowed to produce a Tamil movie in Tamil Nadu when the Tamil Nadu Assembly, citing human rights violations during the civil war in the island nation, had already passed a resolution seeking severance of business ties with Sri Lanka. Unable to reach a compromise with the pressure groups, and fearing a boycott and violence, Lyca Productions chose to remove its name from the copies released in India. Kaththi consequently managed to release in October 2014 to positive reviews, with Rediff.com stating that the film "entertains with a message", while Sify.com similarly stated that it was a "well made entertainer with a powerful message". The film became a very profitable venture at the box office for Lyca Productions, grossing over 100 crore rupees within two weeks of release.

In late 2015, Lyca Productions agreed a deal with Dhanush for the worldwide distribution rights of two of his productions, Naanum Rowdydhaan (2015) and Visaranai (2016). The movie was also met with protests, though Naanum Rowdydhaan released without any problems and also became a profitable venture for the studio. Also throughout 2015, Lyca Productions worked on the pre-production of 2.0, a sequel to Shankar's earlier Enthiran (2010), and signed on Rajinikanth and Amy Jackson to feature in key roles. Believed to be the most expensive Indian production of all time, the team also negotiated for several months with Arnold Schwarzenegger for a role in the film, but eventually did not sign him. The studio also launched another film titled Enakku Innoru Per Irukku with G. V. Prakash Kumar in the lead role during December 2015.

== Produced films ==
Key
†	Denotes films that have not yet been released

List of films produced by Lyca Productions
Year	Title	Language	Director	Cast	Ref.
2014	Kaththi	Tamil	A. R. Murugadoss	Vijay, Samantha, Neil Nitin Mukesh	
2016	Enakku Innoru Per Irukku	Tamil	Sam Anton	G. V. Prakash Kumar, Anandhi, Saravanan	
2017	Khaidi No. 150	Telugu	V. V. Vinayak	Chiranjeevi, Kajal Aggarwal, Tarun Arora	
2017	Yaman	Tamil	Jeeva Shankar	Vijay Antony, Miya, Thiagarajan	
2017	Ippadai Vellum	Tamil	Gaurav Narayanan	Udhayanidhi Stalin, Manjima Mohan, Daniel Balaji	
2018	Diya	Tamil	A. L. Vijay	Sai Pallavi, Naga Shourya, RJ Balaji	
2018	Kolamaavu Kokila	Tamil	Nelson Dilipkumar	Nayanthara, Yogi Babu, Saranya	
2018	Chekka Chivantha Vaanam	Tamil	Mani Ratnam	Arvind Swami, STR, Vijay Sethupathi, Arun Vijay	
2018	Vada Chennai	Tamil	Vetrimaaran	Dhanush, Andrea Jeremiah, Aishwarya Rajesh	
2018	2.0	Tamil	S. Shankar	Rajinikanth, Akshay Kumar, Amy Jackson	
2019	Vantha Rajavathaan Varuven	Tamil	Sundar C	STR, Megha Akash, Catherine Tresa	
2019	Kaappaan	Tamil	K. V. Anand	Mohanlal, Suriya, Arya, Sayyeshaa	
2020	Darbar	Tamil	A. R. Murugadoss	Rajinikanth, Nayanthara, Sunil Shetty	
2020	Mafia: Chapter 1	Tamil	Karthick Naren	Arun Vijay, Priya Bhavani Shankar, Prasanna	
2022	Don	Tamil	Cibi Chakaravarthi	Sivakarthikeyan, S. J. Suryah, Priyanka Mohan	
2022	Panni Kutty	Tamil	Anucharan Murugaiyan	Yogi Babu, Karunakaran	
2022	Good Luck Jerry	Hindi	Sidharth Sengupta	Janhvi Kapoor	
2022	Ponniyin Selvan: I	Tamil	Mani Ratnam	Vikram, Karthi, Aishwarya Rai Bachchan, Jayam Ravi, Trisha, Jayaram, Aishwarya Lekshmi, Sobhita Dhulipala, Vikram Prabhu	
2022	Ram Setu	Hindi	Abhishek Sharma	Akshay Kumar	
2022	Pattathu Arasan	Tamil	A. Sarkunam	Atharvaa, Rajkiran	
2022	Naai Sekar Returns	Tamil	Suraj	Vadivelu	
2022	Raangi	Tamil	M. Saravanan	Trisha, Anaswara Rajan	
2023	Thiruvin Kural	Tamil	Harish Prabhu	Arulnithi, Bharathiraja, Aathmika	
2023	Ponniyin Selvan: II	Tamil	Mani Ratnam	Vikram, Karthi, Aishwarya Rai Bachchan, Jayam Ravi, Trisha, Jayaram, Aishwarya Lekshmi, Sobhita Dhulipala, Vikram Prabhu	
2023	Theera Kaadhal	Tamil	Rohin Venkatesan	Jai, Aishwarya Rajesh, Sshivada	
2023	Chandramukhi 2	Tamil	P. Vasu	Raghava Lawrence, Kangana Ranaut, Vadivelu	
2024	Mission: Chapter 1	Tamil	A. L. Vijay	Arun Vijay, Amy Jackson, Nimisha Sajayan	
2024	Lal Salaam	Tamil	Aishwarya Rajinikanth	Rajinikanth, Vishnu Vishal, Vikranth	
2024	Indian 2	Tamil	S. Shankar	Kamal Haasan, Siddharth SJ Surya, Kajal Aggarval	
2024	Vettaiyan	Tamil	T. J. Gnanavel	Rajinikanth, Fahadh Faasil, Amitabh Bachchan, Manju Warrier, Rana Daggubati, Ritika Singh, Dushara Vijayan	
2025	Rani	Sinhala	Asoka Handagama	Swarna Mallawarachchi, Rehan Amaratunga, Sanath Gunathilake, Sajitha Anthony, Bimal Jayakody, Ashan Dias, Mayura Kanchana, Rithika Kodithuvakku	
2025	Vidaamuyarchi	Tamil	Magizh Thirumeni	Ajith Kumar, Arjun, Trisha Krishnan, Regina Cassandra, Aarav	
2025	L2: Empuraan	Malayalam	Prithviraj Sukumaran	Mohanlal, Prithviraj Sukumaran, Tovino Thomas, Indrajith Sukumaran, Manju Warrier	
2025	Devi Kusumasana	Sinhala	Jayantha Chandrasiri	Hemal Ranasinghe, Udari Warnakulasooriya, Sriyantha Mendis	
2025	Lockdown	Tamil	AR Jeeva	Anupama Parameswaran, Charle, Nirosha	
2026	Parimala and Co	Tamil	Pandiraaj	Jayaram, Urvashi, Mysskin	
2026	Sigma	Tamil	Jason Sanjay	Sundeep Kishan	
2027	Inji Vellam †	Tamil	Mani Ratnam	Vijay Sethupathi, Sai Pallavi	
2027	Indian 3 †	Tamil	S. Shankar	Kamal Haasan, Kajal Aggarwal, Siddharth, Rakul Preet Singh, Priya Bhavani Shankar, Bobby Simha, S. J. Suryah	

== Distributed films ==
In addition to the films produced by Lyca Productions since 2014, the following filmsfrom other banners were distributed by the company:

†	Denotes films that have not yet been released

Year	Title	Language	Director	Cast	Synopsis	Ref.
2015	Naanum Rowdy Dhaan	Tamil	Vignesh Shivan	Vijay Sethupathi, Nayanthara, RJ Balaji and Radhika Sarathkumar	Pandiyan, a policeman's son, falls in love with Kadhambari, a girl with hearing impairment. She agrees to have a relationship with him only if he helps her kill a gangster who murdered her parents.	
2016	Visaranai	Tamil	Vetrimaaran	Dinesh, Samuthirakani, Anandhi and Aadukalam Murugadoss	Four labourers are tortured by the police to confess to a theft they have not committed. Just when they feel relieved after being saved by an honest policeman, they find that the worst is yet to come.	
2016	Vetrivel	Tamil	Vasantha Mani	Sasikumar, Miya, Prabhu and Nikhila Vimal	In a bid to help his younger brother unite with the girl he loves, Vetrivel and his friends decide to kidnap her. Things take an ugly turn when their plan goes wrong and results in messy situations.	
2017	Spyder	Tamil	A. R. Murugadoss	Mahesh Babu, Rakul Preet Singh and S. J. Surya	Shiva, an intelligence officer, develops a phone software that helps him track those in need of help. He sets out to save the people of Hyderabad when he realises that a serial killer is on the loose.	
2018	Kaala	Tamil	Pa. Ranjith	Rajinikanth, Nana Patekar, Eswari Rao, Samuthirakani and Huma Qureshi	Karikaalan consistently fights to keep the people of Dharavi, a slum in Mumbai, safe from the clutches of mighty politicians and the land mafia don, Hari Dhadha.	
2018	Irumbu Thirai	Tamil	P. S. Mithran	Vishal, Arjun and Samantha Ruth Prabhu	A military officer borrows money from a bank using fake papers for his sister's marriage. However, when the money goes missing from his account, he begins an investigation that leads him to a hacker.	
2018	Sandakozhi 2	Tamil	N. Linguswamy	Vishal, Keerthy Suresh, Rajkiran and Varalaxmi Sarathkumar	Balu returns from New York and sets out to protect his family from an evil-minded man. Complications further arise as he falls in love with a woman, who reminds him of his ex-lover.	
2021	Pushpa: The Rise	Tamil dubbed	Sukumar	Allu Arjun, Rashmika Mandanna, Fahadh Faasil, Jagadeesh Prathap Bandari, Rao Ramesh and Anasuya Bharadwaj	Violence erupts between red sandalwood smugglers and the police charged with bringing down their organisation in the Seshachalam Hills of Andhra Pradesh state.	
2022	RRR	Tamil dubbed	S. S. Rajamouli	N. T. Rama Rao Jr., Ram Charan, Ajay Devgn, Alia Bhatt, Shriya Saran, Olivia Morris, Samuthirakani, Alison Doody and Ray Stevenson	A tale of two legendary revolutionaries and their journey far away from home. After their journey they return home to start fighting back against British colonialists in the 1920s.	
2022	Sita Ramam	Tamil dubbed	Hanu Raghavapudi	Dulquer Salmaan, Mrunal Thakur, Rashmika Mandanna and Sumanth	To not get rusticated, a rebellious student leaves to India to fulfill her dead grandfather's wish, to deliver a letter the visit leads her to a love story between an orphan Indian Army soldier and a woman unbeknownst to him a rich heiress in the 60s. Will she deliver the letter to her?	
2022	Baba (Re-release)	Tamil	Suresh Krissna	Rajinikanth, Manisha Koirala and Goundamani	The film's story is about a carefree young non-believer of supreme power, Baba, who is a reincarnation of a great saint from the Himalayas.	
2023	Thunivu	Tamil	H. Vinoth	Ajith Kumar	Radha, a dreaded gangster, and his men plot to rob "Your Bank", one of the biggest privately owned bank in Chennai, only to realise that another gang led a by mysterious person, nicknamed Dark Devil, has already hijacked the bank. The police, led by DGP Dayalan, is trying to figure out a way to capture Dark Devil, only to realize that his motive is to actually expose the privately owned banks involved in financial fraud.	
2024	Captain Miller	Tamil	Arun Matheswaran	Dhanush, Priyanka Mohan, Shivarajkumar	Set in pre-Independence era, the British are looking for ’Miller’ , a British soldier turned vigilante. The villagers are tired of the Analeesan's antics and ask him to stay away from them. Analeesan, who has become ‘Miller’ after joining the British army, has gone rouge.	

== Lyca Music ==
Year	Title	Language	Music Director
2016	Enakku Innoru Per Irukku	Tamil	G. V. Prakash Kumar
2017	Ippadai Vellum	Tamil	D. Imman
2018	Yaman	Tamil	Vijay Antony
2018	Diya	Tamil	Sam C. S.
2018	2.0	Tamil	A. R. Rahman

== See also ==
- Tamil Cinema
- Lycamobile
- Lyca Kovai Kings
