= A. R. Murugadoss =

Indian filmmaker (born 1974)

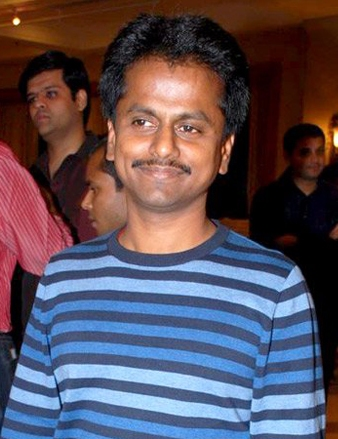
- Murugadoss in 2009
- Born: Murugadas Arunachalam; 25 September 1974 (age 52); Kallakurichi, Tamil Nadu, India
- Occupations: Film director; Screenwriter; Film producer
- Years active: 1997–present
- Spouse: Ramya (m. 2005)
- Children: 2
- Relatives: Dileepan (brother)

Murugadas Arunachalam (born 25 September 1974), known professionally as A. R. Murugadoss, is an Indian film director, screenwriter and film producer who predominantly works in the Tamil film industry. He is best known for directing action films mainly on social issues. In addition, he has worked in Telugu films and Hindi films. Murugadoss won the Filmfare Award for Best Director for his 2014 Tamil action drama Kaththi.

Murugadoss' first break in the film industry was as an assistant director of Ratchagan (1997). He then worked with S. J. Surya for the film Kushi (2000) before directing his first film, Dheena (2001). His first Bollywood film was Ghajini (2008), a Hindi remake of his Tamil film of the same name. It became the first Bollywood film to gross over ₹100 crore (US$10 million) domestically. In 2012, he directed the action thriller Thuppakki, starring Vijay, which became the second Tamil film to gross ₹100 crore at the domestic box office alone. He worked with Vijay again with the box office hits Kaththi (2014) and Sarkar (2018).

== Personal life ==
Murugadoss was born in Kallakurichi, Tamil Nadu. The initials "AR" refer to his father's name Arunachalam and were added after Murugadoss signed his first film, Dheena(2001). Murugadoss currently resides in Virugambakkam, Chennai. Murugadoss had his schooling at the Government Higher Secondary School and studied BA in Bishop Heber College, Tiruchirapalli. His cousin, Dileepan made his acting debut with Vathikuchi, which is Murugadoss' production venture.

== Career ==
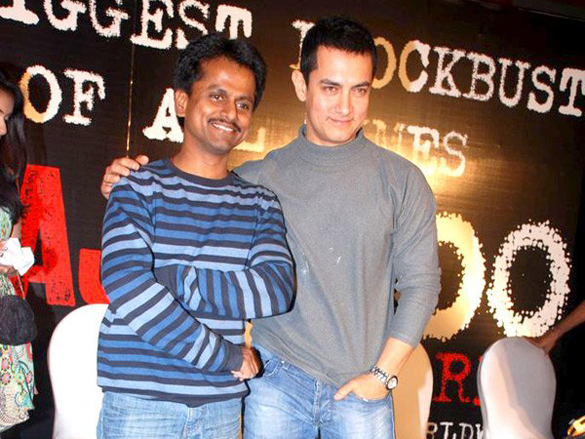
Murugadoss with Aamir Khan in 2009

During his college days, Murugadoss was active in cultural events, particularly in mimicry and drawing. He subsequently became a cinephile watching up to seven films a week in his hometown and started writing jokes as well. After Ananda Vikatan published them, Murugadoss began to think of becoming a story writer. At Bharathidasan University he started to write sketch comedies and acted in them. After college he tried to join the Madras Film Institute, but was rejected. Nevertheless, Murugadoss stayed in Chennai in multiple functions. First, he became an assistant writer of P. Kalaimani and wrote dialogues for the Tamil film Madurai Meenakshi. He became assistant director of Ratchagan (1997) for half of the film and continued as assistant script director for the Telugu film Kalisundam Raa. Murugadoss then worked with S. J. Surya for the film Kushi (2000).

S. J. Suryah recommended Murugadoss to Ajith Kumar for directing his debut film, Dheena. His next films were Ramana, Ghajini, and Stalin.

In 2003, he contemplated making a film titled Varathan with Vikram in the lead role for producer Oscar Ravichandran, but later moved on to other projects.

His fifth film was Ghajini, which was a Hindi remake of his same-titled 2005 film and marked his Bollywood debut. It released in 2008 and became the first Bollywood film to gross over ₹100 crore domestically. His next Tamil film 7 Aum Arivu, was released in 2011. Murugadoss signed a deal with Fox Star Studios to produce two Tamil films.

In 2012, he directed the action thriller Thuppakki, starring Vijay and produced by S. Dhanu released in 2012 to mostly positive reviews and became the second Tamil film to enter the ₹100 crore club domestically alone after Enthiran. Thuppakki collected over ₹180 crores end of its run as reported by the producer. He also directed the Hindi remake of the film, Holiday: A Soldier Is Never Off Duty. In 2014, he was the writer and producer for the fantasy film Maan Karate starring Sivakarthikeyan which was directed by his former assistant Thirukumaran.

In 2014, he directed the action drama Kaththi starring Vijay and produced by Lyca Productions released in 2014 and emerged as one of the top-grossing films in Kollywood for 2014, collecting an estimated ₹131 crores. In 2016, he directed Akira starring Sonakshi Sinha. It is a remake of the Tamil film Mouna Guru. Then, he directed Spyder starring Mahesh Babu and Rakul Preet Singh. He joined with Vijay once again for the movie Sarkar which is produced by Sun Pictures Kalanithi Maran which released in 2018 for the Diwali. It was released in over 3000 screens around the world. The next, his film Darbar starring Rajinikanth was released in 2020.

After five years, Murugadoss made his directorial comeback in 2025 with two films – Sikandar with Salman Khan, and Madharaasi with Sivakarthikeyan.

On 1 February 2026, it was reported that filmmaker A. R. Murugadoss would direct a high-profile pan-Indian action thriller featuring Sunny Deol and Jyotika in the lead roles, marking the first collaboration between the two actors.

== Filmography ==
Key
†	Denotes films that have not yet been released

=== As director ===
Year	Film	Language	Notes
2001	Dheena	Tamil	
2002	Ramanaa	Tamil	
2005	Ghajini	Tamil	
2006	Stalin	Telugu	
2008	Ghajini	Hindi	A remake of his Ghajini (2005)
2011	7 Aum Arivu	Tamil	
2012	Thuppakki	Tamil	
2014	Holiday: A Soldier Is Never Off Duty	Hindi	A remake of his Thuppakki (2012)
2014	Kaththi	Tamil	
2016	Akira	Hindi	A remake of Mouna Guru (2011)
2017	Spyder	Telugu; Tamil	Bilingual film
2018	Sarkar	Tamil	
2020	Darbar	Tamil	
2025	Sikandar	Hindi	
2025	Madharaasi	Tamil	

=== As producer ===
Year	Film	Notes
2011	Engaeyum Eppothum	
2013	Vathikuchi	
2013	Raja Rani	
2014	Maan Karate	
2015	10 Endrathukulla	
2016	Akira	Hindi film
2017	Rangoon	
2023	August 16 1947	

=== As writer ===
Year	Film	Credited as	Notes
Year	Film	Writer	Notes
1997	Poochudava	Dialogues	
2014	Maan Karate	Story	
2022	Raangi	Story	

=== As an actor ===
Year	Title	Role	Notes
1997	Poochudava	Man requesting loan	
2011	7 Aum Arivu	Director in the interview	Uncredited appearance
2012	Thuppakki	Himself	Uncredited appearance in the song "Google Google"
2014	Maan Karate	Himself	Special appearance in the song "Open the Tasmac"
2014	Kaththi	Common man	Uncredited appearance
2015	Isai	Himself	Special appearance
2018	NOTA	Himself	Special appearance
2018	Sarkar	Himself	Uncredited appearance in the song "Oru Viral Puratchi"
2025	Madharaasi	Public person	Uncredited appearance

== Awards ==
Film	Award	Category	Result	Ref.
Ramanaa	Tamil Nadu State Film Awards	Best Dialogue Writer	Won	
Ramanaa	Tamil Nadu State Film Awards	Best Film	Won	
Ghajini	53rd Filmfare Awards South	Best Director – Tamil	Nominated	
Ghajini	Tamil Nadu State Film Awards	Best Film	Won	
Ghajini	Stardust Awards	Hottest New Filmmaker	Won	
Ghajini	54th Filmfare Awards	Best Director	Nominated	
Ghajini	Producers Guild Film Awards	Best Director	Won	
Ghajini	10th IIFA Awards	Best Director	Nominated	
7 Aum Arivu	59th Filmfare Awards South	Best Director	Nominated	
Thuppakki	The Chennai Times Film Awards	Best Director	Nominated	
Thuppakki	The Chennai Times Film Awards	Best Screenplay	Nominated	
Thuppakki	4th Edison Awards	Best Director	Nominated	
Thuppakki	4th Edison Awards	Best Screenplay	Nominated	
Thuppakki	60th Filmfare Awards South	Best Director	Nominated	
Thuppakki	2nd SIIMA Awards	Best Director	Nominated	
Thuppakki	7th Vijay Awards	Favourite Director	Won	
Thuppakki	7th Vijay Awards	Best Director	Nominated	
Raja Rani	Norway Tamil Film Festival Awards	The Most Popular Film	Won	
Raja Rani	8th Vijay Awards	Favourite Film	Nominated	
Raja Rani	3rd SIIMA Awards	Best Film	Nominated	
Kaththi	62nd Filmfare Awards South	Best Director	Won	
Kaththi	1st IIFA Utsavam	Best Director	Nominated	
Kaththi	4th SIIMA Awards	Best Director	Nominated	
Kaththi	9th Vijay Awards	Favourite Director	Won	
Kaththi	9th Vijay Awards	Best Story, Screenplay Writer	Nominated	
Sarkar	66th Filmfare Awards South	Best Director	Nominated	
Sarkar	8th SIIMA Awards	Best Director	Nominated	
Darbar	10th SIIMA Awards	Best Director	Nominated	
