= Allirajah Subaskaran =

British-Sri Lankan entrepreneur (born 1972)

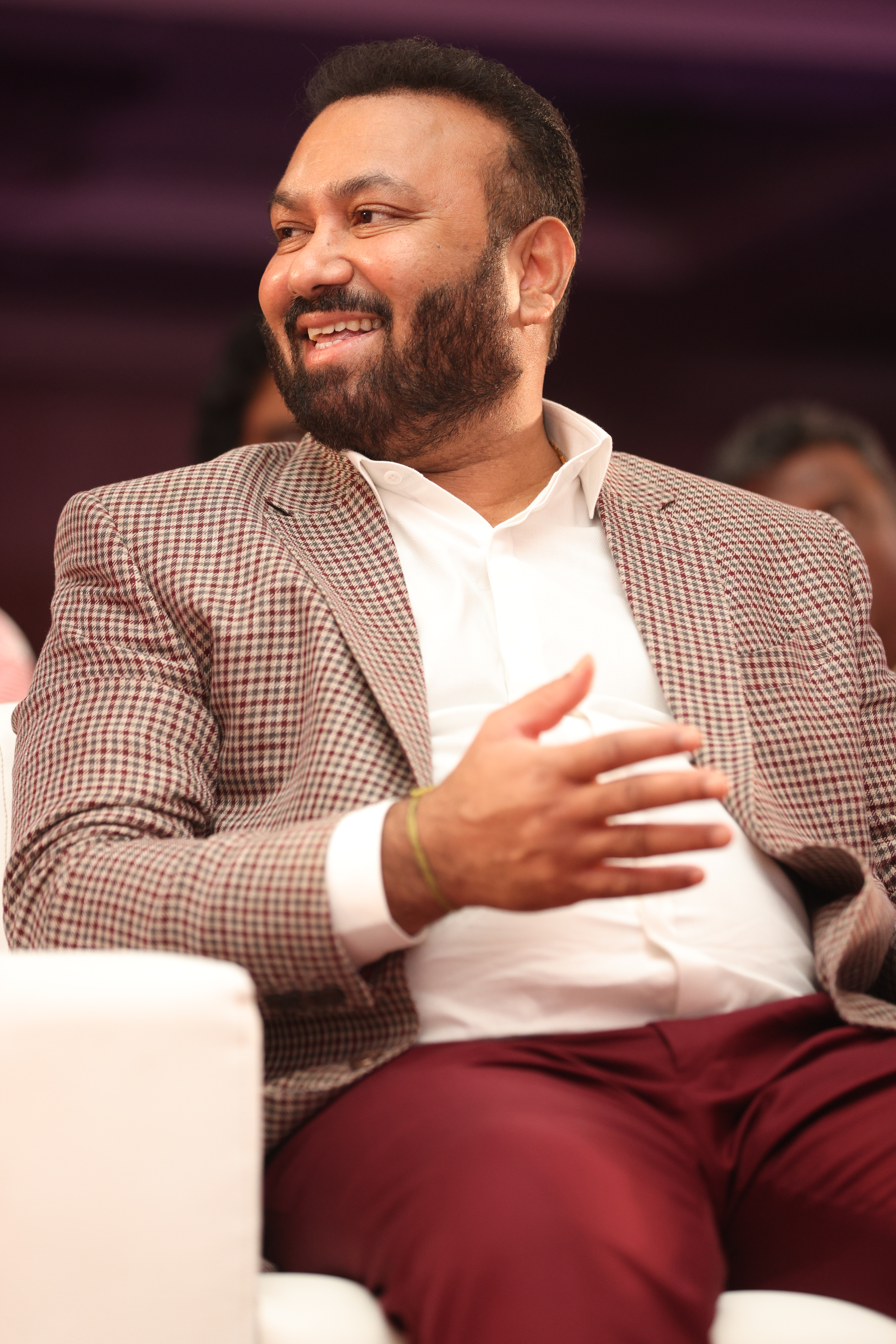
- Born: 2 March 1972 (age 54); Jaffna, Dominion of Ceylon (present-day Sri Lanka)
- Occupations: Businessman; Film producer
- Organization(s): Lyca Mobile, Lyca Productions
- Spouse: Prema Subaskaran
- Children: 3

Allirajah Subaskaran (born 2 March 1972) is a British-Sri Lankan entrepreneur. He was born in Sri Lanka, and later migrated to England and became a British citizen. He is the founder and chairman of Lyca Mobile, a telecommunications company and its entertainment subsidiary, Lyca Productions, based in Chennai, India.

== Career ==
Allirajah started Lycamobile in 2006. As of 2018, Lycamobile was reported to serve 16 million customers across 18 countries.

In 2010, he founded the Gnanam Foundation, named for his mother, Gnanambikai Allirajah. Gnanam has partnered with Muslim Aid to build a well in Sudan, and with Children’s Hunger Relief Fund to renovate wells in Sri Lanka. In 2014, the foundation donated £59,000 to Save the Children during the Ebola crisis in West Africa.

The company's first production was the film Kaththi in 2014. It produced the science fiction thriller 2.0 (2018), which was India's most expensive film and the 5th most expensive non-English-language film at the time of its release.

Since November 2018, Lycatel and its founder have been embroiled in disputes relating to alleged fraud. The company was due for a tribunal hearing in March 2020 to argue against the HM Revenue and Customs. The firm estimates that it would have to pay £60m if it loses – a potential liability that has almost doubled in recent years. Lycamobile declined to say how much is at stake in two other disputes.

In September 2021, he became the new owner of the Jaffna Kings in the Lanka Premier League (LPL). Lyca Kovai Kings, a cricket team based in Coimbatore in the Tamil Nadu Premier League (TNPL) tournament, is owned by Lyca Productions.

Allirajah formerly served on the Advisory Council for Sri Lanka within the British Asian Trust.

== Personal life ==
Allirajah fled Sri Lanka with his family as a teenager, and moved first to France, where he worked at his family's restaurant in Paris, and then at their corner shop. He later settled in the UK.

== Filmography ==
All films produced or distributed by Allirajah Subaskaran have been through Lyca Productions, the company he founded. For a complete list, see Lyca Productions.

== Awards ==
In October 2011 Lycatel was ranked 36th out of 250 leading mid-market private companies in The Sunday Times. Allirajah received a gold award for Best Overall Enterprise in 2010 at the Asian Achievers Award ceremony for the impact he has made on the Asian community in the UK. The Asian Voice Political and Public Life awarded Allirajah in 2011 its "International Entrepreneur of the Year" award.

In 2012 the English Asian Business Awards presented Allirajah with the "2011 Power Business of the Year" award, recognizing the growth of the Lycamobile business globally, as well as the "Social Entrepreneur of the Year" award.
