= Television in Sri Lanka =

Television in Sri Lanka dates back to 1979. Television broadcasting, like other forms of media in the country, is generally divided along linguistic lines, with state and private media operators providing services in Sinhala, Tamil, and English languages.

== History ==
Preliminary work was underway in the first half of the 1970s. Businessmen Anil Wijewardena and Shan Wickremasinghe established the country's first TV station, Independent Television Network, which started broadcasting on 15 April 1979. The new station remained independent for less than two months, as the government took control of it on 5 June 1979 following a dispute with President J. R. Jayewardene. Sri Lanka's second state-owned TV station, Sri Lanka Rupavahini Corporation (SLRC), was established by the Sri Lanka Rupavahini Corporation Act No. 6 of 1982 and started broadcasting on 15 February 1982. The Act required the SLRC to maintain taste and decency and not incite crime and disorder or cause religious or public offence.

The government maintained a monopoly on television broadcasting until 1992, when private TV stations were allowed to broadcast under regulation by the SLRC. Maharaja Television, a joint venture between Capital Maharaja and Singapore Telecommunications Limited, was one of the first private TV stations. Since then, many new TV stations have started in Sri Lanka, including satellite networks and pay-per-view networks. The national telecommunications provider Sri Lanka Telecom also launched an IPTV service in 2008.

During the 1990s and 2000s, multiple broadcasting networks entered the public frequencies. A privately owned company, Swarnawahini, launched in 1997 and still functions under the same brand name. Another major television channel, Derana, launched in 2005 and now has multiple broadcasting platforms, including radio, printed media, and a fully dedicated news channel called adaderana24X7.

Indian productions have been a constant on local television since the beginning, but around 2007, the predominantly Buddhist government taxed Indian series under the assertion that they conveyed foreign values, those of the Hindus.

Advertisers began to create separate commercials for Sinhala and Tamil audiences with their differing cultural norms. Two versions, one for each demographic, were filmed in the same complex and shot in adjacent studios.

Since the 2020 COVID-19 pandemic, television has increased in use for distance education. A table has been created for children to find free study channels in Sri Lanka if they are unable to attend school.

The analogue spectrum was full in November 2025, with no less than 24 channels. The government decided to suspend issuing licenses to new analogue channels and announced the shutdown of analogue signals by 2029. Sri Lanka will employ the ISDB-T standard.

== Television providers ==
=== Current ===
The following is a list of current television providers based in Sri Lanka.

Provider	Ownership	Owner	Transmission	Established
Ask Cable Vision (Note: Available in Jaffna Peninsula only.)	Private	Ask Media & Cable Vision	Analog cable	2010
City Cable (Note: Available in Colombo only.)	Private	City Cable Links	Analog cable, digital cable	
Dialog TV (Note: Formerly CBNsat.)	Private	Dialog Axiata	Digital satellite	July 2005
Star TV Lanka Satnet	Private	Star TV Lanka	Digital satellite	1945
Lanka Broadband Networks (Note: Available in Colombo and Jaffna only.)	Private	Lanka Broadband Networks	Analog cable, digital cable	2000
PEO TV	State-owned (Note: The Government of Sri Lanka owns the majority of shares in Sri Lanka Telecom, the ultimate parent company of PEO TV, either directly or via organisations controlled by it (e.g. Bank of Ceylon, Employees' Provident Fund, National Savings Bank and Sri Lanka Insurance Corporation).)	SLTMobitel	IPTV	September 2008
Satcom (Note: Formerly Srilakvahini.)	Private	Future Sat Com Holdings	Satellite	
TV Lanka	Private		Digital terrestrial	2012

=== Former ===
The following is a list of former television providers which were based in Sri Lanka.

Provider	Ownership	Owner	Transmission	Established	Closed
Multivision (Note: Formerly Comet Cable.)	Private	Ruhunu 2001 Multivision	Analog microwave	1999	2008
Franknet (Note: Formerly Hatton Cable, Special in Up-country and Wellawatte area. Channels of Sun TV Network, Doordarshan from S-C Band Satellite.)	Private	T.Guhan	Cable TV	1995	1998

== Television stations ==
=== Current ===
The following is a list of current television stations based in Sri Lanka.

Station	Ownership	Owner	Language	Established	Terrestrial		Satellite				Cable	IPTV	Streaming
Station	Ownership	Owner	Language	Established	Analogue (Note: Channels 21-69 on UHF, channels 2-12 on VHF.)	Digital	Dialog TV	Dish TV	Freesat	ASK Cable Vision (Pvt) Ltd	LBN	PEO TV	Streaming
Haritha TV	Non-profit	Haritha Network	Sinhala	31 March 2021	No	No	14	No			No	9	Yes
A Plus Kids TV	Private	Ru Sala Media Networks Pvt Ltd	Sinhala	3 July 2017	No	No	48	No			No	No	No
Ada Derana News Channel (Note: Formerly Ada Derana 24)	Private	Derana Macro Entertainment under Dilith Jayaweera	Sinhala/English	20 July 2014	Yes	No	14	2508			No	14	No
ART Television (Note: Formerly Dynavision.)	Private	IWS Holdings	English	1996	Yes	No	13	No			Yes	017	No
Channel C	Private	Wide Angle Productions	Sinhala	10 March 2008	No	No	45	No			No	No	No
Channel Eye (Note: Formerly Rupavahini 2 Sinhalese and Tamil and English Television Channel.)	State-owned	Sri Lanka Rupavahini Corporation	English	April 1999	No	03	No	Yes			002	Yes	
Channel One	Private	Dialog TV	Sinhala / English	6 June 2019	No	No	1	No			No	No	No
Citi Hitz	Private	OnAir World Ceylon	Sinhala	10 December 2007	No	No	19	No			No	No	No
Colombo TV	Private	Colombo Television Limited	Sinhala	1 January 2015	No	No	No	No			No	111	Yes
Dan TV	Private	ASK Media (Pvt) Ltd	Tamil	1 January 1999									
Dharmavahini TV	Private	Dharmavahini Foundation	Sinhala	20 May 2007	No	No	No	No			Yes	No	Yes
Dream TV (Note: Also known as TV Dream Music.)	Private	GalleZone Solutions	Sinhala	2010	No	No	No	2511			No	015	No
ETV (Note: Formerly ETV 2.)	Private	Lyca Productions	English	1995	Yes	No	No	No			Yes	119	No
Heritage TV (Note: Also known as HTV.)	Private	Heritage Television	Sinhala	8 May 2009	No	No	No	No			No	No	No
Hiru TV	Private	Asia Broadcasting Corporation	Sinhala	23 May 2012	Yes	No	11	2507			Yes	019	Yes
ITN Channel	State-owned	Independent Television Network	Sinhala	13 April 1979	Yes	No	04	2517			Yes	003	Yes
iTV	Private	Power Hands Media Network	Sinhala	21 July 2025			No	No	25			125	
Knowledge TV	Private	Pix & Words	Sinhala	2010	No	No	No	No			No	018	No
Nethra TV	State-owned	Sri Lanka Rupavahini Corporation	Tamil	1 January 2008	Yes	No	No	No			No	016	Yes
Rangiri TV	Non-profit	Rangiri Sri Lanka Media Network	Sinhala	July 2011	Yes	No	21	2532			No	022	Yes
Raw TV	Private	Raw Television	Sinhala	26 October 2015	No	No	No	No			No	No	Yes
Ridee TV	Private	Tiss Nagodavithana Films	Sinhala	2012	No	No	18	No			No	No	No
Rupavahini	State-owned	Sri Lanka Rupavahini Corporation	Sinhala	15 February 1982	Yes	No	002	2506			Yes	001	No
Jaya TV Sri Lanka	Private	Jayamaga Media Network	Sinhala	4 February 2020			25					94	
TV Supreme	Private	Supreme Global Holdings	Sinhala	19 December 2019	Yes	No	20	No			No	16	Yes
Sarana TV	Non-profit	Sarana Media Network	Sinhala	2014	No	No	No	No			No	094	No
Shakthi TV	Private	MTV Channel	Tamil	20 October 1998	Yes	No	09	2609			Yes	011	No
Shraddha TV	Non-profit	Mahamevnawa Buddhist Monastery	Sinhala	29 September 2012	Yes	No	Yes	2531	27		No	099	Yes
Sindu TV	Private	Iraj Productions	English/Sinhala	2015	No	No	No	No			Yes	No	No
Sirasa TV (Note: Formerly MTV (Sri Lankan Sinhala And English, Tamil TV channel))	Private	MTV Channel	Sinhala	10 June 1998	Yes	No	08	2513			Yes	010	Yes
Siyatha TV	Private	Voice of Asia Network	Sinhala	17 September 2009	Yes	No	15	2512			Yes	008(SD); 300(HD)	Yes
Siyasa TV	Private	Siyasa Media Network	Sinhala	28 January 2014	No	No	No	No			No	095	No
Sri TV	Private	Sri TV	Sinhala	2006	No	No	No	No			Yes	No	Yes
Star Tamil	Private	Voice of Asia Network	Tamil	17 September 2009	Yes	No	No	2618			Yes	021	No
Swarga TV	Non-profit	Rock Foundation	English/Sinhala/Tamil	2011	No	No	30	No			Yes	No	No
Swarnavahini (Note: Formerly ETV, ETV 1 Sinhalese and Tamil, English Entertainment Television)	Private	Lyca Productions	Sinhala	1997	Yes	No	07	2516			Yes	006	Yes
Talent TV	Private	Capital Corp.	Sinhala	17 July 2025	No	No	No	No	No	No	No	No	
The Buddhist (Note: Also known as Buddhist TV.)	Non-profit	Sri Sambodhi Foundation	Sinhala	29 June 2007	No	No	026	2592			No	096	No
TNL TV	Private	Telshan Networks	English/Sinhala	21 June 1993	Yes	No	12	2526			Yes	013	Yes
TV 1 (Note: Formerly MTV Newsvision, MTV, Channel One MTV, MTV Sports, MTV.)	Private	MTV Channel	English/Sinhala	14 December 1992	Yes	No	10	2553			Yes	012	Yes
TV Derana Formerly Derana TV	Private	Derana Macro Entertainment under Dilith Jayaweera	Sinhala	11 October 2005	Yes	No	06	2514			Yes	004	Yes
TV Didula	Non-profit	Sanhinda Media Network	Sinhala	20 February 2016	No	No	17	2509			Yes	117	No
UTV Tamil (Note: Formerly Udhayam TV.)	Private	SATIS Agency (Pvt) Ltd	Tamil	23 March 2017	Yes	No	23	No			No	127	No
Vasantham TV	State-owned	Independent Television Network	Tamil	25 June 2009	Yes	No	005	2614			Yes	007	Yes
Verbum TV	Non-profit	Verbum Television	English/Sinhala/Tamil	2014	No	No	031	No			No	093	Yes
CeyFLiX	Private	Ausflix PTY LTD	Sinhala/English/Tamil/Hindi	2019	No	No	No	No			No	No	Yes
Lankan Link	Private	CodeNinja PTY LTD	Sinhala/English/Tamil	2015	No	No	No	No			No	No	Yes
ThePapare	Private	Dialog Axiata PLC	Sinhala/English/Tamil	2023	No	No	62, 63, 126	No			No	No	Yes

=== Former ===
The following is a list of former television stations which were based in Sri Lanka.

Ownership	Closed	Station	Language	Established
Private	2013	DAN Tamil Oli	Tamil	January 2009
State-owned	2010	Prime TV	English	12 November 2009
Private	2009	TV 2	English	1 November 2008
