= Carlton Sports Network =

Sri Lankan sports television channel

- Country: Sri Lanka
- Headquarters: 236/1, Denzil Kobbekaduwa Mawatha, Battaramulla

Ownership
- Key people: Janaka Ranathunga (Chief Operation Executive)

History
- Launched: 7 March 2011
- Replaced: TH TV, Prime TV Sri Lanka
- Replaced by: Supreme TV

Links
- Website: www.csntv.lk

Carlton Sports Network (CSN), was a Sri Lankan sports, lifestyles and business television channel. CSN was launched on 7 March 2011 and closed in 2016. It was involved in several controversies since its creation, primarily due to overlapping interests of its connected owners. "Carlton" is considered to be the "brand name" of the Rajapaksa family alongside the Carlton Residence of the Rajapaksas, Carlton Pre School owned by Shiranthi Rajapaksa, and Carlton Rugby owned by Namal Rajapaksa, as well as the Carlton Motor Sports Club linked to Rohitha Rajapaksa.

== History ==
Carlton Sports Network (Pvt) Ltd was registered as a company on 10 February 2011. Its four directors were S. K. Dissanayaka (aged 22), A. R. Fernando (aged 23), S. Karunajeewa and Rohan Welivita. The registered address of the company – 260/12 Torrington Avenue, Colombo 5 – had been used by President Rajapaksa during the 2004 parliamentary election. Welivita was a presidential adviser on electronic media and is married to Anoma Welivita, the PA to Shiranthi Rajapaksa. The CEO of CSN was Nishantha Ranatunga, the former secretary of Sri Lanka Cricket (SLC), the controlling body for cricket in Sri Lanka.

Dinesh Jayawardana was appointed a director on 1 March 2011. Welivita ceased being a director on 6 March 2011.

CSN was issued a licence to broadcast on 3 March 2011. CSN started broadcasting on 7 March 2011, taking over the terrestrial frequencies and pay TV channels occupied by Prime TV Sri Lanka, a station operated by the state-owned Independent Television Network. The launch was celebrated by a special event held at the Atrium, Cinnamon Grand Hotel which was attended by Yoshitha Rajapaksa, Shiranthi Rajapaksa and Sports Minister Mahindananda Aluthgamage.

From its creation, it had been speculated that CSN was owned by President Rajapaksa's family but those associated with the station denied this. In June 2012 Sri Lanka Cricket admitted that CSN was owned by President Rajapaksa's sons Yoshitha Rajapaksa and Namal Rajapaksa.

=== Corruption investigations ===
Yoshitha Rajapaksa and four others including Nishantha Ranatunga, Rohan Weliwita were remanded on 30 January 2016 until 11 February, over the alleged financial irregularities at the CSN. In August 2016 157.5 Million rupees were found and confiscated. Investigations revealed that the money has been deposited in a private bank under the name of a different company

== Tax ==
The network has been accused of misusing state funds under the former President of Sri Lanka, Mahinda Rajapaksa and having not paid any taxes to the government. Finance Minister Ravi Karunanayake, who opened the debate on the interim budget, introduced a Super Gain tax to charge a levy from some companies that prospered disproportionately during the tenure of the previous government while making a minimum contribution to the economy. He cited CSN as an example and said it had neither paid the spectrum tax nor the electricity charges. "CSN has usurped the sports telecasting rights of the state-run television channels and misappropriated the fleet of vehicles assigned to the Presidential Security Division (PSD) for its business operations. That is how it has made huge profits," the minister said adding that one-fourth of the income accrued by these companies will be charged as tax if they had made a profit of Rs.2,000 million or more during the financial year 2013/2014.

== Cricket broadcasting rights ==
Cricket is the most favourite sport of Sri Lanka, and the rights to broadcast cricket can be very lucrative. The state-owned Sri Lanka Rupavahini Corporation paid Rs 143 million ($1.1 million) for the rights to the 2011 Cricket World Cup but earned Rs 556 million ($4.3 million) in advertising.

Broadcasting regulations had meant that international cricket matches could only be broadcast by the state-owned media in Sri Lanka. As a consequence state-owned Rupavahini had had a monopoly on broadcasting cricket in Sri Lanka since 1996 except for one year. In 2011 a cabinet decision was taken to amend the broadcasting regulations, allowing international cricket matches to be broadcast by either a state-owned broadcaster or a dedicated sports channel. Taking advantage of this, the newly formed CSN won the broadcasting rights to the Australian tour of Sri Lanka. Unusually, Rupavahini did not bid for the rights.

In 2011 CSN was also awarded the broadcasting rights to the newly created Sri Lanka Premier League and the Pakistani and Sri Lanka tour of UAE.

In May 2012 CSN was awarded the broadcasting rights for cricket for three years (2012–2015) for Rs 125 million ($1 million). It has been estimated that the rights should have cost the broadcaster at least Rs 3,000 million. CSN was the only bidder for the rights. It was highly unusual as previously rights had been awarded on a series-by-series basis. MTV Channel (Pvt) Ltd, which owns rival sports station MTV Sports, threatened legal action alleging a number of irregularities and a conflict of interest with SLC secretary Nishantha Ranatunga being CSN CEO. The rights to telecast the 2015 ICC World Cup were removed from the channel by the new government and awarded to the SLRC.
