= Siyatha FM =

- Sri Lanka
- Frequencies: 98.2 MHz (Kikiliyamana); 98.4 MHz (Colombo, Hanthana, Gongala, Gammaduwa)

Programming
- Language: Sinhala

Ownership
- Owner: Voice of Asia Network (Pvt) Ltd
- Sister stations: Varnam TV, Siyatha TV, Varnam FM, Kiss FM (Sri Lanka)

Links
- Website: www.siyathafm.lk

Siyatha FM is a radio station based in Colombo, Sri Lanka. It is owned by Voice of Asia (Private) Ltd., which also runs its sister television channel Siyatha TV. Siyatha FM is available on 98.2 MHz, 98.4 MHz Islandwide in Sri Lanka.

Siyatha FM was also the Exclusive Broadcaster for the ICC T20 Cricket World Cup 2014

== See also ==
- List of radio networks in Sri Lanka
