= Prime TV Sri Lanka =

Prime TV

Location
- Wickramasinhapura, Battaramulla, Sri Lanka

Information
- Type: Semi Government/Public Company
- Established: 12 November 2009
- Website: Prime TV

Prime TV was a television channel which broadcasts in Sri Lanka. The channel is operated by the Independent Television Network Limited, which is a state governed television and radio broadcaster in Sri Lanka. The channel broadcast content in the English language.

The frequencies were taken over by the Carlton Sports Network on 7 March 2011. Its programming, including its news operation (Prime News), moved to Vasantham TV.

== See also ==
- List of television networks in Sri Lanka
- Media in Sri Lanka
- Independent Television Network Limited
