= Siyatha TV =

Sri Lankan TV channel

- Country: Sri Lanka
- Broadcast area: Sri Lanka; Maldives (via Medianet)
- Network: Voice of Asia
- Headquarters: Colombo

Programming
- Language: Sinhala
- Picture format: 576i SDTV on Terrestrial television, Dialog TV, PEO TV, Dish TV Sri Lanka

Ownership
- Owner: Voice of Asia Network (Pvt) Ltd
- Sister channels: Varnam TV, Siyatha FM, Varnam FM, Kiss FM

History
- Launched: 17 September 2009

Links
- Website: www.siyathatv.lk

Siyatha TV is a private Sri Lankan 4K Ultra HD channel currently broadcasting in Sri Lanka in the Sinhala language. It is owned by the Voice of Asia Network (Pvt) Ltd, which also runs radio channels named Siyatha FM, Real Radio, Kiss FM and Vettri FM.

== Background ==
Along with their sister channel, Vettri TV, the Voice of Asia Network (Pvt) began broadcasting Siyatha TV on September 17, 2009 on E32 UHF.

Siyatha TV is the first Sri Lankan terrestrial channel to go simultaneously on satellite through their own DTH platform. This platform currently carry all VOA Television and Radio channels on Intelsat 906 satellite located at 64´E.

Roshantha Kariyapperuma, owns the Voice of Asia Network which owns Siyatha TV along-with Roshantha Kariyapperuma's brother, Priyantha Kariyapperuma, who was a former Director General of the Telecommunications Regulatory Commission of Sri Lanka (TRC).

== Revamp ==
On 15 February 2017, the parent company Voice of Asia Network (Pvt) Ltd had their network relaunch, Siyatha TV, revamped their entire line-up of programs and the look and feel of the TV station along with becoming an "Ultra HD 4K Television Channel".

== Programming ==
Siyatha TV broadcasts a range of entertainment programmes including dramas, reality shows, Kids Programme, Cartoons, music and News. It operates 16 hours a day, between 05:00 am and 12:00 midnight.

In April 2010, a quiz program titled Siyatha TV T20 Quiz was telecast.

== New Station ==
Voice of Asia is expected to launch a new station, Real TV, in coming months.

== Firebombing ==
Early on July 30, 2010, 12 armed men attacked and firebombed the Siyatha TV and radio station, destroying much of the broadcasting equipment. The gunmen forced the staff to kneel at gunpoint, and injured two of them.
