= Raja FM =

Sri Lankan radio station

Raja FM was a Sinhalese broadcasting channel owned by the Colombo Communications Ltd., mainly targeting the young adult population in Sri Lanka. The station was suspended by the government of Sri Lanka due to a programme of vulgar nature not being taken off the station's programming despite repeated public and legal requests. Raja FM has been banned by the Sri Lankan Government on 9 November 2006.

== See also ==
- Shree FM
