= 88.8 FM =

FM radio frequency

The following radio stations broadcast on FM frequency 88.8 MHz:

== Algeria ==
- Annaba FM at Annaba

== Australia ==
- Pine Radio pirate broadcast heard around sydney and newcastle some nights.

== China ==
- CNR The Voice of China in Meizhou
- CRI Hit FM in Wuhan (stopped airing in 2019)
- Zhongshan Travel Radio in Zhongshan

== Germany ==
- rbb 88.8 at Berlin

== Indonesia ==
- RRI Programa 3 in Denpasar, Jakarta, Medan, and Singaraja

== Israel ==
- Radio Makan in Safed

== Malaysia ==
- Gegar in Kuantan, Pahang

== Nepal ==
- Nepali ko Radio 88.8, Kathmandu, Nepal

== Sri Lanka ==
- Sitha FM Also on 88.6 MHz

== Turkey ==
- Gebze FM in Istanbul and Bursa

== United Kingdom ==
- BBC Radio 2 at Crystal Palace and other locations.
- BBC Radio Jersey at Saint Helier, Jersey, Channel Islands
