= Prime Radio Sri Lanka =

Prime Radio

Sri Lanka
- Frequencies: 104.5 FM (Colombo); 99.0 FM (Galle); 95.5 FM (Kandy)

History
- First air date: 12 November 2009

Links
- Website: Prime Radio

Prime Radio is an FM radio station which broadcasts in Sri Lanka. The radio station is operated by Independent Television Network Limited, a state governed television and radio broadcaster in Sri Lanka.

This radio network is a relaunch of the Radio One radio station of Sri Lanka, previously owned by Singer (Sri Lanka) and Peoples Media Networks. The station primarily broadcasts content in the English language. It commenced transmission on 12 November 2009.

== Shows ==
The radio station's programming is primarily music of various genres, with shows including Monique, Afternoon Treat and Chat with Monique, Classic Delights, Drive Thru, Mid Day Connections, Prime Breakfast, Prime Morning Music, Prime Night Music, Sunday Requests, Sunday Wakeup, That's Jazz, The Country Crowd, and The Night Cap.

== Frequency and coverage ==
The Prime Radio terrestrial coverage is limited to a few major cities in Sri Lanka at present. The station broadcasts on 104.5 FM in Colombo, 99.0 in Galle and 95.5 in Kandy and is also streamed on the station's website.

== See also ==
- List of radio networks in Sri Lanka
- Media in Sri Lanka
- Independent Television Network Limited
