= Star Tamil TV =

Sri Lankan Tamil-language television channel

- Country: Sri Lanka
- Broadcast area: Sri Lanka
- Network: Voice of Asia Network
- Headquarters: Colombo, Sri Lanka

Programming
- Language: Tamil

Ownership
- Owner: Voice of Asia Network (Pvt) Ltd
- Sister channels: Siyatha TV, Siyatha FM, Varnam FM, Kiss FM (Sri Lanka)

History
- Launched: 17 September 2009
- Former names: Vettri TV, Varnam TV

Vettri TV is a Tamil television service in Sri Lanka. The channel started broadcasting on 17 September 2009, the same day as its Sinhala sister station Siyatha TV.
