= Nethra TV =

- Country: Sri Lanka
- Broadcast area: Sri Lanka
- Network: Sri Lanka Rupavahini Corporation
- Headquarters: Chavakachcheri, Jaffna

Programming
- Language: Tamil
- Picture format: 576i 4:3 (SDTV)

Ownership
- Owner: Government of Sri Lanka

History
- Launched: 5 January 2008; 18 years ago

Links
- Website: www.nethratv.lk

Nethra TV (Tamil: நேத்ரா TV) is a terrestrial (free-to-air) television channel in Sri Lanka operated by the Sri Lanka Rupavahini Corporation. A Tamil-language channel, the channel is based in Colombo. Nethra TV's unit is also responsible for the production of Rupavahini's Muslim programming.

== History ==
Tamil programming was carried on Rupavahini's main channel since the beginning and in the 2000s on Channel Eye. In January 2008, using Channel Eye's frequencies, Nethra TV started operating on a timeshare basis, between 6:30 am and 9 pm. The new channel opened on 5 January 2008 with the first programme being the interreligious programme Talk For the Day. The 7 pm Tamil Rupavahini News bulletin, which was already on Channel Eye, was now under Nethra TV's schedule. The launch of the channel was also marked by a special ceremony. Its first head was S. Vishvakanthan.

In 2017, the SLRC was planning a separate building for a new version of Nethra TV, under the tagline of the "Reconciliation Channel", with its facilities in Jaffna in the north of the country. A separate frequency was also granted. Nethra TV as a standalone channel started broadcasting on 20 February 2018; its launch was presided by President Maithripala Sirisena. The Japanese government also donated 449 educational television programmes at a cost of Rs 73.6 million, dubbed in Tamil per a Rs 42.7 million grant. The upgraded service raised doubts about its intended audience, as Tamils in the south were unable to understand its contents, as well as Tamil youth adopting Western cultural norms. Others suggested that the standalone version of the channel helped rekindle interest in Tamil culture.

== See also ==
- Channel Eye
