= NTV (Sri Lankan TV channel) =

Sri Lankan tamil television channel

- Type: Broadcaster
- Country: Sri Lanka
- Availability: Terrestrially in Colombo, nationwide Peo tv
- Motto: It's your world
- Owner: Government of Sri Lanka
- Launch date: November 19, 2009
- Picture format: 1080i 16:9 (HDTV)
- Official website: www.ntv.lk
- Replaced by: Channel Eye

NTV was a general entertainment channel operated by the Sri Lanka Rupavahini Corporation.

== History ==
NTV began broadcasting in November 2009 amidst controversy from Sri Lankan netizens due to limited coverage and lack of carriage by Dialog TV.

The channel rebranded in 2013, in time for the 2013 CHOGM.

The channel didn't make any original content, however there where cartoons produced by "Marathon" telecasted including Code Lyoko, Team Galaxy, Galactic Football, Totally Spies etc. The schedule consisted of shows that weren't airing on the other SLRC channels, accompanied by some of Nesem Tv productions, and a 12pm news bulletin in English. It closed down in February 2015, the latest time NTV's website was updated. The channel's closure was due to low ratings.
