= Radio in Sri Lanka =

Radio broadcasting in Sri Lanka dates to 1923. Radio broadcasting, like other forms of media in Sri Lanka, is generally divided along linguistic lines with state and private media operators providing services in Sinhala, Tamil, and English language.

== History ==
The first radio broadcast in Ceylon was in 1923 when recorded music was broadcast using parts of radio equipment from a captured German submarine. Regular broadcasting started in Colombo in July 1924. Ceylon's first radio station Radio Colombo started regular broadcasting on 16 December 1925. The station was taken over by the British military during World War II who renamed the station Radio SEAC which broadcast across South Asia from October 1944. After the war the station was handed back to the civilian government of Ceylon who renamed it Radio Ceylon on 1 October 1949. The station was immensely popular both in Ceylon and other parts of Asia.

The Ceylon Broadcasting Corporation Act No. 37 of 1966 incorporated the Department of Broadcasting. Radio Ceylon became a public corporation on 30 September 1967, changing its name to Ceylon Broadcasting Corporation (CBC). Ceylon was renamed Sri Lanka in 1972 after becoming a republic and consequently CBC was renamed Sri Lanka Broadcasting Corporation (SLBC).

SLBC broadcast on medium wave until 1993 when FM broadcasting began. 95% of the country received FM transmissions by 1999. The government maintained a monopoly on radio broadcasting until the early 1990s when private radio stations were allowed to broadcast. Today there are numerous private radio stations but the state-owned stations continue to dominate the market.

== Radio stations ==
The following is a list of radio stations based in Sri Lanka.

=== Terrestrial radio ===
Station	Ownership	Owner	Language	Established	FM 1 (MHz)	FM 2 (MHz)	Internet
Buddhist Radio	Charity	Sri Sambodhi Media Network	Sinhala		101.3	101.5	Yes
City FM	State-owned	Sri Lanka Broadcasting Corporation	Sinhala		89.6	89.8	Yes
Mathi FM	Private	MS Broadcasting Company	English	25 April 2012	108.1	108.3	Yes
FM Derana	Private	Derana Macro Entertainment under Dilith Jayaweera	Sinhala	29 March 2009	92.2	92.4	Yes
Fox FM (formerly New FM, Allai)	Private	Asset Radio Broadcasting	English		91.4	—N/a	Yes
GoldFM	Private	Asia Broadcasting Corporation	English	September 1998	93.0	93.2	Yes
Hiru FM	Private	Asia Broadcasting Corporation	Sinhala	1998	96.1	96.3	Yes
Lakhanda radio (formerly Lakhanda radio, ITN FM)	State-owned	Independent Television Network	Sinhala		93.5	93.7	Yes
Kiss FM (formerly Kiss 898)	Private	Voice of Asia Network	English	13 August 2009	96.9	—N/a	Yes
Kothmale FM / Kotmale Community Radio	State-owned	Sri Lanka Broadcasting Corporation	Sinhala and Tamil		97.6	—N/a	—N/a
Lak FM	Private	Lakview Broadcasting	Sinhala		106.0	106.2	Yes
Lakviru	Private	Lakviru Radio and Television Network	Sinhala		105.2	105.4	—N/a
Isura FM (formerly Legends FM, Kirula FM)	Private	MBC Networks	English		96.6	—N/a	Yes
Lite FM	Private	TNL Radio Network	English	27 February 1999	87.6	87.8	Yes
Neth FM	Private	Asset Radio Broadcasting	Sinhala		94.8	95.0	Yes
Pirai FM (Muslim)	State-owned	Sri Lanka Broadcasting Corporation	Tamil		90.1	—N/a	—N/a
Ran FM (formerly Ranone FM and Raja FM)	Private	EAP Broadcasting Company	Sinhala		88.1	100.5	Yes
Rangiri Sri Lanka	Charity	Rangiri Sri Lanka Media Network	Sinhala		104.4	105.7	Yes
Real Radio	Private	Voice of Asia Network	English		97.1	—N/a	Yes
Red FM	Private	Sky Media Network	English		107.8	—N/a	Yes
Rhythm FM (formerly Asura FM, Rhythm FM, Rhythm World)	Private	TNL Radio Network	Sinhala		95.6	95.8	Yes
Seth FM	Private	Friend Media Network	Sinhala		103.1	—N/a	Yes
Shaa FM (formerly Tharu FM)	Private	Asia Broadcasting Corporation	Sinhala		90.9	91.1	Yes
Shakthi FM	Private	MBC Networks	Tamil	20 November 1998	103.9	104.1	Yes
Shree FM (formerly Savana Radio)	Private	EAP Broadcasting Company	Sinhala	1999	100.0	100.2	Yes
Sitha FM (formerly Singha FM & Youth Radio)	Private	Sky Media Network	Sinhala		88.6	88.8	Yes
Sirasa FM	Private	MBC Networks	Sinhala	2 March 1994	106.5	106.7	Yes
Siyatha FM	Private	Voice of Asia Network	Sinhala		98.2	98.4	Yes
Vidula	State-owned	Sri Lanka Broadcasting Corporation	English, Sinhala, Tamil		107.3	107.5	—N/a
SLBC Commercial Service (Velanda Sevaya)	State-owned	Sri Lanka Broadcasting Corporation	Sinhala		94.3	94.5	Yes
Thendral FM	State-owned	Sri Lanka Broadcasting Corporation	Tamil		104.7	104.9	Yes
Radio Sri Lanka	State-owned	Sri Lanka Broadcasting Corporation	English		97.4	97.6	Yes
SLBC National Service (Swadeshiya Sevaya)	State-owned	Sri Lanka Broadcasting Corporation	Sinhala		91.7	91.9	Yes
SLBC National Service	State-owned	Sri Lanka Broadcasting Corporation	Tamil		102.1	102.3	Yes
SLBC Regional Service (Dabana)	State-owned	Sri Lanka Broadcasting Corporation	Sinhala		97.6	—N/a	—N/a
SLBC Regional Service (Jaffna)	State-owned	Sri Lanka Broadcasting Corporation	Sinhala/Tamil		90.1	—N/a	Yes
SLBC Regional Service (Kandurata Sevaya)	State-owned	Sri Lanka Broadcasting Corporation	Sinhala/Tamil		107.3	—N/a	Yes
SLBC Regional Service (Rajarata Sevaya)	State-owned	Sri Lanka Broadcasting Corporation	Sinhala		107.3	—N/a	Yes
SLBC Regional Service (Ruhunu Sevaya)	State-owned	Sri Lanka Broadcasting Corporation	Sinhala		107.3	107.5	—N/a
SLBC Regional Service (Uva)	State-owned	Sri Lanka Broadcasting Corporation	Sinhala		107.3	—N/a	—N/a
SLBC Regional Service (Wayamba Handa)	State-owned	Sri Lanka Broadcasting Corporation	Sinhala		90.1	—N/a	—N/a
SLBC Sports Service	State-owned	Sri Lanka Broadcasting Corporation	English, Sinhala, Tamil		107.3	107.5	—N/a
Sooriyan FM	Private	Asia Broadcasting Corporation	Tamil		103.4	103.6	Yes
Sun FM	Private	Asia Broadcasting Corporation	English		98.7	98.9	Yes
Isira, Pearlbayradio (formerly Supreme Radio)	Private	Telshan Networks	Sinhala		89.1	89.3	Yes
TNL Radio (formerly TNL Rocks)	Private	TNL Radio Network	English		99.2	101.8	Yes
V FM	Private	Lanka Television Network	Sinhala		107.0	—N/a	Yes
Vasantham FM	State-owned	Independent Television Network	Tamil		102.6	102.8	Yes
Star tamil radio (formerly Varanam FM, Vettri FM)	Private	Voice of Asia Network	Tamil	11 February 2008	90.4	90.6	Yes
Capital Radio (formerly Sath FM)	Private	Sat Net	Tamil		94.0	—N/a	Yes
Y FM	Private	MBC Networks	Sinhala	1 December 2005	92.7	—N/a	Yes
Yes FM	Private	MBC Networks	English	10 December 1993	100.8	101.0	Yes
Tamil Radio	Private	Sky Media Network	Tamil	—N/a	99.7	99.5	Yes
Athavan Radio	Private	Lyca Media	Tamil	October 2016	95.3	—N/a	Yes

=== Internet radio ===
Station	Ownership	Owner	Language	Established
My Radio 360	Private	MM Media Network (Pvt) Ltd	Tamil, Sinhala, English, Hindi	2024
Anurata Radio	Private	Anurata Media	Sinhala, English, Tamil, Hindi	2024
Starline FM Visual Radio	Private	Starline Media Network	Sinhala, Hindi, Tamil	1 July 2024
Youth One Radio	Private	Vibe Broadcasting Network	Sinhala	4 July 2022
Hela Nada Radio	Private	Vibe Broadcasting Network	Sinhala	31 May 2024
HITZ fm 24	Private	Vibe Broadcasting Network	English	1 November 2021
WIDE Radio	Private	Vibe Broadcasting Network	English	31 May 2024
Ever Fm	Private	Ever Broadcasting Group	Sinhala	12 March 2021
Beat FM	Private	DigiBiz Holdings Pvt Ltd	Sinhala, Tamil, English	9 May 2015
Heart FM	Private	DigiBiz Holdings Pvt Ltd	Sinhala, Tamil, English	16 May 2021
Radio.lk	Private	DigiBiz Holdings Pvt Ltd	Sinhala, Tamil, English	25 November 2022
GOODFM.LK	Private	Good Media Network Limited	Sinhala, English, Tamil, Hindi	2017
FREEFM.LK	Private	Good Media Network Limited	Sinhala, English, Tamil, Hindi	2017
CSL FM	Private	CS BroadCasting Limited	Sinhala/English	2023
Mark FM	Private	MF GROUP PVT LTD	Sinhala	2016
Amen FM	Private	MF GROUP PVT LTD	English	2022
Haritha Radio	Community	Haritha Network (Haritha TV)	Sinhala	2022
Aquinas Radio	Private	Aquinas University College.	Sinhala and English	2014
CRI Sri Lanka	Private	China Radio International	English and Sinhala	2010
Daham Gagana Radio	Charity	Edirisingharama Monastery	Sinhala	2011
Everlasting Radio	Private	MJF Media	English	
ilamai FM	Private	ilamai Media	Tamil	24 October 2012
Kirula Radio	Private		Sinhala	
Sabanda Radio	Private	Sabanda Networks	Sinhala	10 October 2015
Siyeli Handa	Charity	Sinhala Catholic Radio	Sinhala	2013
Rasa FM	Private	Sky Media Network	Sinhala	
Tamil2 FM	private	Tamil 2	Tamil	January 2016
Tamilaruvi Radio	private	North East Media	Tamil	May 2011
Thaalam FM	Private	Yellowin Media	Tamil	
Tharu	Private		Sinhala	
Max digital radio (Note: formerly yathra fm, you fm, MAX Radio)	Private	MGMR Networks	Sinhala	10 September 2006
Sanda Radio	Private		Sinhala	2024
Athavan Radio	Private	Lyca Media	Tamil	October 2016

== International broadcasters ==
Several international broadcasters operate radio stations aimed at Sri Lankan audiences but broadcasting from outside Sri Lanka:

- All India Radio
- Starline FM Visual Radio Sinhala, Hindi and Tamil Service
- BBC World Service Sinhala Service (Sandeshaya)
- BBC World Service Tamil Service (Tamilosai)
- China Radio International Sinhala Service
- China Radio International Tamil Service
- Radio Veritas Asia

Some broadcasters use local transmitters to relay their broadcasts. Deutsche Welle broadcasts are relayed via Trincomalee on medium wave and short wave. Trans World Radio India broadcasts on medium wave using SLBC's transmitter in Puttalam. The International Broadcasting Bureau broadcasts programmes from Voice of America, Radio Azadi, Radio Free Afghanistan, Radio Free Asia, Radio Liberty and Radio Sawa on short wave using the relay station at Iranawila.

== See also ==
- List of Sri Lankan Broadcasters
- List of Television in Sri Lanka
- List of newspapers in Sri Lanka
