= E FM =

Coordinates: 6.897816°N 79.853459°E

Colombo; Sri Lanka
- Broadcast area: Colombo and Kandy
- Frequencies: Colombo: 88.3 MHz; Kandy: 92.3 MHz

Programming
- Format: Contemporary hit radio, Classic hits

Ownership
- Owner: EAP Broadcasting Company; (Colombo Communications Ltd.)
- Sister stations: Shree FM, Ran FM

History
- First air date: 1999
- Former names: Capital Radio
- Former frequencies: 100.4 MHz (Colombo)

Links
- Webcast: Listen Live
- Website: www.efm.lk

E FM (88.3 FM) is a Colombo, Sri Lanka–based radio station. Tagged with the catchphrase "Your Lifestyle Station", E FM is one of the three radio channels (Shree FM and Ran FM) operated and managed by EAP Broadcasting Company Ltd., a subsidiary of the EAP Edirisinghe Group of Companies.

E FM broadcasts live at 88.3 MHz and is also simulcasted in Kandy at 93.2 MHz.

== History and Music ==
The station commenced broadcasting in Colombo and Kandy in December 1999. And on 14 September 2007, the station's official website, www.efm.lk, was launched.

E FM was relaunched in September 2007 as Your Lifestyle Station, and repositioned in 2008 as a 1980s music station before reverted to its "Your Lifestyle Station" slogan at the end of 2013 as it introduced new programming.
