= Independent Television Network =

Sri Lankan state-owned broadcaster

Independent Television Network Ltd
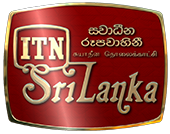
- Type: Government-owned corporation
- Industry: Television
- Genre: Mass media
- Founded: 5 June 1979; 47 years ago
- Founder: Shan Wickremesinghe; Anil R. Wijewardene
- Headquarters: Wickramasinghepura, Battaramulla, Sri Lanka
- Area served: Sri Lanka
- Key people: Shan Wickramasinghe (founder); Anil Wijewardene (founder)
- Products: Broadcasting Network
- Revenue: ▲ Rs 2.492 billion (2015)
- Operating income: ▼ Rs 507.33 million(2015)
- Net income: ▲ Rs 433.021 million (2015)
- Total assets: ▲ Rs 4.059 billion (2015)
- Total equity: ▲ Rs 3.198 billion (2015)
- Number of employees: 684 (2018)
- Parent: Ministry of Information and Mass Media
- Website: www.itn.lk

Independent Television Network Ltd (Sinhala: ස්වාධීන රූපවාහිනී මාධ්‍ය ජාලය; Tamil: சுயாதீன தொலைக்காட்சி ஊடக வளையமைப்பு), also known as ITN Ltd or simply as ITN (Sinhala: අයිටීඑන්), is a state-governed television and radio broadcaster in Sri Lanka. Its headquarters are located in Wickramasinghepura, Battaramulla. ITN received the Shrama Abhimani Award in October 2009. The network broadcasts programmes to a wide demographic within Sri Lanka as well as to the expatriate community. Its content is presented in Sinhala, Tamil, and English, with broadcast coverage extending to 99% of the country.

The ITN channel is the flagship television channel of ITN Ltd. In addition, ITN operates three FM radio stations: Lakhanda (formerly ITN FM), which broadcasts in Sinhala; Vasantham FM, which broadcasts in Tamil; and Prime Radio, which broadcasts in English. ITN also operates Vasantham TV, a second television channel that broadcasts in Tamil. In recent years, ITN launched ITN News, an online portal designed to distribute local news internationally.

ITN channel was the first 1080p full HD television channel in Sri Lanka. ITN Ltd invested Rs. 200 million in the construction of the country's first HD studio complex, commencing high-resolution broadcasting on 30 June 2016.

== History ==
Prior to the establishment of ITN, several decisions had to be taken regarding the deployment of television in Sri Lanka. The Japanese company NEC provided technical assistance for the construction of the station, and later also supported the establishment of Rupavahini in 1982. The development of ITN took place alongside that of Rupavahini. One of the crucial decisions concerned the selection of a colour television system. Although neighbouring India was then operating a black-and-white system using NTSC equipment, Sri Lanka adopted the PAL system, with technical support provided by Japan, which itself used a variant of NTSC.

ITN was founded by Anil Wijewardene and Shan Wickremesinghe at Mahalwarawa, with additional support from an American investor. The first test transmissions were carried out in 1979 and were initially received only in Colombo, the channel's first coverage area. Early programming included international content such as the American educational series Sesame Street and the British sitcom Mind Your Language.

ITN Ltd formally commenced operations on 13 April 1979 with the launch of the ITN television channel. As the first television broadcasting service in Sri Lanka and South Asia, ITN introduced the first terrestrial television channel in the country. It was also the first privately owned television station in a region where radio and television were generally under government control. The founding board of directors comprised Shan Wickramasinghe, Anil Wijewardene and Bob Christie. Initially, the ITN studios and transmission station were located at Mahalwarawa Estate, Pannipitiya. A one-kilowatt transmitter and a 65 feet (20 m) transmission tower broadcast within a 15 miles (24 km) radius of Colombo. However, due to the geographical location of the station, weather conditions and limitations of the transmission equipment, early viewers often experienced disruptions and interference in programmes caused by voltage fluctuations.

On 5 June 1979, ITN Ltd was taken over by the state as a business undertaking under a Competent Authority. The late D. Thevis L. Guruge, former Director General of the Sri Lanka Broadcasting Corporation, was appointed as Competent Authority and played a significant role in the early development of the organisation.

Soon after commencing test broadcasts, ITN expanded its regular programming to a wider urban area. Local companies began importing Japanese-manufactured television sets, and sales quickly exceeded projections by UNESCO. At the time, television in India was still limited to black-and-white transmissions by Doordarshan, largely aimed at agricultural education, which contributed to the high demand for Japanese-made television sets in Sri Lanka, some of which were smuggled across borders due to the absence of an established market for foreign brands.

ITN was also the pioneer of colour television broadcasting in Sri Lanka. On 5 June 1984, ITN relocated to its present headquarters in Wickramasinhapura. In 1992, ITN was converted into a public company, with the state as its major shareholder. Thereafter, its revenue, programming diversity, technical capacity and coverage expanded considerably.

Among its radio operations, ITN manages Lakhanda and Vasantham FM. Lakhanda originated as a subsidiary of the Sri Lanka Broadcasting Corporation (SLBC) and was amalgamated with ITN Ltd on 1 April 1997. It broadcasts content in Sinhala. Vasantham FM, launched in June 2009, was established to cater to the Tamil-speaking community in Sri Lanka.

On 25 June 2009, ITN introduced its second television channel, Vasantham TV, which broadcasts in Tamil. On 12 November 2009, ITN also launched Prime TV and Prime Radio, which provide content in English.

== Programmes ==
The television channels and radio stations of ITN Ltd broadcast a wide range of programmes in Sinhala, Tamil and English. The following are some of the programmes and genres associated with its services.

ITN channel (Sinhala)

- News (in Sinhala, Tamil and English)
- Teledramas (Amaa, Ridee Siththam, Muthu Warusa, Tharu Piri Ahasak, Parana Towuma, Poori, Emy, Snehaye Dasi, Nethu Piyena Thura, Kopi Kade, Aluth Gedera, Sihina Tharaka, Rantharu, Bonda Meedum, Rana)
- Films – Classic Sinhala films
- Documentaries (Atapattama)
- Educational programmes
- Children's entertainment
- Programmes dubbed in Sinhala
- Game shows
- Reality television
- Religious programmes
- Political debates

Vasantham TV (Tamil)

- News
- Teledramas
- Films – Tamil and Hindi films
- Documentaries
- Educational programmes
- Children's entertainment

Prime TV (English)

- News
- Music programmes (Music Runway, House of Rock, Music With Bevil)
- Debates and discussions (The Round Table, Ayubowan Sri Lanka, Prime Sunrise)
- Educational and variety programmes (Prime Sunset)
- Drama (Beverly Hills 90210, Relic Hunter, Queen of Swords)
- Other content – Sports, foreign news, cartoons

Lakhanda (Sinhala)

- News
- Music – Sinhala
- Religious programmes
- Educational programmes
- Political programmes

Vasantham FM (Tamil)

- News
- Music – Tamil
- Religious programmes
- Educational programmes
- Political programmes

Prime Radio (English)

- News
- Music

== Frequencies and coverage ==
Cumulatively, the broadcasts of ITN Ltd reach more than 99% of Sri Lanka. However, the individual coverage of each television channel and radio station varies considerably.

ITN

- Frequencies: VHF Channel 9, VHF Channel 12, VHF Channel 24
- Coverage: 99% of the country, with limited gaps in certain areas of the Northern Province
- International coverage: Live online streaming via The ITN Channel Online

Vasantham TV

- Frequencies: VHF Channel 9, UHF Channel 25
- Coverage: Western Province, Northern Province, Eastern Province
- International coverage: Live online streaming via Vasantham TV Online

Prime TV

- Frequencies: UHF Channel 24
- Coverage: Western Province
- International coverage: Live online streaming via Prime TV Online

Lakhanda

- Frequencies and coverage: 97.6 MHz – Colombo and Southern Province; 87.9 MHz – Northern Province; and 88.5 MHz – Islandwide
- International coverage: Live online streaming via Lakhanda Radio Online

Vasantham FM

- Frequencies and coverage: 97.6 MHz – Colombo, 97.0 MHz – other selected regions
- International coverage: Live online streaming via Vasantham FM Online

Prime Radio

- Frequencies and coverage: 104.5 MHz – Colombo, 95.5 MHz – Kandy, 99.0 MHz – Galle
- International coverage: Live online streaming via Prime Radio Online

== Logo ==
ITN's logo, which until the June 1979 government takeover, read TV Sri Lanka, was designed by S. H. Sarath. After that, Jayath Janasuriya revised it, replacing "TV" with "ITN" and adding the channel name in Sinhala and Tamil. In December 1999, when Newton Gunaratne became president of the network, the logo underwent a drastic redesign, resembling an awanak fan, in red, green and blue. This did not last long and was replaced within months by a new one, depicting a purple lily and the channel's initials in black written inside red (I), green (T) and blue (N) circles. It was replaced by a purple symbol on 7 April 2001, putting more emphasis on the lily, the national flower. On February 8, 2002, the old ITN logo was restored.

== See also ==
- List of television networks in Sri Lanka
- List of radio networks in Sri Lanka
- Media of Sri Lanka
