= Varnam FM =

Starதமிழ் FM
- Sri Lanka
- Broadcast area: Sri Lanka
- Frequency: Islandwide 90.4MHz,90.6MHz

Programming
- Language: Tamil
- Format: Tamil music

Ownership
- Owner: Voice of Asia Network(Pvt)Ltd.
- Sister stations: Siyatha FM, Varnam FM, Kiss FM (Sri Lanka), Siyatha TV

History
- First air date: 11 February 2008

Links
- Website: Varnam FM Official Website

Star தமிழ் FM is a Tamil radio station in Sri Lanka. The channel started broadcasting on 11 February 2008 as Vettri FM.

Star தமிழ் FM reached number 1 in Greater Colombo area in the LMRB ratings released in May 2011.
