= ART Television (Sri Lanka) =

Sri Lankan television channel

Art Television Broadcasting Co.
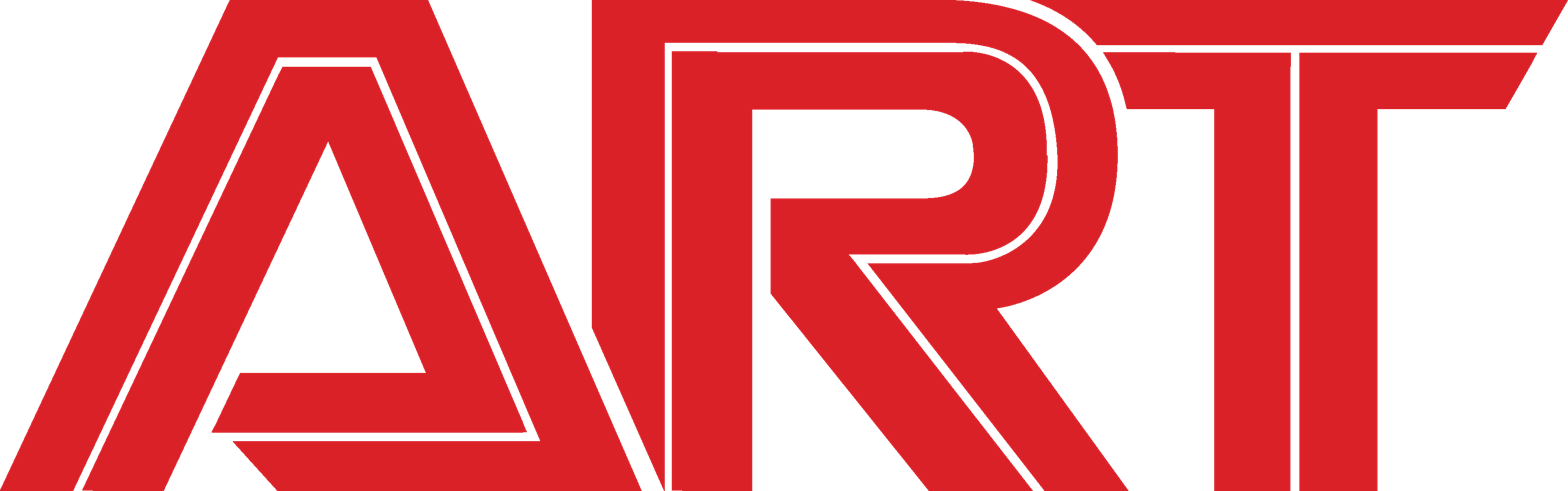
- Country: Sri Lanka
- Headquarters: 451, Kandy Road, Kelaniya

Programming
- Language: English

Ownership
- Owner: IWS Holdings (Private) Limited

History
- Launched: 12 December 1995
- Former names: Dynavision Broadcasting Corporation

Links
- Website: iwsholdings.com

Availability

Terrestrial
- UHF (Colombo): Channel 28

Art Television Broadcasting Co. is a 24-hour analogue terrestrial (free to air) television channel in Sri Lanka. A privately owned channel that broadcasts English content has its headquarters located in Colombo. Its coverage is viewed on Frequencies UHF – CH28 in Colombo and UHF – CH52 in Kandy. ART Television is owned by the Sri Lankan business conglomerate IWS Holdings (Private) Limited founded by Indulakshin Wickramasinghe Senanayake.

== Content ==
Affiliated with CNN since 1995, the Channel offers 15 hours of CNN daily. It partnered with Cartoon Network in 2009, and relays a daily hour of Cartoon Network on its children's belt ART Toons, in addition to varied entertainment content sourced from leading international suppliers. The station partnered with Cartoon Network in 2009 to launch an eco-awareness campaign in Kandy, which was the first local CSR campaign supported by an international children's channel.

The Channel's daily news bulletin the State of Business is a key business current affairs program in Sri Lanka and conducts prominent business forums. The company has also ventured into local reality series platform partnering with The Model Network, Sri Lanka and Ford Models, New York for the Ford Supermodel of Sri Lanka search. It has collaborated with the British Council in Colombo for the entrepreneurial reality show Ideators in 2010.

== History ==
Originally incorporated as Dynavision Broadcasting Corporation in 1995, the station introduced Sri Lanka's first stereo broadcast station. The company was repositioned as Art Television Broadcasting Company in July 2003.

Uoosoof Mohideen, who was the CNN representative for Sri Lanka, was the first CEO/Managing Director for Dynavision. Uoosoof Mohideen was also a founding member/partner of ETV (Sri Lanka).

== See also ==
- List of television networks in Sri Lanka
- Media in Sri Lanka
