= Shree FM =

Sri Lankan radio station

Sri FM (ශ්‍රී FM) is the first privately owned radio station in Sri Lanka. This radio is broadcast island wide in Sri Lanka on the frequencies 93.2FM, 95.8FM, 98.8FM, 99.0FM and 99.3FM.

Shree FM, Ran FM and E FM's Executive Director, is Ryan Honter.

== History ==
It began as FM99. I was started by veteran broadcaster Livi Wijemanne (the owner of the frequency 99 MHz), It was later renamed Shree FM when it was taken over by E. A. P. Edirisingha (Pvt) Ltd. The firm owns Swarnavahini and ETV Television Channels. Its English counterpart channel, E FM, is broadcast from Colombo on FM 100.4 MHz.

Shree FM was awarded the People's Radio Channel and the People's Youth Radio Channel at the People's SLIM Awards 2007 - Sri Lanka.

Colombo Communications Ltd, runs Shree and e FM. CCL won the most prestigious award in radio, the National Association of Broadcasters (NAB is based in Washington D.C) - International Broadcast Excellence Award.

In 2019, EAP Broadcasting Company parent company EAP Holdings was acquired by Lyca Group. EAP Broadcasting Company is a subsidiary of Ben Holdings along with Lyca Productions.

== See also ==
- E FM
- Swarnavahini
- List of radio networks in Sri Lanka
