= UTV Tamil =

Tamil language television channel

UTV or Udhayam TV
- Country: Sri Lanka
- Broadcast area: Sri Lanka
- Headquarters: Colombo

Programming
- Language(s): Tamil
- Picture format: 576i

History
- Launched: 23 March 2017

Links
- Website: www.utv.lk

Udhayam TV (Tamil: உதயம் தொலைக்காட்சி; also known as UTV) is a Tamil language television channel which broadcasts in Sri Lanka. The channel is operated by the SATIS Agency (Pvt) Ltd which is a broadcaster in Sri Lanka. The channel commenced transmission on 23 March 2017. This television channel primarily broadcasts content in the Tamil language, catering to the media requirements of the Tamil-speaking community within Sri Lanka.

== Frequency and coverage ==
UTV broadcasts to the Western Province of Sri Lanka on VHF channel (Unknown) transmitting via UHF channel (Unknown) and UTV expand its coverage island wide soon. Furthermore, viewers can stream the channel live, online via the UTV website. now its Name Changed as Thriwidha TV, and there News Brand is Thriwidha24. There will be News in Both (Sinhala & Tamil) Languages in Thriwidha24.

== See also ==
- Television in Sri Lanka
- Media in Sri Lanka
