= TV Supreme =

Sri Lankan television channel

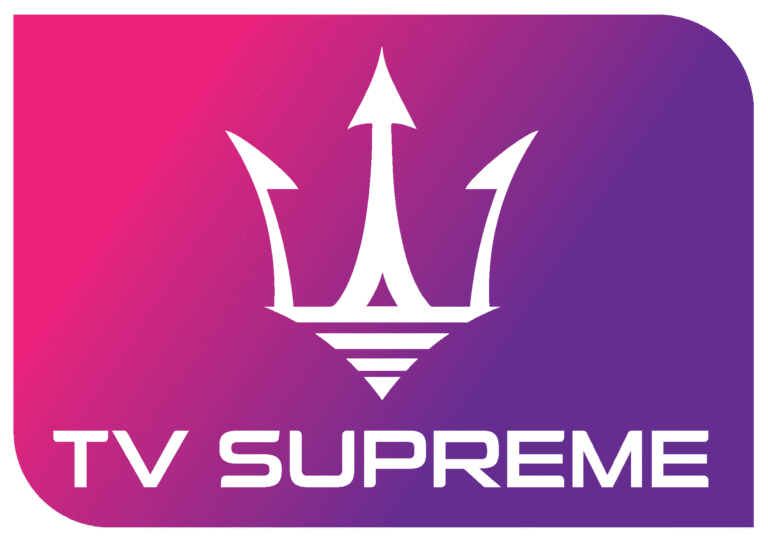
- Country: Sri Lanka
- Broadcast area: Sri Lanka
- Headquarters: West Tower, World Trade Center, Colombo

Programming
- Language: Sinhala
- Picture format: (PAL) 576i (4:3) (SDTV)

Ownership
- Owner: Supreme Global Holdings
- Key people: R M Manivannan (Chairman)

History
- Launched: 16 December 2019
- Former names: Supreme

Links
- Website: www.tvsupreme.lk

TV Supreme is a television channel currently broadcasting in Sri Lanka in the Sinhala language. It is owned by Supreme Global Holdings and it consists of the DVB-T2 pictures and stereo sounds. It currently holds all island coverage. Its programme content includes: Teledramas, International TV Series, Music, Movies, Documentaries, Entertainment, Political, Children's Programmes and News. The channel airs content mainly focusing on entertainment and sports. It was launched by Supreme Global Holdings. R. M. Manivannan is the chairman of the channel. Famous celebrity and the experienced communication strategist Kanchana Kodituwakku is the director of the Supreme Television.

== Background ==
The channel was originally restricted to the Western Province and the operations of the channel were later expanded islandwide especially during the COVID-19 pandemic. In June 2021, the channel launched Supreme Educare project focusing on the students who study at the Ordinary Level.

The channel bagged the broadcasting rights as local channel partner in Sri Lanka for the two match T20I series between Oman and Sri Lanka which was held in Al Amerat Cricket Stadium, Muscat. It also airs 2021 South Asian Football Championships.

It also acquired the exclusive local broadcasting rights to telecast the second edition of the Lanka Premier League which is scheduled to begin in December 2021. Sri Lanka Cricket and Innovative Production Group apparently sealed a five-year multi-million dollar agreement worth US$10 million with Supreme TV which is also regarded as one of the biggest broadcasting deals in Sri Lanka's history.

The channel telecast Sri Lanka Tour of India Sri Lanka territories. New Zealand v Sri Lanka Test match 2023

In April 2024, Supreme Media entered into an alliance with TNL TV.

== Availability ==
- VHF 11 (217.25 MHz) - Piliyandala
- UHF 21 (471.25 MHz) - Colombo
- VHF 04 (62.25 MHz) - Kandy Light
- UHF 26 (511.25 MHz) - Gongala
- UHF 26 (511.25 MHz) - Kandy
- VHF 11 (217.25 MHz) - Kargahathanna
- UHF 21 (471.25 MHz)- Badulla
- UHF 26 (511.25 MHz) - Ratnapura
- UHF 26 (511.25 MHz) - Avissawella

- Freesat (Satellite TV)
  - Channel 17
- Peo TV (Pay TV)
  - Channel 13
- Dialog TV (Satellite Pay TV)
  - Channel 12

== Sports Telecasted In Sri Lanka ==
Year	Sports event	Note
2021	Sri Lankan cricket team in Oman in 2021–22	
2021	2021 SAFF Championship	
2021	2021 Lanka Premier League	
2023	2023 Indian Premier League	
2023	2023 US Masters T10 League	
2023	2023 Abu Dhabi T10	
2023	2023–24 Big Bash League season	
2024	2024 International League T20	
2024	2024 Indian Premier League	
2024	2024 Women's Twenty20 Asia Cup	
2024	Sri Lankan cricket team in England in 2024	
2024	New Zealand cricket team in Sri Lanka in 2024–25	
2024	West Indian cricket team in Sri Lanka in 2024–25	
2024	Pakistani cricket team in Australia in 2024–25	
2024	Indian cricket team in Australia in 2024–25	
2024	2024 Abu Dhabi T10	
2024	2024–25 Big Bash League season	
2025	2025 International League T20	
2025	2025 Indian Premier League	
2025	2025 Caribbean Premier League	
2025	Sri Lankan cricket team in Zimbabwe in 2025	
2026	2026 Men's T20 World Cup	
2026	2026 Indian Premier League	
2026	2026 Women's T20 World Cup	

== See also ==
- Digital Television
- 1080p
- Full HD
