= Sri Lanka Rupavahini Corporation =

National television network of Sri Lanka

- The original logo of the SLRC, reverted to since October 2022
- Type: Government-owned corporation
- Industry: Mass media Entertainment
- Founded: 14 February 1982; 44 years ago
- Area served: Sri Lanka
- Key people: Titus Thotawatte; Rosmand Senaratne; Mayura Samarasinghe
- Revenue: ▲ Rs 1.951 billion (2015)
- Operating income: ▲ Rs−338.9 million (2015)
- Net income: ▲ Rs−371.7 million (2015)
- Total assets: ▼ Rs1.985 billion (2015)
- Total equity: ▼ Rs1.219 billion (2015)
- Number of employees: ▲1,030 (2015)
- Parent: Ministry of Information and Mass Media
- Subsidiaries: Channel Eye; Nethra TV; NTV
- Website: www.rupavahini.lk

Jathika Rupavahini
- Type: Television network
- Country: Sri Lanka
- Availability: National
- Founded: 14 February 1982; 44 years ago
- Owner: Sri Lanka Rupavahini Corporation
- Launch date: 15 February 1982; 44 years ago
- Official website: www.rupavahini.lk
- Language: Sinhala, English

The Sri Lanka Rūpavāhinī Corporation (Sinhala: ශ්‍රී ලංකා රූපවාහිනී සංස්ථාව; Tamil: இலங்கை ரூபவாகினி கூட்டுத்தாபனம்), also known as Jathika Rupavahini (lit. National Television) or simply as Rupavahini, is the national television network of Sri Lanka. Rupavahini literally means "purveyor of images" in the Sinhala language.

Established by Parliament under Act No. 6 of 1982 for the provision of national television service, Rupavahini produces and broadcasts programmes in three languages. Distinguished civil servant M. J. Perera was the founder and chairman of Sri Lanka Rupavahini Corporation (SLRC).

SLRC is the largest television broadcaster in Sri Lanka, and its channels can be received island-wide. SLRC broadcasts its channels in both VHF and UHF frequencies in Sri Lanka. The network's services are only available by analogue transmission, with plans to upgrade to digital broadcasting. Beginning in 2011, the Kokavil tower began to broadcast in DVB-T2 for the Northern Province. There were plans to transmit DVB-T2 digital television all over the country in 2015. By 2021, however, the government had switched to a plan to use ISDB-T after receiving aid from the Japanese Foreign Ministry.

== History ==
While Sri Lanka had no television services until 1979, proposals for their creation date to 1965. These early proposals were rejected by Dudley Senanayake's government, whose media advisors, led by Neville Jayaweera, called television "a gift of a rhinoceros". The idea resurfaced by 1977, and, in early 1978, President J. R. Jayewardene held talks with technicians of the Japanese Nippon Electric Company, accepting proposals from German and French electronics companies to be their suppliers. According to Japanese law, the national television service was to be a public service television station and not a commercial service.

President J. R. Jayewardene approved the creation of the national television service on 4 March 1980.

Rūpavāhinī was created under a government act on 23 January 1982 and established on 14 February. Rupavahini began broadcasting the next day, on 15 February 1982 opening with a speech from J. R. Jayewardene. Funding was donated by the Japanese government, and both transmitters were built and installed by Japanese technicians. Broadcasts initially started at 6:00 pm with a daily segment for children and ended at 11:00 pm. There were three daily news bulletins, with a Tamil edition at 7:00 pm, a Sinhala edition at 8:15 pm, and an English edition at 9:30 pm. Sinhala-language feature films were broadcast once a month. By 1985, broadcasts started earlier at 5:30 pm, with news slots remaining unchanged. Educational programmes for classrooms were an initial focus, with free television sets offered to the 500 schools teaching "advanced level science and mathematics".

Early on, service could be received in the Indian state of Tamil Nadu under good weather conditions. Viewers preferred Rupavahini over Doordarshan's local station, especially for agricultural and children's programming. The relays were often jammed by a Doordarshan relayer in Trivandrum in Kerala. Rupavahini's popularity led to the purchase of colour television sets in southern India before the rest of the country started regular services. Newspapers started publishing schedules for the station. Per a 1984 government order, Rupavahini reduced the power of its transmitters as the channel did not compensate its audience in India via overspill by attracting Indian advertisers. Viewer preference in India continued even after Doordarshan implemented its colour service. Its foreign programmes were also attractive.

In 1986, Rupavahini expanded its facilities and, in 1998, rehabilitated most of the original equipment using digital technology under three grant aid projects from the Government of Japan. Its studio complex is in Colombo, the commercial capital of Sri Lanka. The complex comprises a master control room, four studios, two dubbing studios, a digital post-production unit, two analogue post-production units, several editing suites including non-linear editing, and four outside broadcast vehicles.

In the 1980s and 1990s, Rupavahini aired a number of dubbed cartoons led by Titus Thotawatte, the most notable being Bugs Bunny (Ha Ha Hari Hawa), Doctor Dolittle (Dosthara Honda Hitha), and Top Cat (Pissu Pusa). These continued to air on Rupavahini for years.

Rupavahini reopened two relays in Kokavil and Palavi in 1994. The channel limited its coverage of the 1998 FIFA World Cup to delays due to its priority on cricket matches, the national sport.

'Rupavahini 2' launched in April 1999 before it changed its name to the current 'Channel Eye' in August 2000.

The corporation signed a historic agreement with Canal France International on 28 July 2004.

On 1 January 2008, Channel Eye became a time-shared channel, alternating with the newly created Nethra TV. In 2009, series of Rupavahini productions became available in DVD and VCD formats under the title "RU Entertainments". Rupavahini is the first Sri Lankan channel to telecast foreign teledramas. The most popular of them was Oshin, a Japanese teledrama dubbed in Sinhala. The channel telecast the first Korean drama to air in the country, Sujatha Diyani (also known as Dae Jang Geum), in November 2012.

In December 2014, the main channel was made available via satellite to Europe (via Eutelsat 70B), prompting the channel to temporarily go 24/7 (still doing the formal start and end of transmission routines) to alleviate time zone differences. Due to unknown reasons, the channel was removed. The channel now starts up shortly before 04:00 SLST (UTC+05:30) and closes down shortly after midnight.

The new monolingual Rupavahini logo that was introduced in February 2022. It was reverted in October of the same year to the original.

On 22 February 2022, Rupavahini changed its logo, altering the shape and removing the Tamil and English names of the network, leaving only the Sinhala version. The previous edition was restored in October of that year after pushback from activists. On 13 July 2022, after protesters stormed the network's headquarters, operations temporarily ceased after playing the national anthem.

On 14 February 2024, employees walked out due to unpaid salaries and accumulated debt.

== Channels ==
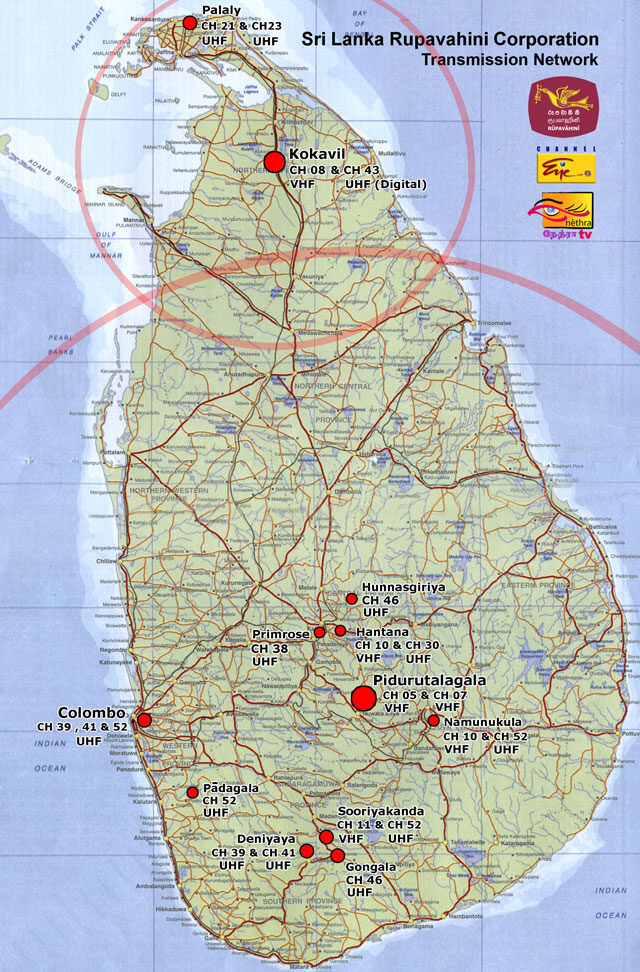
2015 coverage map of SLRC services

The SLRC operates three channels.

- Rupavahini is the main channel, in Sinhala. It transmits on a 20-hour schedule and features news, teledramas, educational programming, discussion shows, and imported programming.
- Channel Eye is the English-language and sports channel. It airs a wide range of original productions and sporting events. Initially, it telecast documentaries from Discovery Channel and international and local sports programmes, mainly cricket, volleyball, and motorcar racing. It was the official TV broadcaster for five Cricket World Cup tournaments: 1996, 2003, 2007, 2011, and 2015.
- Nethra TV (nethra is Tamil for "eye") is the Tamil language channel, started in 2008. Initially broadcast on Channel Eye's frequencies between 07:30 and 21:00, it has been separate since 20 February 2018. It focuses on Tamil culture and customs with original and acquired programming, including Tamil serials. It also airs religious programming, aimed especially at religious minorities.
- Between 2009 and 2015, a fourth channel, NTV, was operated by the corporation and aired exclusively English content. Eventually NTV was shut down on 21 February 2015 due to low ratings.
- Ru Radio is a digital radio station that started broadcasting in February 2024. It was launched at a time when Rupavahini was the target of criticism from politicians and employees due to alleged mismanagement.

=== Rupavahini transmitters ===
All transmitters are in analogue.

City	Channel
Pidurutalagala	5
Namunukula	10
Rajagiriya	52
Padagala	52
Hanthana	10
Deniyaya	41
Sooriyakanda	11
Namunukula	10
Primrose	38
Hunnasgiriya	46
Palaly	21
Kokavil	43

== Management and funding ==
Rupavahini is an autonomous corporation run by a chairman, director-general, and a board of directors appointed by the president.

Until 1998, Rupavahini was funded by a licence fee system: every television owner with at least VHF reception had to pay the government a yearly fee. After an act of parliament, the licence fee was scrapped and the funding of Rupavahini was changed to a system of government grants supplemented by TV advertising.

== Identity ==
=== Test card ===
Telefunken FuBK variant used by Rupavahini.

From its launch in 1982 to the conversion to HD in November 2022, Rupavahini has used a slightly modified version of the German Telefunken FuBK colour test card during non-broadcast hours. The pink and purple bars are solid and the text (RUPAVAHINI-SRI LANKA) is set to half-width.

=== Logo ===
Logo of the Rupavahini channel, used by the corporation until 24 February 2022. The monolingual logo is still used by the corporation but the trilingual logo was restored to the main channel in October 2022

Rupavahini's logo, designed by artist and painter Bandula Peiris, depicts a hill mynah carrying a message in gold on a red TV screen. The bird's wings represent VHF and UHF television aerials, and the semi-circle holding the wings represents a satellite dish. The bottom of the message contains a hidden feature which, if rotated, reveals Bandula's initial "බ" in square format. Apart from a few months in 2022, the channel's name in Sinhala (රූපවාහිනී), Tamil (ரூபவாஹினி), and a transliteration of Sinhala with macrons (RŪPAVĀHINĪ), appeared below. The leaf in the right wing was incorporated into NTV's previous symbol and is incorporated into trophies held at award shows organized by the corporation, the Ape Gamana logo, and the SLRC's news operation. The logo of Rupavahini's children's club, Muthuhara, was also Peiris' creation.

A news item on the logo was seen on the Sinhala, Tamil, and English news bulletins on launch day. The logo was a source of contention for another designer who, over a five-year period, threatened to sue both the corporation and advertising agency behind its creation. During this time, only Peiris could provide evidence.

In the early years, the station's starting animation consisted of the line drawing of the bird and an aerial shot of the facilities.

At start-up, a slide (static until the conversion to widescreen) with the Rupavahini logo appears, accompanied by an instrumental rendition of Kawurudo ara Kawuluwen by singer-songwriter Sanath Nandasiri. The bird appears towards the end of the channel's nightly end-of-transmission sequence, flying past the transmitter at Rupavahini's headquarters. The sequence is followed by the national anthem.

On 24 February 2022, coinciding with changes to Rupavahini News, the channel changed its logo for the first time; the bird was kept intact but the screen was replaced by a rounded rectangle and the Tamil and English forms of the name were removed. Following internal and external pressure, Rupavahini reverted these changes that October.

== Controversies ==
In 2007, then-government minister Mervyn Silva and his bodyguards stormed the Rupavahini and attacked the news director. Employees then attacked Silva.

On 13 July 2022, protesters claiming to be leaders of the 2022 Sri Lankan protests entered the premises and demanded all scheduled programmes be stopped, and only content related to the protests be broadcast. The channel was off air for a short period during the time of the incident. Later that day, two of the protesters were allowed to express their opinions on a live breaking news–themed programme. At 1:31 pm the channel was temporarily taken off the air and did an improvised closedown, by playing the usual routine: the Rupavahini ID, the nightly end of transmission video and the national anthem.

== See also ==
- List of television networks in Sri Lanka
- List of radio networks in Sri Lanka
- Media in Sri Lanka
- Sri Lanka Broadcasting Corporation
