= Wickramasinghapura =

Wickramasinghapura වික්‍රමසිංහපුර விக்கிரமசிங்கபுர
- Suburb
- Location within Sri Lanka
- Coordinates: 6°51′28″N 79°57′42″E
- Country: Sri Lanka
- Province: Western Province
- District: Colombo District
- Time zone: UTC+5:30 (Sri Lanka Standard Time Zone)

Wickramasinghapura (Sinhala: වික්‍රමසිංහපුර, Tamil: விக்கிரமசிங்கபுர) or Wickramasinghepura is a suburb located within Battaramulla in the Western Province of Sri Lanka. It is a suburb of Colombo attached to the Kaduwela Municipal Council. Wickramasinghapura is located in between Pelawatte and Thalawathugoda. Independent Television Network (ITN) is located in Wickramasinghapura.

On a clear day, Adam's Peak is visible from Wickramasinghapura which is located almost on the west coast of Sri Lanka, as it is one of the tallest hills in the Colombo District.
