= Lakhanda radio =

Lakhanda (Voice of Lanka) is a Sri Lankan radio station. It was started on 15 November 1996, under the ownership of Sri Lanka Broadcasting Corporation. Eventually the channel was amalgamated to ITN (Independent Television Network) on 1997 April 1 on a government cabinet decision. The programmes were transmitted on 93.5 F.M. and 93.7 F.M. from transmitting points at Yatiyanthota, Karagahatenna, Bandarawela, Deniyaya and Colombo. Lakhanda was renamed as ITN FM by its main government body Independent Television Network Ltd (ITN)

Lakhanda broadcasts programmes for Sinhala speaking audience in Sri Lanka. Its islandwide transmission opens daily at 04:30 hrs. and closes down at 00:15 hrs. local time. Lakhanda is the radio wing of the Independent Television Network Ltd (ITN) the pioneer in Sri Lanka's television. The programme contents are news and current affairs, politics, sports, education, cultural, health, women, economics and music.

== History ==
Programmes were commenced at 0500 a.m. in the first instance and then at 4:30 a.m. currently, until 12 midnight. From the tenth anniversary, which falls on 15 November 2006, it is proposed to transmit programmes for 24 hours.

One of the salient commemorative events anniversary held include the community development services via mass media channels rendered to villages. The first such event took place in 1997 November 15 at Mahavilacchi in Anuradhapura.

The second anniversary carried some of the supportive development projects for the Army officers in Vanuniya.

The third anniversary was the implementation of an Intensive Care Unit. In this Manner annually a series of community media oriented projects were implemented. The memorable event was the use of TV & Radio for tsunami victims.

At the outset there were four news broadcasts and gradually increased to 5 broadcasts per day apart from these news broadcasts an hourly news bulletin on National and international events were covered. The headlines of the main news bulletin were broadcast 15 minutes before the specified time. In this news bulletin covered business news, provincial news and news dispatches from abroad.
