= Dish TV (Sri Lanka) =

Satellite pay TV service

Dish TV Lanka
- Formerly: Dish TV Sri Lanka
- Company type: Subsidiary
- Industry: Pay TV
- Fate: Ceased operations
- Headquarters: Colombo, Sri Lanka
- Area served: Sri Lanka
- Products: Direct Broadcast Satellite
- Parent: DishTV India Ltd.

Dish TV Lanka, Satnet was a pay TV satellite provider based in Sri Lanka. A fully owned subsidiary of DishTV India, Dish TV Sri Lanka was launched in 2015. However, the company ceased its operations in Sri Lanka due to heavy losses in 2019. Few channels were aired as Free To Air after disputes raised by its users for the sudden shutdown of services until July 2020 when the service was completely shutdown.

== See also ==
- Dialog TV
- List of television networks in Sri Lanka
