= Vasantham TV =

Sri Lankan television channel

Vasantham TV வசந்தம் தொலைக்காட்சி
- Country: Sri Lanka
- Broadcast area: Sri Lanka

Programming
- Language: Tamil
- Picture format: 576i

Ownership
- Owner: Independent Television Network
- Sister channels: ITN

Links
- Website: Vasantham TV Online

Availability

Terrestrial
- VHF (Colombo) (FTA): Channel 10
- VHF (Kokavil) (FTA): Channel 10
- UHF (Palaly) (FTA): Channel 21
- UHF (Madolsima) (FTA): Channel 24
- TV Lanka Digital TV (Pay TV): Channel 12

Vasantham TV (Tamil: வசந்தம் தொலைக்காட்சி) (also known as Wasanthan TV) is a Tamil language television channel which broadcasts in Sri Lanka. The channel is operated by the Independent Television Network Limited (ITN Ltd), which is a state governed television and radio broadcaster in Sri Lanka. The channel commenced transmission on 25 June 2009. This television channel primarily broadcasts content in the Tamil language, catering to the media requirements of the Tamil-speaking community within Sri Lanka.

== Frequency and coverage ==
Vasantham TV broadcasts to the Western Province of Sri Lanka on VHF channel 10. The channel extended its coverage to the North and East of Sri Lanka on 6 January 2010, transmitting via UHF channel 25 and Vasantham TV expand its coverage island wide soon. Furthermore, viewers can stream the channel live, online via the ITN website.

== See also ==
- List of television networks in Sri Lanka
- Media in Sri Lanka
- Independent Television Network Limited
