= Shan Wickremesinghe =

Sri Lankan media proprietor (born 1947)

Shan Wickremesinghe ශාන් වික්‍රමසිංහ
- Born: Shanthilal Nilkantha Wickremesinghe; 20 December 1947 (age 78); Colombo, Dominion of Ceylon
- Education: Royal College, Colombo
- Occupations: Television broadcaster; Media proprietor; Businessman
- Years active: 1968-Present
- Known for: Founding and leading the ITN
- Title: Founder and chairman of Telshan Network
- Children: 1
- Parents: Esmond Wickremesinghe; Nalini Wickremesinghe
- Relatives: Ranil Wickremesinghe (brother); Ruwan Wijewardene (cousin)

Deshabandu Shanthilal Nilkantha Wickremesinghe, popularly known as Shan Wickremesinghe (born 20 December 1947), is a Sri Lankan media proprietor, television presenter and a broadcast engineer. He is the founder of Sri Lanka's first television station ITN and the current chairman of TNL TV television and radio network. He is the older brother of the former President of Sri Lanka, Ranil Wickremesinghe.

== Personal life ==
He was born on 20 December 1947 in Colombo as the eldest of the family. His parents were Esmond Wickremesinghe and Nalini Wickremesinghe née Wijewardena. His father was an ex-Lanka Sama Samaja Party lawyer who became a media proprietor taking over the Associated Newspapers of Ceylon Limited. His grandfathers were Cyril Wickremesinghe and D. R. Wijewardena. Shan completed education from Royal College, Colombo. Then he graduated from the Faraday and North London Polytechnic Institute of Higher Education in England with the subject Television and Audio Engineering.

Shan has three younger brothers – Ranil Wickremesinghe, Niraj Wickremesinghe, Channa Wickremesinghe and one younger sister, Kshanika Wickremesinghe. His uncle Lakshman Wickremasinghe was the former Bishop of Kurunegala.

His brother Ranil served as Prime Minister in three terms: from 1993 to 1994, from 2001 to 2004 and from 2015 to 2019. Ranil Wickremesinghe is married to Maitree Wickremasinghe, Sri Lankan academic and professor of English in 1994. Shan's sister Kshanika is the Legal Director of TNL. Brother Niraj is the Chairman of TNL Radio. The youngest brother Channa runs "Varna" Printing Press in Ratmalana.

His brother's State Minister of Defense Ruwan Wijewardene, State Minister of Foreign Affairs Wasantha Senanayake and his aunt Sri Lanka High Commissioner to the United Kingdom Amari Wijewardene are some of his relatives in government servants.

Shan is married and the couple has one daughter, Ishini.

== Career ==
During the working days of industrial electronics, there was an American show about Colombo television in the 1950s while he was a student. When he watched it, he was attracted to television and radio. During his four years as secretary in the Radio circle of the school, Shan taught the younger students about radio and how to make it in practice. Meanwhile, his father realized that he was working towards the radio in this way whereas Shan was sent to "Shard House School" in England to learn more. But it closed in about a year. Students were sent to other colleges to study and Shan was referred to North Texan College. During this period, he met a Sri Lankan person, Ivan Siriwardena. On Ivan's acquaintance, Shan learned to make televisions from an old Indian television maker, which was during the era of black-n-white television. In the meantime, he was able to pass the Amada Television Sound exam, which gave a certificate that he could sit at home and do TV shows.

While returning Sri Lanka from vacation in 1968, Vernon Correa of the Broadcasting Corporation gave me a hint. Correa said that according to Article 35 (17), a television channel can be licensed in Sri Lanka. They went to meet the then Prime Minister Dudley Senanayake to talk about the matter along with Ranjith Wijewardene. However, the licence could not pass during Senanayake's government. Later, Sirimavo Bandaranaike saw Shan's presentation and gave the opportunity to telecast the Non-Aligned Movement. During 1968/69, Shan brought Sony television to Sri Lanka.

Meanwhile, late president J.R. Jayawardane's government also did not licensed Shan's proposal. After many arguments and debates, he was asked to pay Rs. 100,000 before December 1, 1979 and told to start on April 13. Otherwise the license would be revoked. But without the technical equipment building, he was in a lot of trouble. During the constructions, a man died while working on a 45-foot tower. On 13 April 1979, the young monks of Gangarama came to recite Pirith and Sri Lanka's first television station was commenced at 6.30 pm with the name Independent Television Network (ITN). ITN is the first ever terrestrial television channel to be telecast in Sri Lanka. However, ITN was able to provide its broadcasting services under the leadership of Shan only for eight weeks, where President Jayewardene’s Government converted ITN to a State owned property on June 5, 1979 by a special gazette.

Later, Shan established TNL TV on 21 June 1993. TNL became the first private television broadcaster in Sri Lanka. In 2018, TNL celebrated its 25th anniversary. In 1970, Shan launched a record production company called "Sangeetha" where the first disc was made for Gypsies Sunil Perera. He also produced discs under the Surya label.

On 15 December 2015, a felicitation ceremony was organised at the Bandaranaike Memorial International Conference Hall (BMICH) by Telshan Networks (Pvt) Ltd. to felicitate the Chairman of TNL Shan Wickremesinghe. In 2016, Shan received the Lifetime Achievement Award from President Maithripala Sirisena at the Rupavahini State Awards.

In 2018, Polgahawela Broadcasting Center of TNL has been suspended by Telecommunications Regulatory Commission (TRC) due to broadcasting without obtaining a Frequency License since 2013. It was further stated that the location license and antenna pattern license have not been obtained for that.
