= Sri Lankan cricket team in Oman in 2021–22 =

International cricket tour

Sri Lanka cricket team in Oman in 2021–22
	Oman	Sri Lanka
- Dates: 7 – 9 October 2021
Captains	Zeeshan Maqsood	Dasun Shanaka

Twenty20 International series
- Results: Sri Lanka won the 2-match series 2–0
Most runs	Aqib Ilyas (62)	Avishka Fernando (116)
Most wickets	Fayyaz Butt (3)	Lahiru Kumara (6)

The Sri Lanka national cricket team toured Oman in October 2021 to play two twenty-over matches. The matches were played in Muscat, Oman, with both teams using the fixtures as their preparations for the 2021 ICC Men's T20 World Cup. The series was confirmed by Sri Lanka Cricket CEO Ashley de Silva and Oman coach Duleep Mendis. Sri Lanka won the first match by 19 runs, and the second match by five wickets to win the series 2–0.

== Squads ==
T20s
Oman	Sri Lanka
Zeeshan Maqsood (c); Aqib Ilyas (vc); Khawar Ali; Fayyaz Butt; Nestor Dhamba; Sandeep Goud; Kaleemullah; Ayaan Khan; Bilal Khan; Suraj Kumar; Naseem Khushi; Sufyan Mehmood; Mohammad Nadeem; Khurram Nawaz; Kashyap Prajapati; Jatinder Singh	Dasun Shanaka (c); Dhananjaya de Silva (vc); Charith Asalanka; Minod Bhanuka; Dinesh Chandimal (wk); Dushmantha Chameera; Akila Dananjaya; Avishka Fernando; Binura Fernando; Wanindu Hasaranga; Praveen Jayawickrama; Chamika Karunaratne; Lahiru Kumara; Kamindu Mendis; Kusal Perera; Nuwan Pradeep; Bhanuka Rajapaksa; Pulina Tharanga; Maheesh Theekshana

As well as the players selected in Sri Lanka's T20 World Cup squad, including their reserve players, Ramesh Mendis, Pathum Nissanka, Ashen Bandara and Lakshan Sandakan were also included as additional players.

== T20 series ==
=== 1st T20 ===
7 October 2021
14:30
Scorecard

Sri Lanka; 162/4 (20 overs)	v	Oman; 143/8 (20 overs)
Avishka Fernando 83* (59); Fayyaz Butt 2/42 (4 overs)		Naseem Khushi 40 (22); Lahiru Kumara 4/30 (4 overs)

Sri Lanka won by 19 runs
Oman Cricket Academy Ground Turf 1, Muscat
Umpires: Rahul Asher (Oma) and Vinod Babu (Oma)
Player of the match: Avishka Fernando (SL)

- Oman won the toss and elected to field.

=== 2nd T20 ===
9 October 2021
18:30 (N)
Scorecard

Oman; 159/8 (20 overs)	v	Sri Lanka; 163/5 (17.3 overs)
Aqib Ilyas 59 (38); Lahiru Kumara 2/20 (4 overs)		Bhanuka Rajapaksa 35* (21); Mohammad Nadeem 2/22 (3 overs)

Sri Lanka won by 5 wickets
Oman Cricket Academy Ground Turf 1, Muscat
Umpires: Rahul Asher (Oma) and Vinod Babu (Oma)
Player of the match: Aqib Ilyas (Oma)

- Sri Lanka won the toss and elected to field.
