= TNL TV =

Sri Lankan television network

- Country: Sri Lanka
- Broadcast area: Sri Lanka
- Affiliates: No affiliations
- Headquarters: 7B Tower Building, 25 Station Road, Colombo 4

Programming
- Languages: English, Sinhala

Ownership
- Owner: Telshan Network (PVT) Ltd.
- Key people: Shan Wickremesinghe

History
- Launched: 21 June 1993; 32 years ago

Links
- Website: tnltv.lk

TNL TV is an English and Sinhala-language television station in Sri Lanka, owned by Telshan Network. Launched in 1993, TNL TV was one of Sri Lanka's first privately owned television channels. Shan Wickremesinghe, the chairman of Telshan Network, is the brother of former President Ranil Wickremesinghe. TNL broadcasts from 6 am to midnight everyday.

== History ==
Shan Wickremesinghe's involvement in television is not new; he was the owner of ITN Sri Lanka from 13 April 1979 until 5 June 1979 when it was put under state intervention. TNL started broadcasting on 21 June 1993.

The channel started airing a leased block for teledramas, CTV, on 31 January 2018.

In April 2024, Supreme Media formed a partnership with TNL. With this alliance, Supreme Media expanded itself into a media network with two TV channels which includes Supreme TV and TNL (which subsequently got rebranded as TNL Supreme), along with a radio station and three digital channels.

== Broadcasting ==
TNL TV is available on free-to-air analog terrestrial transmission on the following channels:

- VHF:
  - 3 (Piliyandala, Polgahawela)
  - 4 (Nuwara Eliya)
  - 11 (Karagahatenna)
- UHF:
  - 21 (Badulla, Bambalapitiya)
  - 26 (Hantana, Gongala, Ratnapura)

The transmitter at Polgahawela was seized in 2018 by the Telecommunications Regulatory Commission of Sri Lanka for illegal operation, including on two frequencies. While it had obtained provincial approval for the operation, the TRC had not approved on the federal level.

TNL TV is available via satellite on Dialog TV (channel 11) And Lanka Broadband Network, Cable TV, (channel 13), IPTV, And YuppTV After its rebranding as TNL Supreme, the channel is available in the frequencies of VHF 11 (217.25 MHz) - Piliyandala, UHF 21 (471.25 MHz) - Colombo, VHF 04 (62.25 MHz) - Kandy Light, UHF 26 (511.25 MHz) - Gongala, UHF 26 (511.25 MHz) - Kandy, VHF 11 (217.25 MHz) - Kargahathanna, UHF 21 (471.25 MHz)- Badulla, UHF 26 (511.25 MHz) - Ratnapura and UHF 26 (511.25 MHz) - Avissawella.

== Cricket broadcasting ==
The first hosted broadcast was for the 2016 Asia Cup tournament from 24 February 2016 to 6 March 2016.
