= ETV (Sri Lanka) =

- Country: Sri Lanka
- Broadcast area: Sri Lanka

Programming
- Language: English

Ownership
- Owner: Lyca Group
- Sister channels: Swarnavahini

History
- Former names: ETV 2

Availability

Terrestrial
- UHF (Colombo): Channel 35
- UHF (Kalutara): Channel 40

ETV (Extra Terrestrial Vision) is an English language television channel in Sri Lanka owned by EAP Broadcasting Company, a subsidiary of EAP Holdings. Launched in 1995 as ETV 2, it was a sister channel of ETV 1. The channel's owner Extra Terrestrial Vision (Private) Limited, who had been incorporated on 6 July 1992, changed its name to EAP Network (Private) Limited on 30 April 1996 following the acquisition by EAP. At that time ETV 2 was re-broadcasting Star TV. ETV 1 was re-launched as Swarnavahini, a mass market Sinhala language channel, on 16 March 1997. ETV 2 was re-launched as ETV on 1 May 1998. EAP Network (Private) Limited changed its name to EAP Broadcasting Company (Private) Limited on 16 May 2012, EAP Network (Private) Limited on 31 October 2012, EAP Network Limited on 28 August 2013 and EAP Broadcasting Company Limited on 11 September 2013. In 2019, EAP Broadcasting Company parent company EAP Holdings was acquired by Lyca Group. EAP Broadcasting Company is a subsidiary of Ben Holdings along with Lyca Productions.

ETV is available on free-to-air on analogue terrestrial transmission via UHF channel 35 in the Colombo area and UHF channel 40 in the Kalutara area. It is also available on Lanka Broadband Networks cable TV and PEO TV IPTV (channel 119).

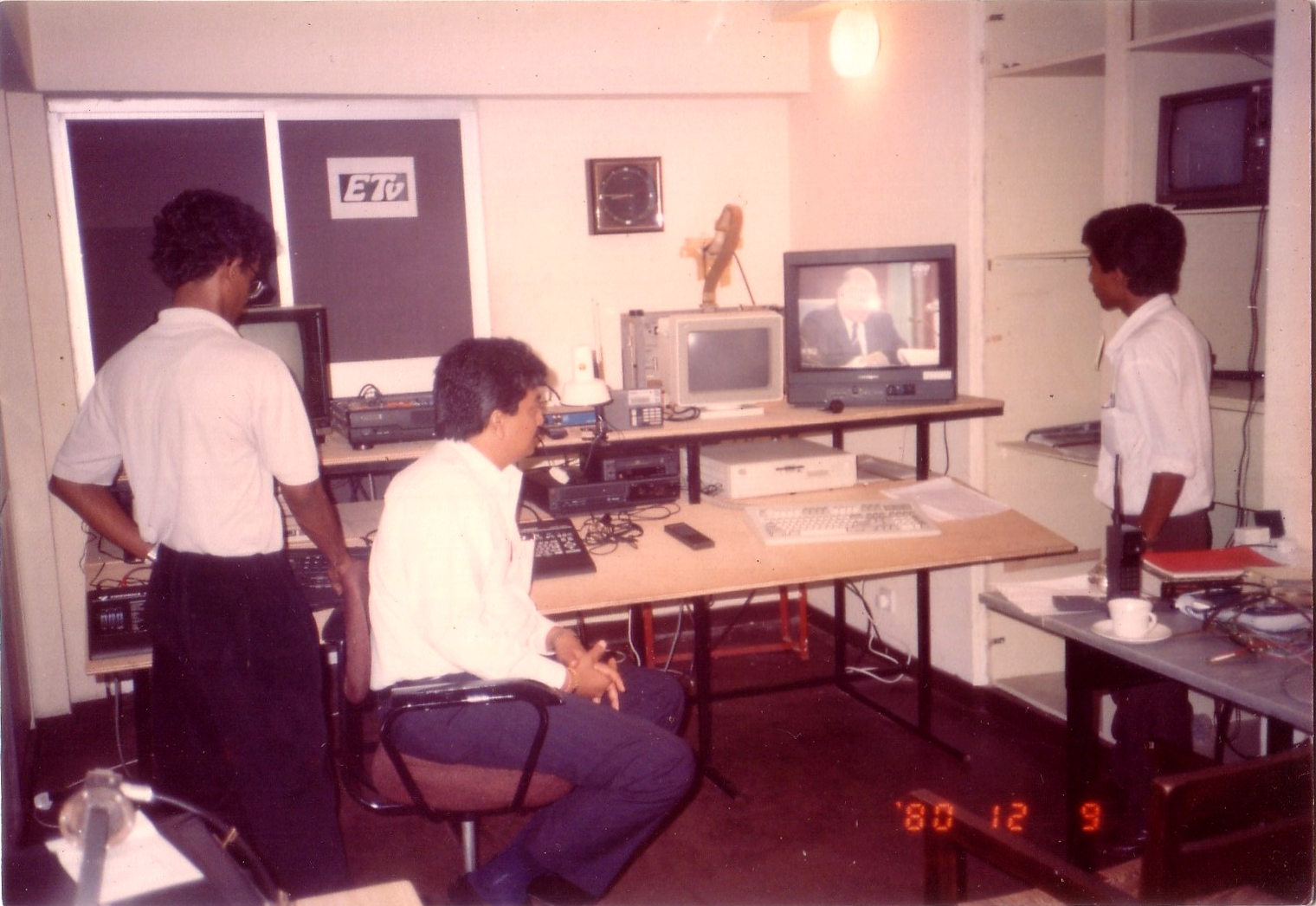
The original ETV (digital) studio: (L to R) Arlaka Jayasekara (Admin Manager MSC/ETV), Sanjay B. (Entrepreneur from India), Priyanke (Anthonus) (CEO/MD MCS & Director/Technology consultant ETV) on the 17th floor of the SET building in Colombo 4, Sri Lanka. Incidentally, the TV shows (BBC NEWS item) an image of Soviet leader Mikhail Gorbachev which caught the attention of Sanjay B.

== History ==
ETV started in late 1991 as a branch of Mirco-Wave Communication Systems (Private) Limited (MCS) (Sri Lanka Registrar of Companies # NPVS9093). MCS was a subsidiary of East-West Enterprises and was the primary reason for the E in ETV (East West Television). The original board of MCS and Later ETV consisted of 4 persons - namely, Nahil Wijesuriya, Captain Lester Weinman, Uoosoof Mohideen and Priyanke de Silva. These four names are in the registrar of companies register for both ETV and Micro-Wave communication systems.

Incidentally, Nahil's alma-mater is Trinity College, Kandy while the other three studied at St. Peter's College, Colombo 4.

The logo of ETV depicted in this article (and has the colours of East West Enterprises) was designed by Nahil Wijesuriya in his office at the Robert Senanayake Building in Nawam Mawatha, Colombo 2.

Priyanke (Anthonus) de Silva (Priyanke Research) met Uoosoof Mohideen at the Arthur C. Clarke Institute for Modern Technologies in August 1990. Priyanke and Uoosoof became friends and it was Uoosoof who invited Priyanke to join MCS as a Consultant Engineer for ETV, which was headed at that time by Mr. Roshan Rupesinghe. Soon after joining, Roshan Rupesinghe migrated to Australia at which point Nahil invited Priyanke to be the CEO/Managing Director of MCS.

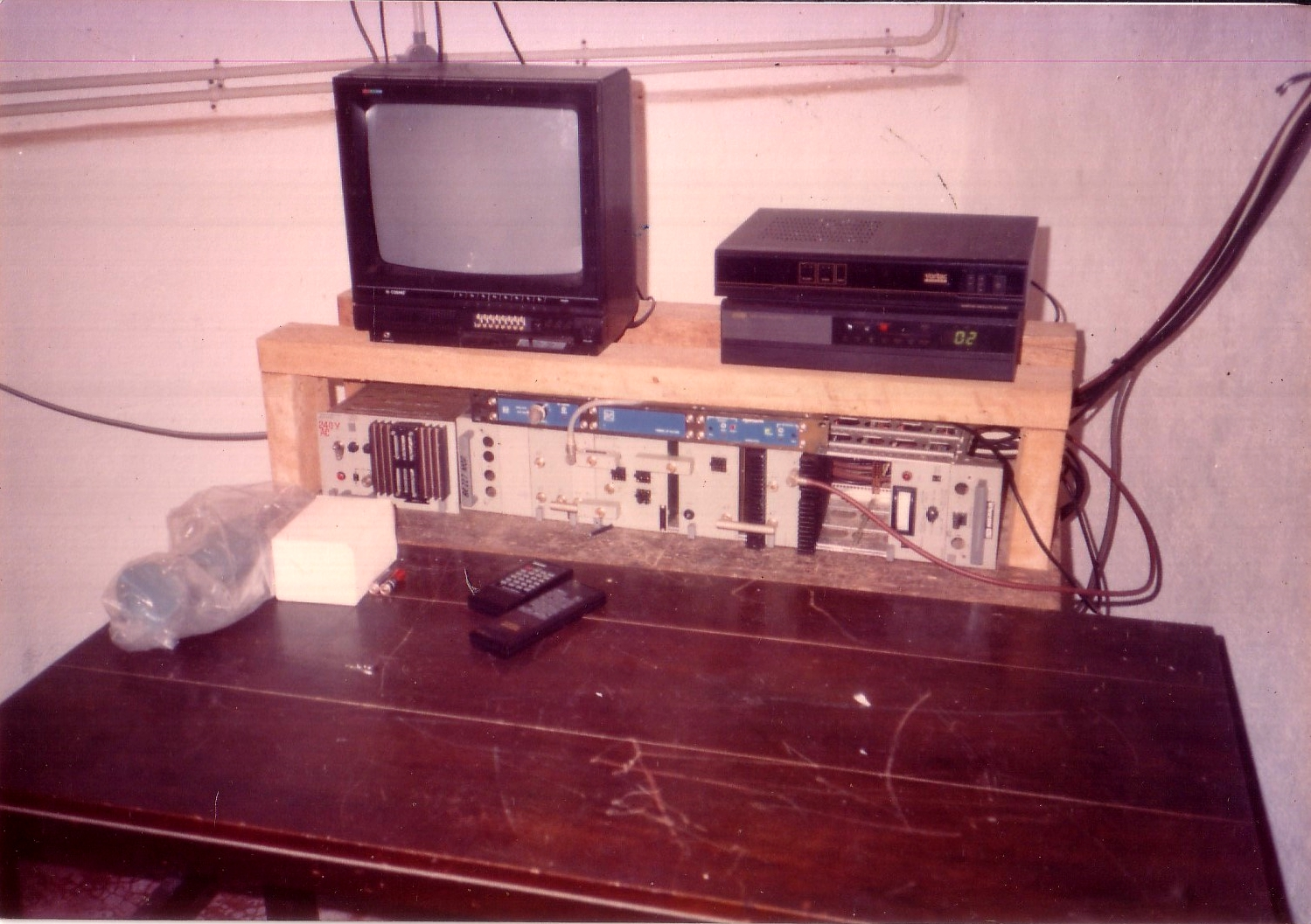
ETV microwave transmitter at 'East-West Properties' at Peliyagoda, Sri Lanka in (under) the 50 ft (15 m) concrete dish. The transmitter was broken into two parts with the head-end on the transmitting tower (antenna) on Priyanke's advice.

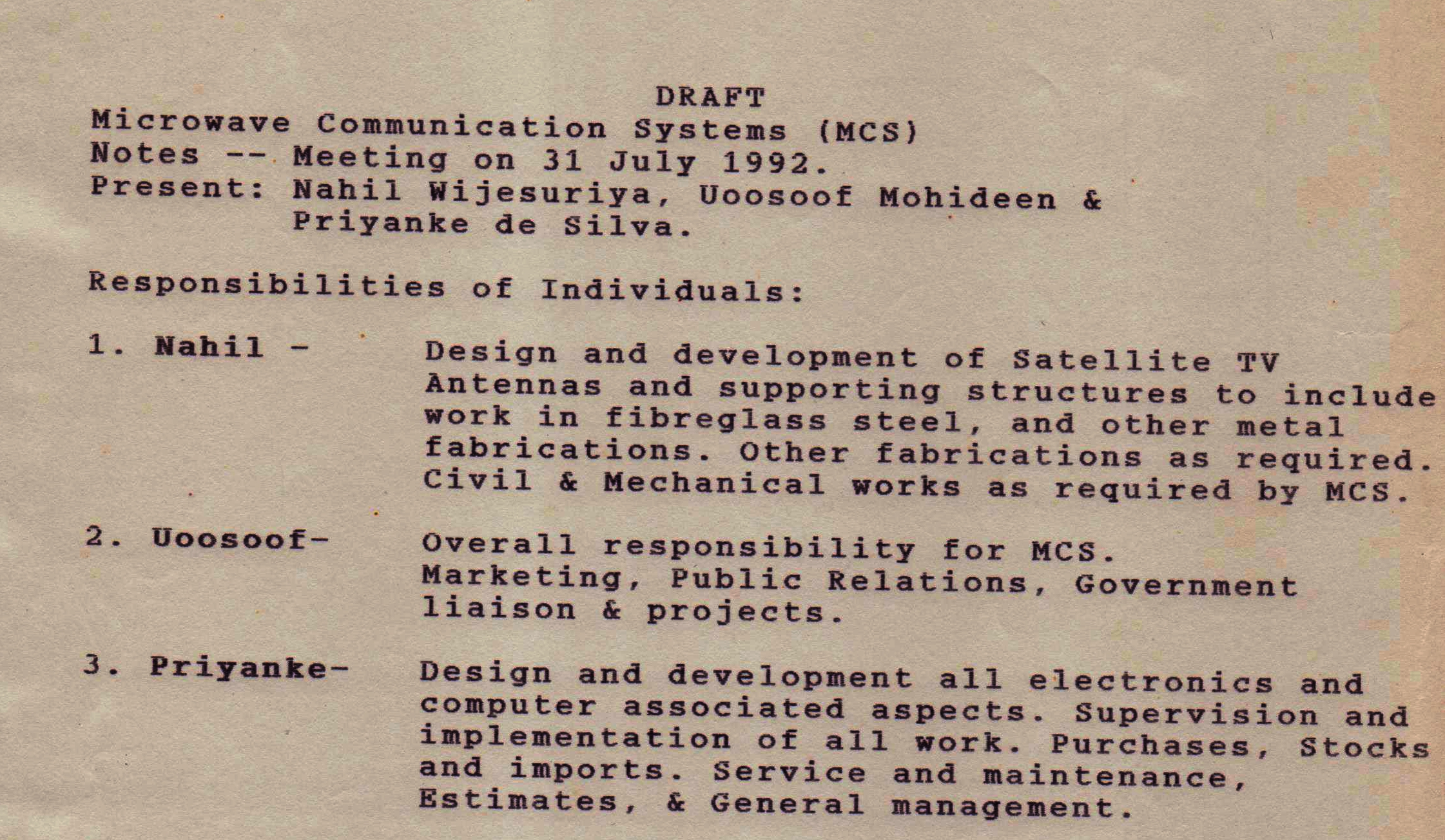
Draft minutes of a board meeting held with 3 (Nahil, Uoosoof and Priyanke) of the 4 members present at Robert Senanayake Building, Nawam Mw., Colombo 2.

Programming for ETV was by down linking AsiaSat1 programs by a 50-foot (15 m) diameter concrete dish built by Nahil (for which he owned a patent) at an east–west property in Peliyagoda, Sri Lanka. The AsiaSat1 signal was very weak (approx -19db to -23db) and the 50-foot (15 m) dish enabled ETV to provide 'broadcast quality' programs. Incidentally, MCS sold self-manufactured glass-fibre dishes of 16-foot (4.9 m) diameter for residential use (including hotels).

Service of the two stations extended to Kandy in 1994.

A microwave, line-of-sight, link from Peliyagoda to Station Rd, Colombo 4 (SET building) fed the content to the broadcasting studio/station on the 17th floor of the SET building.

During this period East-West Enterprises split into two entities and Captain Lester Weinman and Mr. Nahil Wijesuriya went separate ways with Lester getting control of the Robert Senanayake Building and Nahil getting the IBM Building (Thaakshana Mandiraya) in Navam Mawatha, Colombo 2 and Nahil got total control of MCS and ETV. Nahil moved his office to the Thaakshana Mandiraya (IBM building).

Uoosoof Mohideen is/was the CNN representative for Sri Lanka and later joined Dynavision Broadcasting Corporation re-branded as ART TV as CEO upon exiting from MCS/ETV. Incidentally, Priyanke did some ground work for CNN during this time on measuring the CNN signal quality, etc.

Priyanke also exited ETV and MCS, before Uoosoof's exit and the primary reason was that he wanted to go back to concentrating on his core business and other ventures, including as a technology consultant for another east–west (Nahil) owned enterprise.

Nahil continued on with ETV and later sold ETV to EAP Holdings. The network was repositioned at the end of 1996 with the slogan Turn it On, as well as an agreement with NBC and CNBC to provide programming. The new phase brought forth series such as Saved by the Bell, Married... with Children, Mad About You’', The Young and the Restless’', Flipper, The Monroes, Midnight Caller, The Cape, Models Inc., Party of Five, Discovery Channel documentaries, children's series, feature films and the rights to carry the 1996 Cricket World Cup and the Wimbledon tournament from 1997 to 2000. NBC and CNBC provided news and business programming.

Dialog TV added the channel in October 2010, enabling the channel to have total national coverage, while PEO TV added the channel in August 2011.
