= Haritha TV =

Sri Lankan television channel

- Country: Sri Lanka
- Broadcast area: Sri Lanka
- Affiliates: Gangaramaya Temple
- Headquarters: Colombo

Programming
- Language: Sinhala
- Picture format: 480i SDTV on Dialog TV, PEO TV 1080i HDTV on PEO TV CH no:9 4K UHD on online streaming

Ownership
- Owner: Sri Jinarathana Educational Institute of the Hunupitiya Gangaramaya Temple - Advisor Dr Kirinde Assaji & CEO Mahesh Bandara

History
- Launched: 31 March 2021

Links
- Website: harithanetwork.com

Haritha TV is a Sri Lankan 4K Ultra HD entertainment channel currently broadcasting in Sri Lanka in the Sinhala language. The channel airs content mainly focusing about agriculture and also broadcast programmes based on folk arts, nature, heritage and local culture. It is also regarded as Sri Lanka's first exclusive television channel to have been launched with the intention of promoting sustainable agriculture.

== Background ==
Haritha TV was launched by the Sri Jinarathana Educational Institute of the Hunupitiya Gangaramaya Temple on 31 March 2021 under the patronage of Sri Lankan President Gotabaya Rajapaksa.

The channel was created by the Sri Jinarathana Board of Education Regulation Sabha which is affiliated with the Gangaramaya Temple.
