= Channel Eye =

Sri Lankan television channel

- Country: Sri Lanka
- Broadcast area: Sri Lanka
- Network: Sri Lanka Rupavahini Corporation
- Headquarters: Independence Square, Baudhaloka Road, Colombo 7

Programming
- Language: English/Sinhala
- Picture format: 576i 4:3 (SDTV)

Ownership
- Owner: Government of Sri Lanka

History
- Launched: April 1999; 27 years ago
- Former names: Rupavahini 2 (1999–2000)

Links
- Website: www.channeleye.lk

Availability

Terrestrial
- UHF (Rajagiriya): Channel 57
- UHF (Badulla): Channel 57
- UHF (Hanthana): Channel 30
- VHF: Channel 08
- VHF (Colombo): Channel 07

Streaming media
- http://www.channeleye.lk/eye-live.html

Channel Eye is a Sri Lankan youth and sports channel operated by the Sri Lanka Rupavahini Corporation.

== History ==
The channel began broadcasting in April 1999 as Rupavahini 2. In August 2000, it became Channel Eye, with Eye coming from the three pillars of the channel: Education, Youth, and Entertainment. The founder of Channel Eye is Piyadasa Ratnasinghe. In December 2002, the channel started airing Bonsoir, which was produced by France's Ministry of Foreign Affairs. The programme was previously shown on ITN. The programme switched to digital equipment in 2004 in the wake of a joint Rupavahini-CFI agreement.

The channel airs original productions and sporting events. In its first years, it telecasted documentaries from Discovery Channel. In 2006, the channel prioritised sports events but also aired feature films, Tamil miniplays and other programmes to attract English and Tamil viewers. Until 2008, Tamil programming aired under the Channel Eye brand, which eventually gave way to Nethra TV. The new arrangement started on 5 January 2008, which meant that, outside of certain occasions where live sporting events were to be carried, Channel Eye was now broadcasting from 9pm to the frequency's end of transmission.

In 2010 channel Eye relaunched with a new vision to focus on Sport and English language programs. After this relaunch, Channel Eye started to focus on the English audience with in-house productions. For that, director Sunanda Hettiarachchi gave guidance to new and young producers for productions. Channel Eye started with producers Sanjeewa Batuwaththa, Dulanka Tennakoon, Achala Solomons, Subashana Gamage, and Dilani Ayesha.

"Rise and Shine" was the live morning show as the first indoor production for the local English audience. After that Dulanka Tennakoon started the first live Sri Lankan television music show for the local English audience, it named "Sunday Spice". Channel Eye got many successful feedbacks from this program leading Channel Eye to start "Cafe Classic" and "Eye Shuffle" withSubhashana Gamage being the Producer for both programmes.

Niroshi Abeysinghe, Arush Balalla, Thushan Jayasuriya and Dulanjali Ananda joined the mission by starting "Business Today" ,"Law & Order", "Eye Med" and "Path to Freedom".

In 2023, Channel Eye was operating at a loss. The SLRC decided to lease airtime to Lyca Group on 30 June 2023 for the sum of Rs 250 million, using Lyca's subsidiary VIS Broadcasting. The primary goal of the lease was to carry cricket telecasts, other sporting events and entertainment content. The deal was rejected in August by the Cabinet. Both parties were expecting a consensus on the subject by the end of July.

== Programming ==
=== News and current affairs ===
- Rupavahini News (English edition)
- Crosscurrent
- Press review (English and Tamil)

=== Entertainment ===
- Rise and Shine

=== Music ===
- Café Classics
- Battle of the Bands Sri Lanka
- Eye Shuffle

=== Documentaries ===
The channel airs documentaries from various sources, usually from the BBC or the Discovery Channel or from Canal France Internationale, of which the SLRC is a member.

=== Sports ===
Channel Eye telecasts sport international and local programs, mainly for cricket and motor car racing. The channel was the official broadcaster of Cricket World Cup tournaments in [ 1999, 2003, 2007, 2011 and 2015. Channel also broadcast 2007, 2009, 2010 ICC World Twenty20 tournaments.

They also broadcast all Rugby World Cup tournaments. It was the official broadcast of FIFA World Cup in 2010, 2014 and 2018 for Sri Lanka.

Channel Eye is the official broadcaster of Sri Lanka T20 Provincial League.
