= Hanthana Mountain Range =

Mountain range in Sri Lanka

Hanthana conservation forest
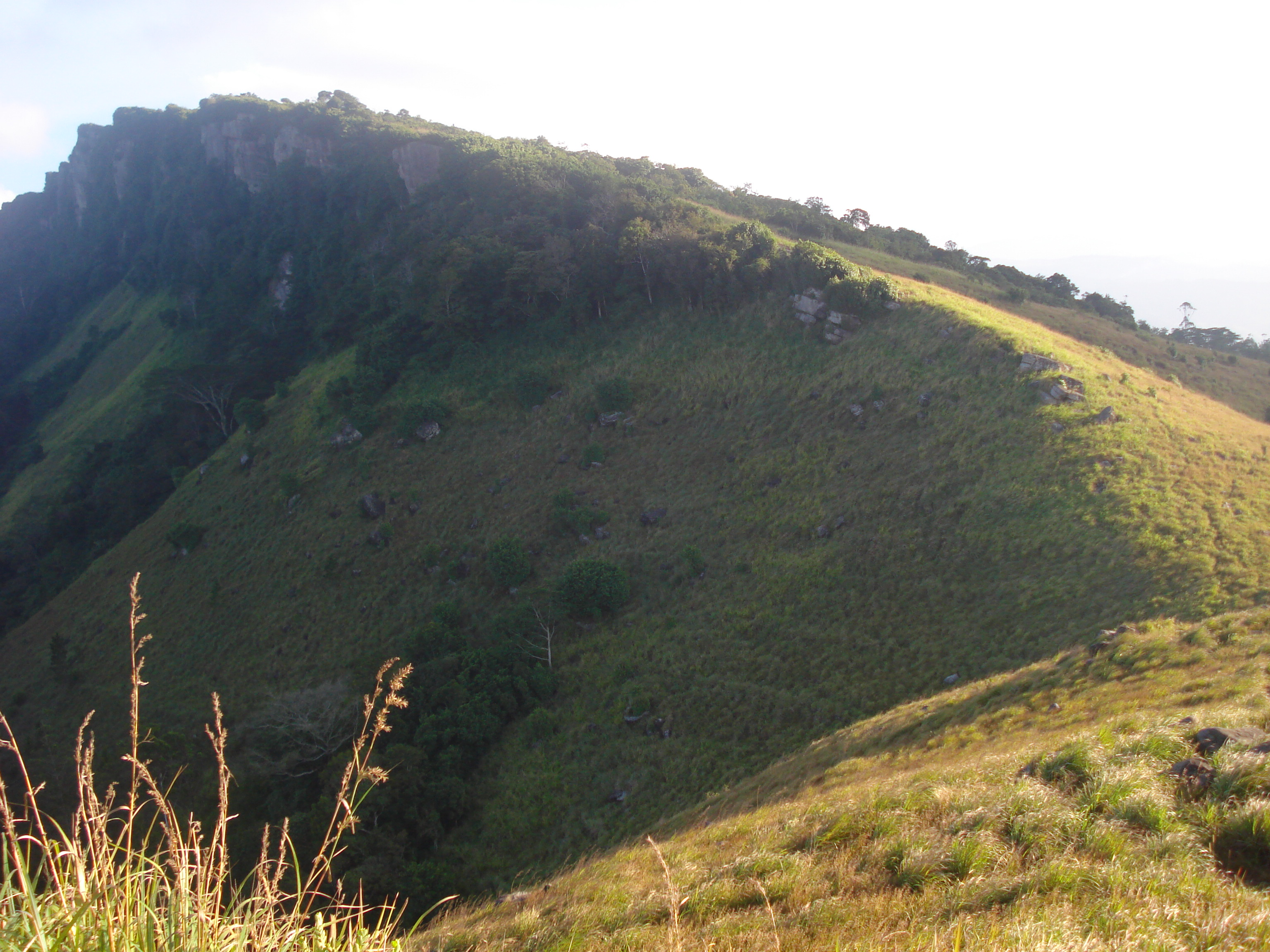

- Location within Sri Lanka
- Location: Central Province, Sri Lanka
- Nearest city: Kandy
- Coordinates: 7°15′31″N 80°37′43″E
- Established: 2010
- Governing body: Department of Forest Conservation

The Hanthana Mountain Range lies in the central highlands of Sri Lanka, south-west of Kandy. It was declared as an environmental protection area in February 2010 under the National Environment Act. The maximum height of the range is 1,200 m (3,800 ft). The mountain range consists of seven peaks. The highest one being the Uura Kanda. The range is a favourite destination among the mountain hikers in Sri Lanka. University of Peradeniya is situated adjacent to the Hanthana mountain range.

== Gallery ==
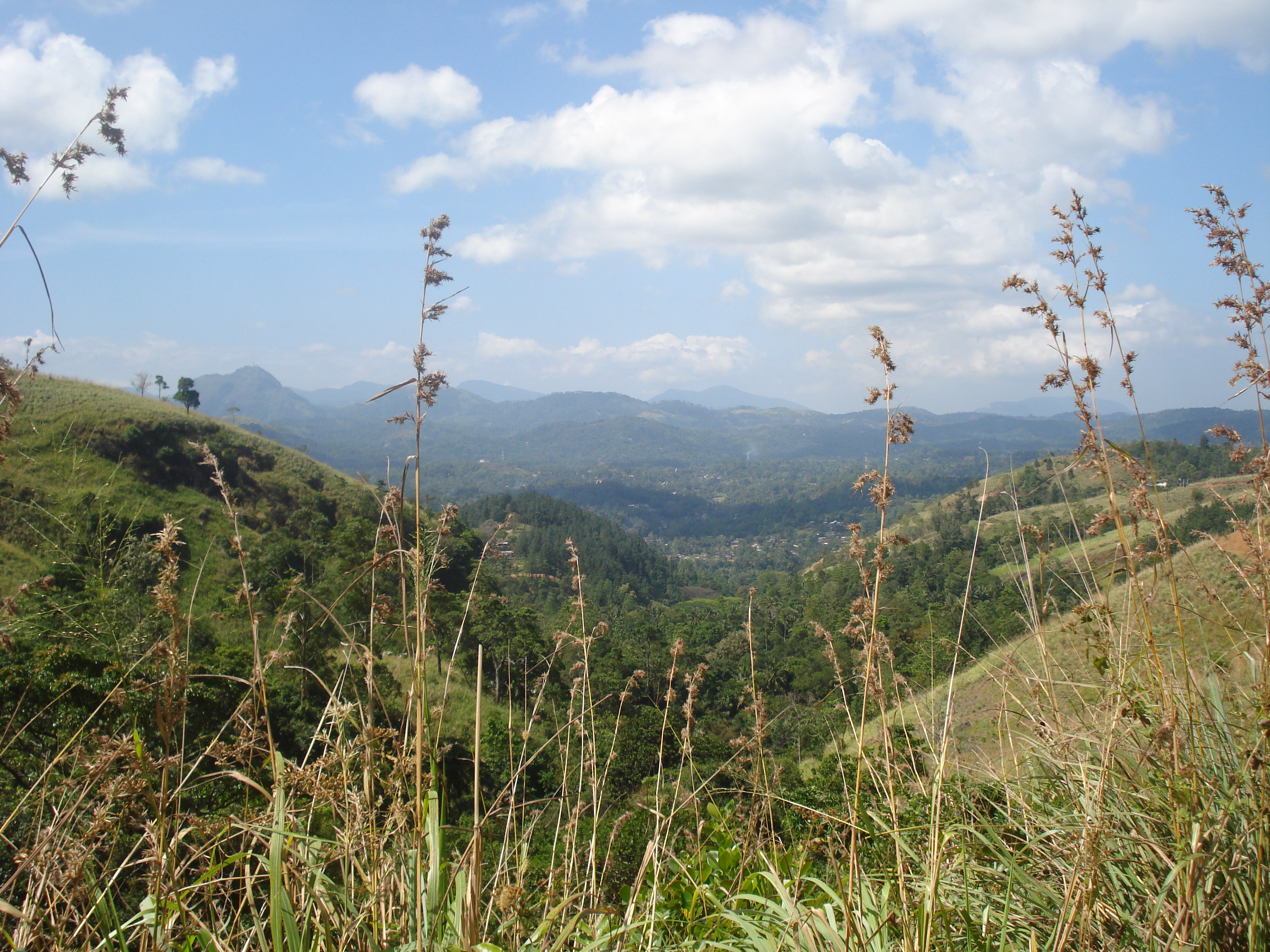
A view from Hanthana

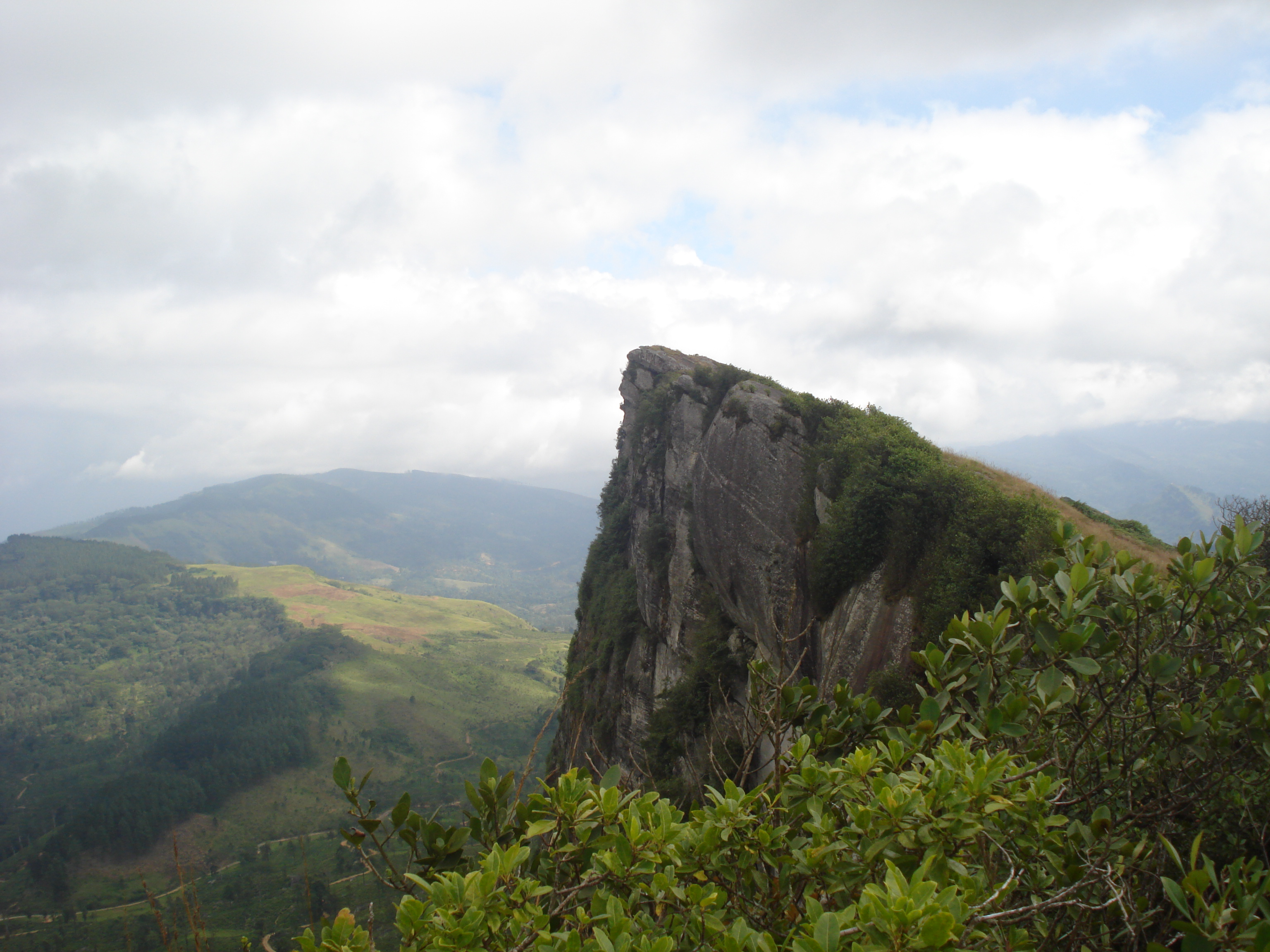
Uura kanda - the highest peak in the Hanthana range

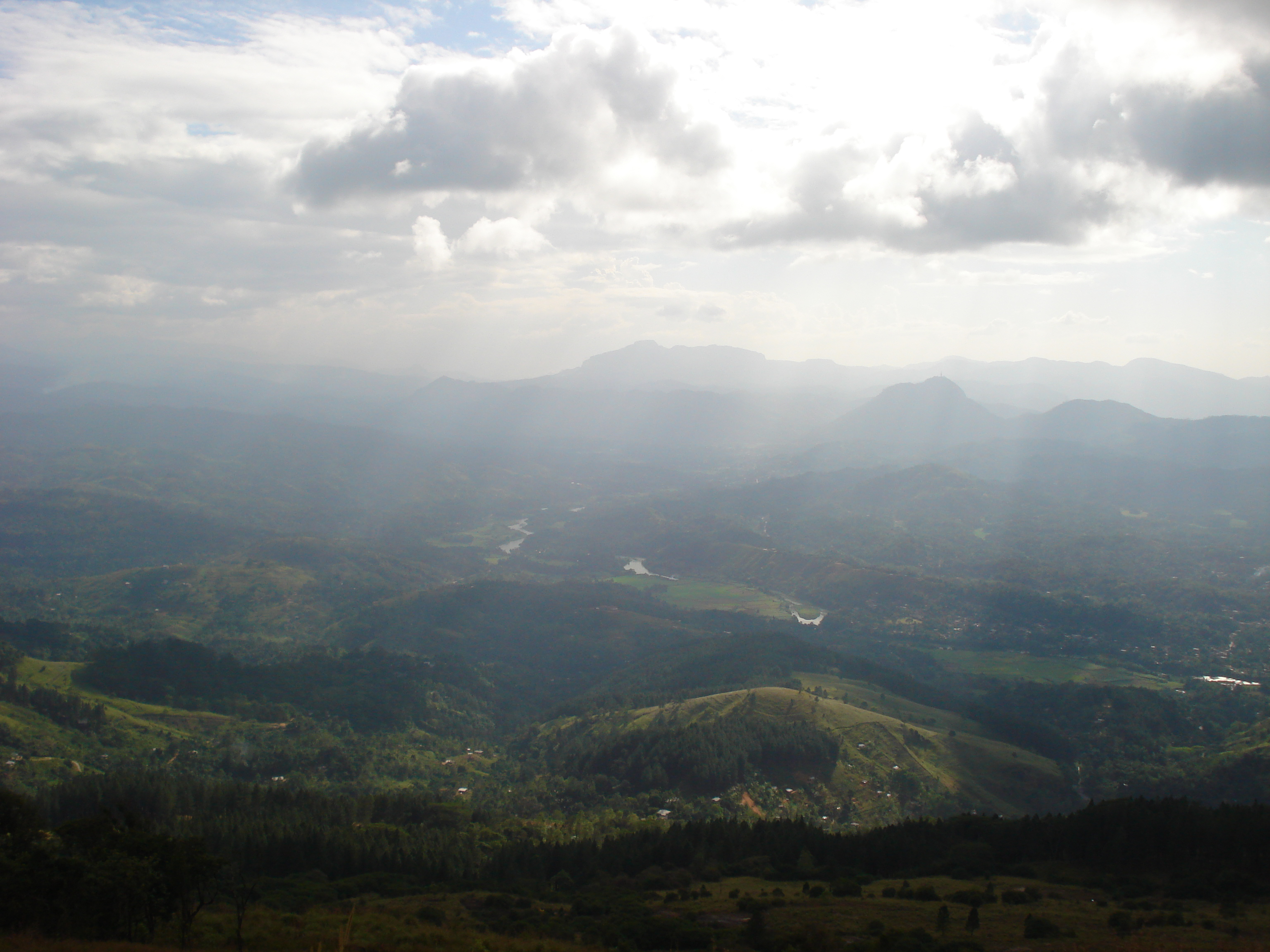
A view from Hanthana communication towers

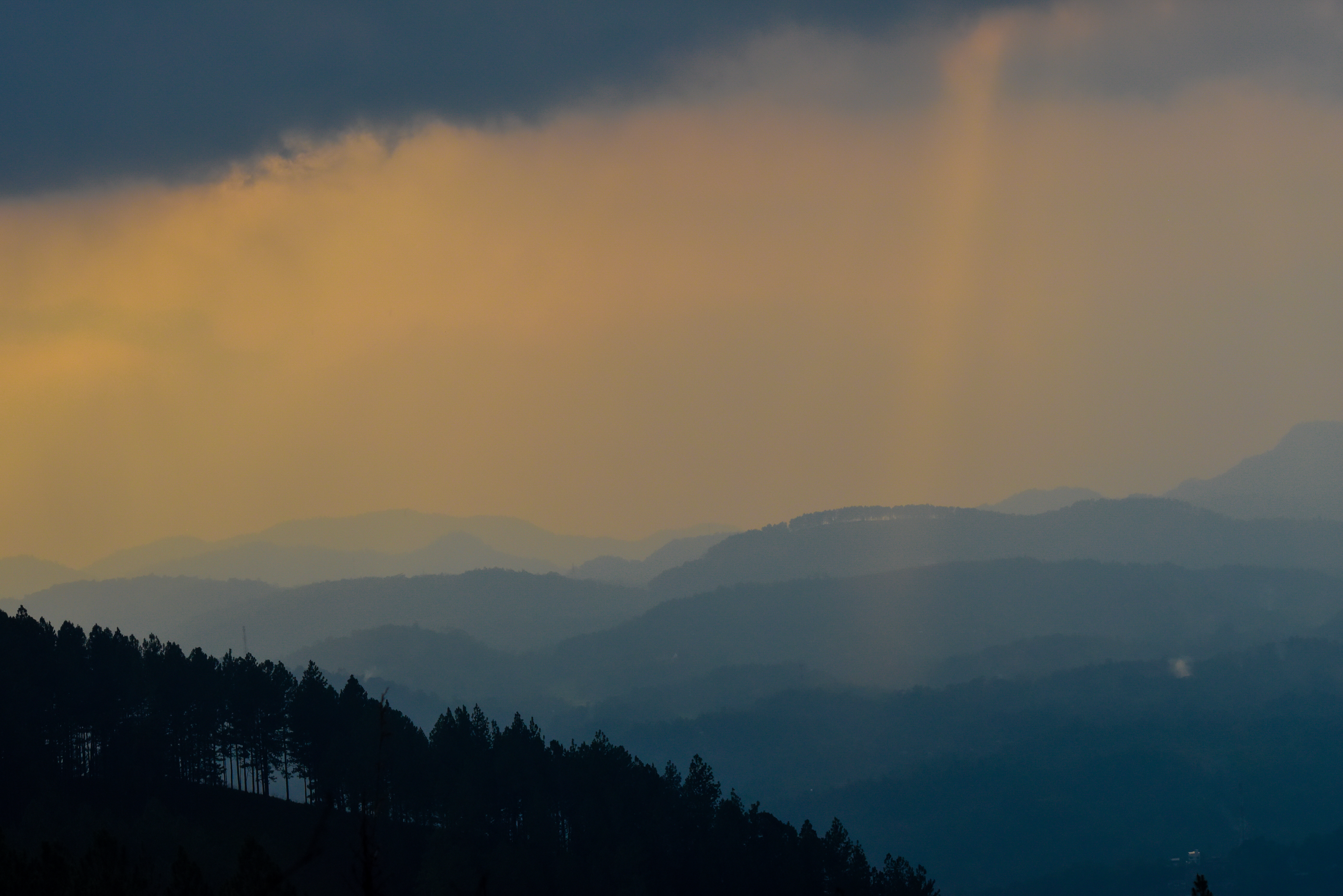
A scenic evening view from the Hanthana Mountain
