= Dialog TV =

Sri Lankan satellite TV service

Dialog Television (Pvt.) Ltd.
- Native name: ඩයලොග් ටීවී (Sinhala), டயலொக் தொலைக்காட்சி (Tamil)
- Type: Subsidiary
- Industry: Pay TV
- Founded: Colombo, Sri Lanka (2005; 21 years ago as CBNsat)
- Headquarters: Union Place, Colombo 02, Sri Lanka
- Area served: Sri Lanka
- Key people: Supun Weerasinghe (Group CEO)
- Products: Direct broadcast satellite
- Operating income: ▲LKR 12.45 Billion
- Net income: ▼LKR 0.98 Billion
- Parent: Dialog Axiata PLC
- Subsidiaries: Communiq Broadband Network (Private) Limited

Dialog TV (DTV) is a direct broadcast satellite pay TV service provider based in Sri Lanka. A fully owned subsidiary of Dialog Axiata PLC, Dialog TV was launched in July 2005 under the name "CBNsat". It was later renamed to Dialog TV in February 2007 after the company was acquired by Dialog Axiata PLC.

Dialog TV currently has over 1.7 million users. Its main competitors in the pay TV market in Sri Lanka are Lanka Broadband Networks (LBN) which provides cable television services in analog and DVB-C in selected areas in Sri Lanka and PEO TV, which is an IPTV platform operated by Sri Lanka Telecom PLC.

Dialog TV has coverage over the entirety of Sri Lanka through the Intelsat 38 satellite.

== Services ==
Dialog TV is a provider of Standard Definition TV (SDTV), High Definition TV (HDTV) and Personal Video Recording (PVR) services in Sri Lanka. Dialog Television currently offers 140 TV channels, including 11 HD channels(1 test HD channel).

Dialog TV offers 2 payment options for customers to receive their service. "Prepaid monthly Packages" allows the customer to pay a monthly rental fee ranging from Rs.325 to Rs.525 for a limited number of channels. Alternatively, the Postpaid payment method has 5 package options with a monthly rental fee of between Rs.699 to Rs.1949 for a higher number of channels.

== Development and expansion ==
Dialog TV signed an agreement with ESPN and Star Sports on 7 March 2006 and launched the channels on 24 March 2006. The Zee package (Zee TV, Zee Café, Zee Cinema, Zee Trendz, Zee Sports, Zee Muzic, Zee Studio) was launched in January. Al Jazeera English was launched on 19 April 2007, replacing the SET channel.

In March 2007, Dialog TV won exclusive rights to broadcast the Cricket World Cup 2007 in Sri Lanka.

Dialog TV's third transponder was launched in late April 2007. The third transponder is now available on Dialog TV for all subscribers and all except one of the new channels are launched. The STAR package was launched on August 3, 2007. STAR Cricket was added on August 7, 2007. In 2007, Sri Lanka's first uninterrupted 24-hour Sinhala movie channel, 'City Hitz was established. In 2008, Dialog TV launched ‘Channel C’, the first-ever 24-hour local music channel.

A software upgrade was tested on 8 June, although it only updated to the June 1, 2006 software, which is included on all decoders sold from January 2007. The 2007 July update was made available on July 18, 2007. This update changed all logos and names on the software to "Dialog TV" from the previous "CBNsat". The software was automatically installed to decoders at 3.00 pm on July 18, 2007, and at 6.00 pm and 9.00 pm on the same day for those who missed the previous updates. If all automatic updates were missed, it is possible to update the software using the IRD Upgrade menu option on the decoder.

By mid-2012, Dialog TV had introduced South India's pioneering Tamil channels, namely Sun TV, KTV and Sun Music.

By 18 February 2015, Dialog TV had decided to upgrade its MPEG-4 service by increasing its channel rate from 94 to 120.

By 18 May 2015, Dialog TV had reached over 500,000 active subscribers. For that reason, Dialog TV gave 30 days free subscription to all channels to all Dialog TV subscribers.

By 6 April Dialog TV added new Test Channels increasing the channel rate to 144.

In 2018 Dialog introduced IPTV+ DTH service with a new enhanced Viu hub set top box. With this new IPTV service, users got access to VOD services and catch-up, and rewind feature.

Then in 2020, They introduced the newly enhanced Viu hub 2.0 which is an Android TV box with dialog exclusive video library, SVOD and DTH+ IPTV live services.

During late 2024, Dialog TV launched Sri Lanka's first sports only Channel in Sri Lanka which is ThePapare TV. Currently 3 main satellite channels under ThePapare TV on Dialog TV under channel numbers 62, 63 on SD & 126 on HD with 2 more IP channels on 127 and 128.

In November 2025, Dialog TV secured the exclusive media rights to broadcast ICC Events in Sri Lanka through January 2028, further strengthening the ICC’s partnership with one of the country’s leading entertainment platforms

== Criticism and controversy ==
=== CBNsat and NTT ===
On June 6, 2006, the Sri Lanka Police's Criminal Investigation Department raided the CBNsat broadcast premises and ordered to shut down the service. CBNsat was accused of not possessing the correct DTH broadcasting license and broadcasting the NTT channel (of the LTTE) on their service. CBNsat was also blamed for broadcasting possibly illegal adult content on Fashion TV.

The Media Ministry took over the case when the CID dropped their charges in late 2006. It was not possible to show evidence of CBNsat broadcasting the NTT channel as it blocked Free To Air channels from the customer decoders and NTT was a Free To Air channel.

The Media Ministry could not prove any of the allegations and was finally forced to provide the necessary license to CBNsat. Meanwhile, CBNsat was financially crippled and was acquired by Dialog Telekom in December 2006 for a value of Rs. 523.8 million. The service was finally relaunched in February 2007.

As a result of the closure, a few subscribers gathered together to form CBNsat Subscribers Unite. The subscribers worked hard to bring CBNsat out of trouble during the closure and ultimately caused the government to give up their vested interests.

=== Presidential Election 2015 ===
On November 22, 2014, A domestic Sri Lanka TV channel Sirasa TV, a part of Capital Maharaja Conglomerate, hosted what experts called a critical political discussion show called "Satana" (weeks before the 2015 Presidential Election). It was reported by a vast number of viewers using Dialog TV and PEO TV to watch Sirasa TV channel and their affiliated sister channels (Shakthi TV and MTV Sports) that their feed got interrupted for the channel during the political show. Many outraged Journalists gave out their opinion on the disruption of information to the public during an important political timeline and that the government is trying to suppress the media. Even though many pointed the finger towards the Sri Lankan President at the time Mahinda Rajapakshe, stating that he is the invisible hand that caused the disruption of the feed, he has categorical refused any direct involvement in the matter.

Neither Dialog TV nor Peo TV has failed to provide a rational explanation for the disruption of feed only for a few channels owned by one media company. The only explanation Dialog TV has expressed was that the disruption was caused by a "technical glitch".

=== Changing Feeds ===
Dialog was criticized for changing the feed of Star Movies to the Indian feed and Cartoon Network Asia to the Pakistani feed. On 4 August 2018, Dialog switched the Indian feeds of Nickelodeon and Nick Jr. to the Asian feeds. like global networks

== See also ==
- Dish TV Sri Lanka
- List of television networks in Sri Lanka
