= Kiss FM (Sri Lanka) =

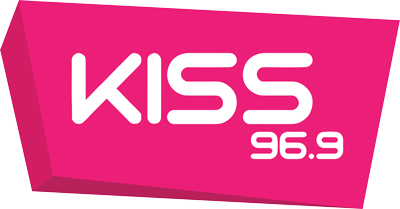
- Sri Lanka
- Frequency: 96.9 MHz

Programming
- Language: English
- Format: Rhythmic CHR

Ownership
- Owner: Voice of Asia Network

History
- First air date: 13 August 2009

Links
- Website: kissfm.lk

Kiss FM is a privately owned English language radio station in Sri Lanka. Founded in 2009 as Kiss 898, the station broadcasts Hip Hop, Pop and Dance music across the country.

== History ==
Kiss 969 started test transmissions in July 2009. The station was officially launched on 13 August 2009. The Top 40 station broadcast a mix of Dance, Hip Hop and Pop to audiences in Colombo, Kandy and the Coastal regions. By 2012 the station had become one of the country's top five media brands.

On 1 November 2012 the station's frequency changed from 89.8 MHz to 96.9 MHz after a nationwide change of all radio frequencies. The station launched its website, official Facebook page and Twitter account on 11 October 2013. Subsequent to that the station launched its official Instagram account on 1 July 2015. Kiss FM was an exclusive broadcaster for the ICC T20 Cricket World Cup 2014.

== Kiss TV ==
Kiss 969 started test transmission of the very first Visual Radio in Asia - KISS TV on the 4 November 2016 with a soft launch bringing a novel concept to the Radio industry in Sri Lanka. Kiss FM also revamped their official website to be the first fully entertainment based English website in Sri Lanka alongside the Kiss TV launch
