= List of social sciences awards =

This list of social sciences awards is an index to articles about notable awards given for contributions to social sciences in general. It excludes LGBTQ-related awards and awards for anthropology, archaeology, economics, geography, history, Information science, politics and political science, psychology and sociology, which are covered by separate lists. The list is organized by the country of the sponsoring organization, but awards may be given to people from other countries.

== Awards ==
Country	Award	Sponsor	Notes
Belgium	Francqui Prize	Francqui Foundation	Scholar or scientist under 50 for exact sciences; social sciences or humanities; or biological or medical sciences
Canada	Innis-Gérin Medal	Royal Society of Canada	Distinguished and sustained contribution to the literature of the social sciences
Canada	Prix Léon-Gérin	Government of Quebec	Researchers in one of the social sciences
Canada	Prix Marie-Andrée-Bertrand	Government of Quebec	Persons whose scope and scientific quality of research led to the development and implementation of social innovations, leading to the well-being of individuals and communities
Chile	National Prize for Humanities and Social Sciences	National Prize of Chile	Humanist, scientist, or academic who has distinguished himself for his contribution in the field of Human Sciences
France	Jean Nicod Prize	French National Centre for Scientific Research	Leading philosopher of mind or philosophically oriented cognitive scientist
Germany	Aby Warburg Prize	City of Hamburg	Excellence in the humanities and social sciences
Germany	Hans-Kilian-Award	Köhler Foundation	Outstanding scientific achievements that provide a deeper insight into the historical and cultural existence of humankind and the changing human psyche
Germany	Herder Prize	Alfred Toepfer Stiftung F.V.S.	Scholars and artists from Central and Southeast Europe whose life and work have contributed to the cultural understanding of European countries and their peaceful interrelations
Germany	Schader Award	Schader foundation	Social scientist
Hungary	John von Neumann Award	Rajk László College for Advanced Studies	Scholar in the exact social sciences, whose works have had substantial influence over a long period of time on the studies and intellectual activity of the students of the college
India	Infosys Prize in Social Sciences	Infosys Science Foundation	Awards outstanding achievements of contemporary researchers and scientists across six categories, including Social Sciences
International	Karl Deutsch Award	International Studies Association	Significant contribution to the study of international relations and peace research by the means of publication
International	Stein Rokkan Prize for Comparative Social Science Research	International Science Council, University of Bergen and European Consortium for Political Research	Substantial and original contribution in comparative social science research
Italy	European Amalfi Prize for Sociology and Social Sciences	Italian Association of Sociology	Book or an article which has made an important contribution to sociology
Japan	International Cosmos Prize	Expo '90 Foundation	Outstanding research work and/or achievement which promotes the philosophy "The Harmonious Coexistence between Nature and Mankind"
Netherlands	Dr Hendrik Muller Prize	Royal Netherlands Academy of Arts and Sciences	Significant or valuable contribution to the behavioural and social sciences
New Zealand	Te Rangi Hiroa Medal	Royal Society Te Apārangi	Work in historical approaches to societal transformation and change; current issues in cultural diversity and cohesion; social and economic policy and development; or medical anthropology
Norway	Holberg Prize	Government of Norway	Outstanding scholars for work in the arts, humanities, social sciences, law and theology, either within one of these fields or through interdisciplinary work
Sweden	Stockholm Prize in Criminology	Stockholm University, Stockholm Prize Foundation	Outstanding achievements in criminological research or for the reduction of crime and the advancement of human rights
Ukraine	Ivan Franko International Prize	Ivan Franko International Foundation	scientific discoveries, significant achievements and considerable efforts of world scientists in the field of Ukrainian Studies and social and humanitarian sciences
United Kingdom	Awards of the British Academy	British Academy	18 awards and medals to recognise achievement in the humanities and social sciences
United Kingdom	British Academy Medal	British Academy	Outstanding achievement that has transformed understanding of a particular subject or field of study in any branch of the humanities and social sciences
United Kingdom	Fellow of the Academy of Social Sciences	Academy of Social Sciences	Leading academics, policy-makers, and practitioners of the social sciences
United Kingdom	Leverhulme Medal	British Academy	Significant contribution to knowledge and understanding in a field within the humanities and social sciences
United Kingdom	President's Medal	British Academy	Outstanding service to the cause of the humanities and social sciences
United States	American Sociological Association Distinguished Scholarly Book Award	American Sociological Association	ASA member's outstanding book
United States	C. Wright Mills Award	Society for the Study of Social Problems	Book that best exemplifies outstanding social science research and a great understanding the individual and society
United States	Charles Tilly Award for Best Book	Collective Behavior and Social Movements Section of the ASA	Significant contribution to the field
United States	Edwin H. Sutherland Award	American Society of Criminology	Distinguished contributions to theory or research in criminology
United States	Jessie Bernard Award	American Sociological Association	Scholarly work that has enlarged the horizons of sociology to encompass fully the role of women in society
United States	John Sessions Memorial Award	American Library Association	Library or library system which has made a significant effort to work with the labor community and by doing so has brought recognition to the history and contribution of the labor movement to the development of the United States
United States	Justin Winsor Prize	American Library Association	Best library history essay
United States	Kluge Prize	John W. Kluge Center and Library of Congress	Lifetime achievement in the humanities and social sciences
United States	Loubat Prize	Columbia University	Best social science works in the English language about North America
United States	Marshall Sklare Award	Association for the Social Scientific Study of Jewry	Significant scholarly contribution to the social scientific study of Jewry
United States	Roger W. Jones Award for Executive Leadership	American University School of Public Affairs	U.S. federal government executive leadership
United States	Rumelhart Prize	Cognitive Science Society	Contributions to the theoretical foundations of human cognition
United States	The Pacific Sociological Association Distinguished Scholarship Award	Pacific Sociological Association	Major scholarly contributions to sociology
United States	Thomas Jefferson Foundation Medal in Global Innovation	Thomas Jefferson Foundation	Innovation
United States	W.E.B. Du Bois Career of Distinguished Scholarship Award	American Sociological Association	Members whose cumulative body of work constitutes a significant contribution to the advancement of sociology
United States	Orlando L. Taylor Award in Africana Communication Research	National Communication Association	Career achievement in Africana communication research
United States	Distinguished Scholar Award	National Communication Association	Distinguished achievement in communication research and teaching
United States	ICA Fellow	International Communication Association	Distinguished achievement in communication research and teaching
United States	William and Katherine Estes Award	National Academy of Sciences	Basic research in any field of cognitive or behavioral science that has employed rigorous formal or empirical methods, optimally a combination of these, to advance our understanding of problems or issues relating to the risk of nuclear war

== See also ==
- Lists of awards
- Lists of science and technology awards
- List of LGBTQ-related awards
- List of anthropology awards
- List of archaeology awards
- List of economics awards
- List of geography awards
- List of history awards
- List of computer science awards#Information science awards
- List of politics awards
- List of psychology awards
- List of sociology awards
