= Neil Brenner =

American urban theorist

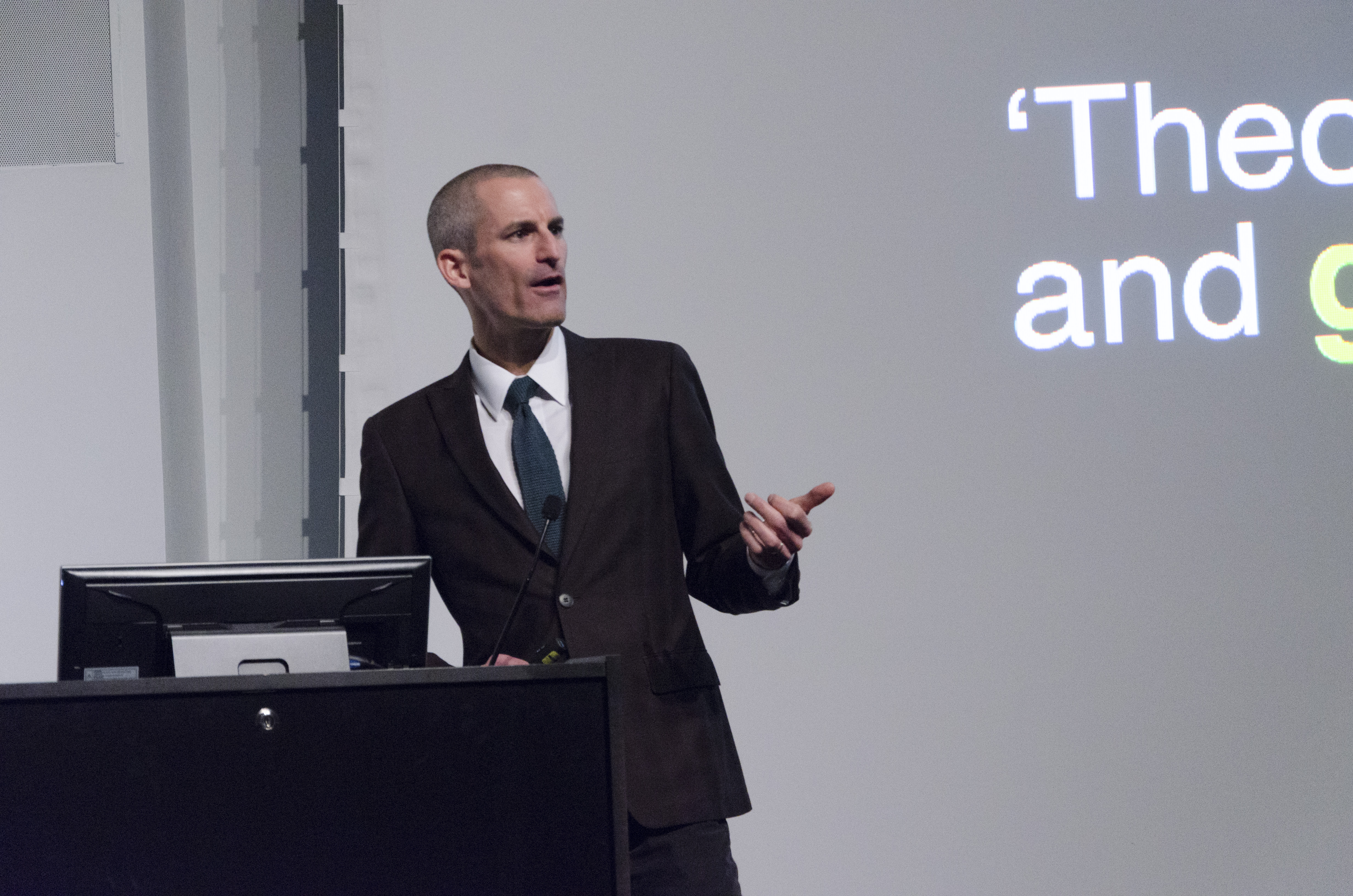
- Brenner lecturing at Columbia GSAPP, 2015
- Born: 1969 (age 56–57)
- Occupations: Sociologist, Urban theorist, Geographer, Critical theorist
- Known for: State spatial restructuring state rescaling neoliberalization critical urban theory planetary urbanization
- Title: Lucy Flower Professor of Urban Sociology at the University of Chicago

Academic background
- Education: Yale University (BA); UCLA (MA); University of Chicago (PhD)
- Thesis: Global Cities, Glocal States: State Re-scaling and the Remaking of Urban Governance in the European Union (1999)
- Doctoral advisor: William H. Sewell Jr.
- Influences: Henri Lefebvre, David Harvey, Edward Soja

Academic work
- Discipline: Urban studies
- School or tradition: Marxist geography; Critical geography
- Institutions: University of Chicago
- Doctoral students: Dorit Geva Brandon Finn Kian Goh David Wachsmuth Hillary Angelo Nikos Katsikis William Conroy Swarnabh Ghosh
- Website: Template:Https://urbantheorylab.net/people/neil-brenner/

Neil Brenner (born 1969) is a sociologist, geographer, and urban theorist based in Chicago. He is the Lucy Flower Professor of Urban Sociology at the University of Chicago and director of the Urban Theory Lab. He previously held professorships at the Harvard Graduate School of Design (2011–2020) and at New York University (1999–2011). At the University of Chicago, he was a founding faculty member of the Committee on Environment, Geography and Urbanization (CEGU) and served as its inaugural Chair (2021–2026)

Brenner’s scholarship is focused on critical urban theory, state spatial restructuring, the political economy of rescaling, neoliberalization, and planetary urbanization. His earlier work examined the transformation of state space, urban governance, and uneven spatial development under capitalism. Subsequent work--including research undertaken in collaboration with Christian Schmid, Nikos Katsikis, Swarnabh Ghosh, and others--has questioned city-centric approaches to urbanization and investigated the relationships between cities and the wider territorial, infrastructural, and ecological processes through which the capitalist form of urbanization unfolds. These arguments have contributed to scholarly debates concerning the conceptualization of urbanization in relation to planetary ecological crises.

Recent collaborative research has examined the relationships between capitalist urbanization, operational landscapes, fossil energy, and planetary socioenvironmental transformations. Brenner's major publications include New State Spaces: Urban Governance and the Rescaling of Statehood (2004), Critique of Urbanization: Selected Essays (2016), and New Urban Spaces: Urban Theory and the Scale Question (2019), as well as collaborative publications on planetary urbanization and its socioenvironmental dimensions. Brenner received a Guggenheim Fellowship in 2026.

== Affiliated institutions ==
Brenner received his BA in philosophy, summa cum laude, from Yale University in 1991, an MA in political science from the University of Chicago in 1994, an MA in geography from the University of California, Los Angeles, in 1996, and a PhD in political science from the University of Chicago in 1999.

He held faculty appointments at New York University from 1999 to 2011 and Harvard University's Graduate School of Design from 2011 to 2020, before joining the University of Chicago in 2020. He directs the Urban Theory Lab and served as inaugural chair of the Committee on Environment, Geography and Urbanization (CEGU) from 2021 to 2026.

== Awards ==
- Riggs Memorial Prize in the Humanities, Yale College (1988).
- Phi Beta Kappa (1991)
- Senior Thesis Prize in Political Theory, Department of Political Science, Yale College (1991)
- Fulbright Scholarship, Division of Philosophy and Social Sciences, Freie Universität, Berlin (1991–1992)
- Bundeskanzler Fellowship/Alexander von Humboldt Stiftung (1997–1998)
- Donald Robertson Memorial Prize, Editorial Board of Urban Studies (1999)
- Young Researcher’s Award, Royal Geographical Society (2000)
- Honorable Mention, Distinguished Publication Award, Political Sociology Section, American Sociological Association (2005).
- Honorable Mention, Outstanding Publication Award, Political Sociology Section, American Sociological Association (2005)
- Honorary Master of Arts, Harvard University Graduate School of Design (2012)
- Academic Committee Award, Bi-City Biennale of Urbanism/Architecture, Shenzhen, China (2016)
- Weatherhead Center Distinguished Research Faculty Associate, Weatherhead Center for International Affairs, Harvard University (2020)
- Thomson Reuters Highly Cited Researcher (2014)
- Guggenheim Fellow in Architecture, Planning and Design (2026)

== Bibliography ==
=== Authored and co-authored books in English ===
- New State Spaces: Urban Governance and the Rescaling of Statehood (2004)
- Critique of Urbanization: Selected Essays (2016)
- New Urban Spaces: Urban Theory and the Scale Question (2019)
- Brenner, Neil, Swarnabh Ghosh, and Nikos Katsikis. Environments of Planetary Urbanization. Berlin: Jovis, 2025.
- Bašić, Grga, Neil Brenner, Mariano Gomez-Luque, and Nikos Katsikis. Data-Spheres of Planetary Urbanization. Berlin: Jovis, 2026.

=== Authored books in other languages ===
- La explosion de lo urbano
- Stato, spazio, urbanizzazione (2017)
- Teoría urbana crítica y políticas de escala (2017)
- Espaços da Urbanização: o urbano a partir da teoria crítica (2018)
- 城市，地域，星球：批判城市理论 / City, Territory, Planet: Studies in Critical Urban Theory (2020)

=== Edited and co-edited books ===
- Implosions/Explosions: Towards a Study of Planetary Urbanization (2014)
- Cities for People, not for Profit: Critical Urban Theory and the Right to the City (2011)
- Henri Lefebvre, State, Space, World (2009)
- The Global Cities Reader (2006)
- State/Space: A Reader (2003)
- Spaces of Neoliberalism: Urban Restructuring in Western Europe and North America (2002)

=== Pamphlets ===
- "The Afterlives of Neoliberalism" (2012)

=== Selected journal articles ===
- Brenner, N. "Globalisation as reterritorialisation: the re-scaling of urban governance in the European Union." Urban Studies 36 (3), pp. 431–451 (1999)
- Brenner, N. "The limits to scale? Methodological reflections on scalar structuration." Progress in Human Geography 25 (4), pp. 591–614 (2001)
- Brenner, N. and Theodore, N. "Cities and the geographies of 'actually existing neoliberalism.'" Antipode 34 (3), pp. 349–379 (2002)
- Brenner, N., Peck, J., and Theodore, N. "Variegated neoliberalization: geographies, modalities, pathways." Global Networks 10 (2), pp. 182–222 (2010)
- Brenner, Neil, and Christian Schmid. "The 'Urban Age' in Question." International Journal of Urban and Regional Research 38, no. 3 (2014): 731–755. DOI: 10.1111/1468-2427.12115.
- Brenner, N. and Schmid, C. "Towards a new epistemology of the urban?" City 19 (2–3), pp. 151–182 (2015)
- Brenner, Neil, and Swarnabh Ghosh. "Between the Colossal and the Catastrophic: Planetary Urbanization and the Political Ecologies of Emergent Infectious Disease." Environment and Planning A: Economy and Space 54, no. 5 (2022): 867–910. DOI: 10.1177/0308518X221084313.
- Brenner, Neil, and Swarnabh Ghosh. "The Monster 'Within': Capitalist Urbanization as Geometabolic Escalation." Development and Change 56, nos. 4–5 (2025): 668–728. DOI: 10.1111/dech.70015.
