= List of sociology awards =

This list of sociology awards is an index to articles about of notable awards given to persons, groups, or institutions for their contributions to the study of sociology.

Name	Sponsor	First awarded
Distinguished Scholarly Book Award (formerly named the MacIver Award)	American Sociological Association	1956
C. Wright Mills Award	Society for the Study of Social Problems	1964
Charles Horton Cooley Award	Society for the Study of Symbolic Interaction	1978
Common Wealth Award of Distinguished Service	PNC Bank	1979
Jessie Bernard Award	American Sociological Association	1979
W.E.B. Du Bois Career of Distinguished Scholarship Award	American Sociological Association	1980
Scholarly Achievement Award	North Central Sociological Association	1981
Stein Rokkan Prize for Comparative Social Science Research	International Social Science Council	1981
Albert J. Reiss, Jr. Award (formerly named the Distinguished Scholar Award)	American Sociological Association Section on Crime, Law, and Deviance	1983
Distinguished Book Award	Society for the Scientific Study of Religion	1984
William J. Goode Award	American Sociological Association Section on Family	1985
Charles Tilly Award for Best Book	American Sociological Association Section on Collective Behavior and Social Movements	1986
Distinguished Scholarship Award	Pacific Sociological Association	1986
Outstanding Scholarship Award	Society for the Study of Social Problems Division on Crime and Juvenile Delinquency	1986
European Amalfi Prize for Sociology and Social Sciences	Italian Association of Sociology	1987
Book Award	Association for Humanist Sociology	1987
Robert Park Award	American Sociological Association Section on Community and Urban Sociology	1987
Outstanding Book Award	American Sociological Association Section on Collective Behavior and Social Movements	1988
Distinguished Scholarship Award	American Sociological Association Section on the Political Economy of the World-System	1989
Best Book Award	American Sociological Association Section on Culture	1990
Book Award	American Sociological Association Section on Political Sociology	1991
Distinguished Book Award	American Sociological Association Section on Marxist Sociology	1991
Michael J. Hindelang Award	American Society of Criminology	1991
Robert K. Merton Award	American Sociological Association Section on Science, Knowledge, and Technology	1991
Distinguished Book Award	American Society of Criminology Division of International Criminology	1992
Max Weber Book Award	American Sociological Association Section on Organization, Occupations, and Work	1992
Otis Dudley Duncan Award	American Sociological Association Section on Population	1992
Book Award	North American Society for the Sociology of Sport	1993
Eliot Freidson Outstanding Publication Award	American Sociological Association Section on Medical Sociology	1993
Distinguished Book Award	American Sociological Association Section on Law	1994
Distinguished Scholar of the Year	American Society of Criminology Division on Women and Crime	1994
Ludwik Fleck Prize	Society for Social Studies of Science	1994
Theory Prize	American Sociological Association Section on Theory	1994
Willard Waller Award	American Sociological Association Section on Education	1994
Oliver Cromwell Cox Award	American Sociological Association Section on Racial and Ethnic Minorities	1996
Thomas & Znaniecki Book Award	American Sociological Association Section on International Migration	1996
Distinguished Book Award	American Sociological Association Section on Religion	1997
Outstanding Book Award	American Sociological Association Section on Asia and Asian America	1997
Distinguished Contribution to Scholarship Award	American Sociological Association Section on Sex and Gender	1998
Distinguished Publication Award	Society for the Study of Social Problems Division on Labor Studies	1998
Rachel Carson Prize	Society for the Social Studies of Science	1998
Distinguished Book Award	American Sociological Association Section on Aging and the Life Course	1999
Outstanding Scholarly Achievement	Rural Sociological Society	1999
Distinguished Contribution to Scholarship Book Award	American Sociological Association Section on Latino/a Sociology	2000
Outstanding Publication	American Sociological Association Section on Environment and Technology	2000
Outstanding Recent Contribution Award	American Sociological Association Section on the Sociology of Emotions	2000
Distinguished Contribution to Scholarship Award	American Sociological Association Section on Race, Gender, and Class	2001
Mirra Komarovsky Book Award	Eastern Sociological Society	2001
Distinguished Scholarly Book Award	American Sociological Association Section on the History of Sociology	2003
Viviana Zelizer Award	American Sociological Association Section on Economic Sociology	2003
Book Award	American Association for Public Opinion Research	2004
Award for Distinguished Scholarship	American Sociological Association Section on Animals and Society	2005
Distinguished Scholarly Book Award	American Sociological Association Section on Labor and Labor Movements	2005
Outstanding Book	American Sociological Association Section on Communication and Information Technologies	2006
James S. Coleman Award	American Sociological Association Section on Rationality and Society	2006

== See also ==
- Lists of awards
- List of social sciences awards
