= List of human rights awards =

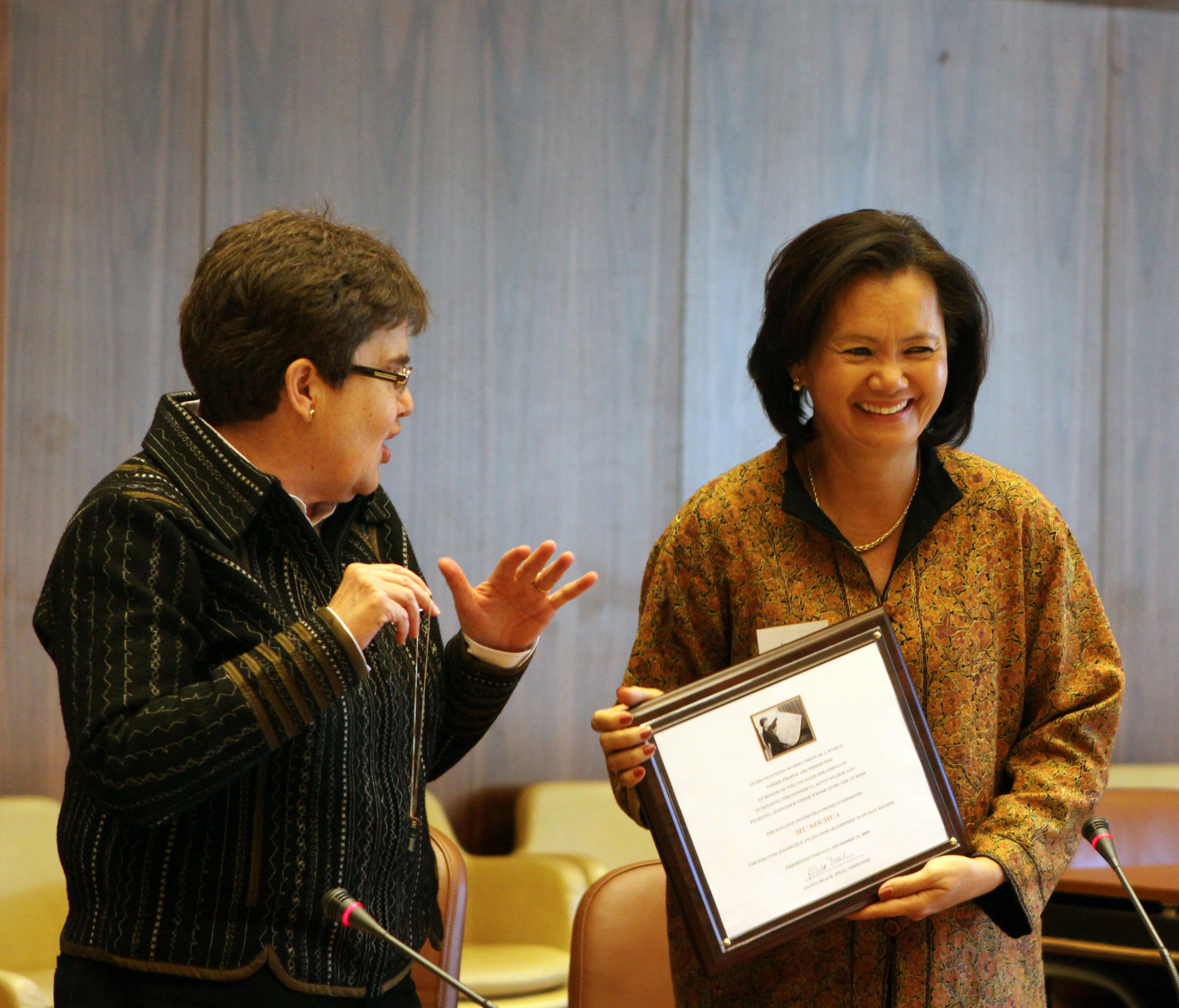
Mu Sochua receives the Eleanor Roosevelt Award for Human Rights in 2009 at The George Washington University.

This list of human rights awards is an index to articles about notable awards given for the promotion of human rights. These are moral principles or social norms that describe certain standards of human behaviour and are regularly protected as natural and legal rights in municipal and international law. The list is organized by region and country of the main sponsoring organizations, but many of the awards are open to people or organizations from other countries and regions.

== International ==
Country	Award	Sponsor	Given for
International	UNESCO/Bilbao Prize for the Promotion of a Culture of Human Rights	UNESCO	Institutions, organizations and individuals that have made a particularly important and effective contribution to the promotion of a culture of human rights at regional and international levels
International	United Nations Prize in the Field of Human Rights	United Nations	Individuals and organizations in recognition of outstanding achievement in human rights

== Africa ==
Country	Award	Sponsor	Notes
Libya	Al-Gaddafi International Prize for Human Rights	General People's Congress (Libya)	International personalities, bodies or organizations that have distinctively contributed to rendering an outstanding human service and has achieved great actions in defending Human rights, protecting the causes of freedom and supporting peace everywhere in the world
South Africa	Vera Chirwa Awards	The Centre for Human Rights, University of Pretoria	Need to demonstrate dedicated human rights activism, leadership in the field of human rights and democratisation affecting Africa and Africans; contribute to a specific human rights cause or causes, and demonstrate commitment to improving the lives of people everywhere in Africa
African sub-regional network	Shield Awards	The Pan-African Human Rights Defenders Network	Honors exceptional individuals who have contributed to changes in their community by peacefully promoting and protecting human rights, as universally recognised by the Universal Declaration of Human Rights and the African Charter on Human and Peoples’ Rights
Ethiopia	Annual Human Rights Defender Award	Ethiopian Human Rights Defenders Center	Recognizes the situations of human rights defenders in Ethiopia and highlight the risks they face in their daily lives as well as, the award enhance the award recipient’s human rights activities. The recipient must follow a peaceful approach and must work from a deep personal interest to help others.

== Americas ==
=== Canada ===
Award	Sponsor	Given for
John Humphrey Freedom Award	International Centre for Human Rights and Democratic Development	Exceptional achievement in the promotion of human rights and democratic development
The Wolf Award	The Wolf Project	Efforts to improve racial tolerance and understanding

=== Mexico ===
Award	Sponsor	Given for
National Human Rights Prize	National Human Rights Commission (CNDH)	The effective promotion and defence of fundamental rights

=== United States ===
Award	Sponsor	Given to/for
Four Freedoms Award	Roosevelt Institute for American Studies	Commitment to the principles which US President Franklin D. Roosevelt proclaimed on January 6, 1941, as essential to democracy: freedom of speech and expression, freedom of worship, freedom from want, freedom from fear
Eleanor Roosevelt Award for Human Rights	President of the United States	American promoters of rights in the United States
AAAS Award for Scientific Freedom and Responsibility	American Association for the Advancement of Science	Exemplary actions, often taken at significant personal cost, that have served to foster scientific freedom and responsibility and increased scientific awareness throughout the world
Ivan Allen Jr. Prize for Social Courage	Wilbur and Hilda Glenn Family Foundation	Individuals who, like Mayor Ivan Allen Jr., stand up for moral principles and render service to humanity without regard for personal or professional peril
Brandeis Medal	University of Louisville	Commitment to the ideals of individual liberty, concern for the disadvantaged and public service
William J. Brennan Award	Thomas Jefferson Center for the Protection of Free Expression	(Various awards)
Carter–Menil Human Rights Prize	Carter-Menil Human Rights Foundation	Individuals and institutions that promote human rights
Civil Courage Prize	The Train Foundation	Draw attention individually to some extraordinary heroes of conscience
Courage Award for the Arts	Yoko Ono	Artists, musicians, collectors, curators, writers who sought the truth in their work and demonstrated leadership, courage, resourcefulness in their work, and risked their careers by pursuing a larger vision of the local or national interest despite pressure to succumb to commercial and political constraints
Thomas J. Dodd Prize in International Justice and Human Rights	University of Connecticut	Significant effort to advance the cause of international justice and global human rights
Free Your Mind	MTV	Sensitize spectators in touchy matters, the social meat and potatoes, human rights violations, of political and civil laws, promoting the environmental protection in the process NGOs as well as individuals which are dealing with the given subject matter
Freedom Award	International Rescue Committee	Extraordinary contributions to the cause of refugees and human freedom
Marcus Garvey Prize for Human Rights	Universal Negro Improvement Association and African Communities League	Distinguished individuals and human right leaders
Global Jurist of the Year Award	Northwestern University Pritzker School of Law	Sitting judge who has contributed to the advancement of international human rights law or international criminal law
Global Leadership Awards	Vital Voices	International women leaders who are working in the fields of human rights, economic empowerment, or political reform
Gruber Prize for Justice	Gruber Foundation	Contributions that have advanced the cause of justice as delivered through the legal system
Gruber Prize for Women's Rights	Gruber Foundation	Significant contributions, often at great personal or professional risk, to furthering the rights of women and girls in any area and to advancing public awareness of the need for gender equality to achieve a just world
Robert F. Kennedy Human Rights Award	Robert F. Kennedy Human Rights	Individuals around the world who show courage and have made a significant contribution to human rights in their country
Letelier-Moffitt Human Rights Award	Institute for Policy Studies	Advancing the cause of human rights in the Americas
Light of Truth Award	International Campaign for Tibet	NGO aiming for the promotion of democracy and human rights for the Tibetan people
George Meany-Lane Kirkland Human Rights Award	AFL–CIO	People and entities that fight for human rights in the field of labor relations
Thomas Merton Award	Thomas Merton Center (Pittsburgh)	National and international individuals struggling for justice
Philadelphia Liberty Medal	National Constitution Center	Leadership in the pursuit of freedom
Reebok Human Rights Award	Reebok	Activists under the age of thirty who fought for human rights through non-violent means
Andrei Sakharov Prize (APS)	American Physical Society	Outstanding leadership and/or achievements of scientists in upholding human rights

== Asia ==
Country	Award	Sponsor	Notes
Indonesia	Yap Thiam Hien Award	Yayasan Pusat Studi Hak Asasi Manusia	Human rights in Indonesia since 1992
Israel	Emil Grunzweig Human Rights Award	Association for Civil Rights in Israel	Advancement of human rights in Israel
Israel	Jerusalem Prize	Jerusalem International Book Forum	Writers who promote freedom of the individual in society
Philippines	Ka Pepe Diokno Human Rights Award	De La Salle University	Persons or groups who exemplified their commitment to the furtherance of human rights, social justice, and Philippine sovereignty.
South Korea	Human Rights Award of Korea	National Human Rights Commission of Korea	Contribution to Korean and international human rights
Taiwan	Asia Democracy and Human Rights Award	Taiwan Foundation for Democracy	Contributions through peaceful means to the development of democracy and human rights in Asia

== Europe ==
Country	Award	Sponsor	Notes
Europe	Raoul Wallenberg Prize	Council of Europe	
Europe	Film Award of the Council of Europe	Council of Europe	
Europe	Václav Havel Human Rights Prize	Parliamentary Assembly of the Council of Europe	
Europe	North–South Prize	North–South Centre	
Europe	Sakharov Prize	European Parliament	
Europe	Robert Schuman Medal, EPP Group	European People's Party group	
Austria	Felix Ermacora Human Rights Award	Felix Ermacora Verein	
Austria	Bruno Kreisky Prize for Services to Human Rights	Bruno Kreisky Foundation	
Belgium	Ark Prize of the Free Word	Nieuw Vlaams Tijdschrift	
Czech Republic	Homo Homini Award	People in Need	
Denmark	The Inge Genefke Award	Anti-Torture Support Foundation	
France	Simone de Beauvoir Prize	Simone de Beauvoir prize committee	
France	Prix Alexis de Tocqueville	Château de Tocqueville	
France	Ludovic Trarieux International Human Rights Prize	Human Rights Institute of The Bar of Bordeaux etc.	
France and Germany	Franco-German Prize for Human Rights and the Rule of Law	French and German governments	
Germany	Hannah Arendt Prize	Heinrich Böll Foundation	
Germany	European Civil Rights Prize of the Sinti and Roma	Central Council of German Sinti and Roma	
Germany	The Friedrich Ebert Foundation Human Rights Prize	Friedrich Ebert Foundation	
Germany	Victor Gollancz Prize	Society for Threatened Peoples	
Germany	Leipzig Human Rights Award	European-American Citizens Committee for Human Rights and Religious Freedom in the USA	
Germany	Nuremberg International Human Rights Award	Nuremberg City Council	
Germany	Hanns Martin Schleyer Prize	Hanns Martin Schleyer Foundation	
Germany	Robert Schuman Prize, Alfred Toepfer Foundation	Alfred Toepfer Stiftung F.V.S.	
Germany	Toleranzpreis der Evangelischen Akademie Tutzing	Evangelische Akademie Tutzing	
Germany	Franz Werfel Human Rights Award	Federation of Expellees	
Ireland	Front Line Defenders Award for Human Rights Defenders at Risk	Front Line Defenders	
Italy	Premio Omelas	Amnesty International	
Netherlands	Human Rights Tulip	Ministry of Foreign Affairs (Netherlands)	
Netherlands	International Children's Peace Prize	KidsRights Foundation	
Norway	University of Oslo's Human Rights Award	University of Oslo	
Norway	Thorolf Rafto Memorial Prize	Rafto Foundation for Human Rights	
Norway	Andrei Sakharov Freedom Award	Norwegian Helsinki Committee	
Norway	Stefanus Prize	Stefanus Alliance International	
Norway	Student Peace Prize	Student Peace Prize Secretariat	
Romania	Valeriu Boboc Prize	Senate of Romania	
Spain	Jaime Brunet International Prize	Public University of Navarre	
Sweden	Anna Lindh Prize	Anna Lindh Memorial Fund	
Sweden	Olof Palme Prize	Olof Palme Memorial Fund for International Understanding and Common Security	
Sweden	Right Livelihood Award	Right Livelihood Award Foundation	
Switzerland	Martin Ennals Award for Human Rights Defenders	Amnesty International etc.	
Switzerland	Giuseppe Motta Medal	Geneva Institute for Democracy and Development	
United Kingdom	Ambassador of Conscience Award	Amnesty International	
United Kingdom	Amnesty International UK Media Awards	Amnesty International	
United Kingdom	Prize For Freedom	Liberal International	
United Kingdom	Longford Prize	Prison Reform Trust	
United Kingdom	Anna Politkovskaya Award	Reach All Women in WAR	

== Oceania ==
Country	Award	Sponsor	Given for
Australia	Human Rights Awards (Australia)	Australian Human Rights Commission	Contribution to Australian society of a wide variety of men and women committed to issues of human rights, social justice and equality
Australia	National Indigenous Human Rights Awards	New South Wales parliament	Contribution of Indigenous Australians to human rights and social justice

== See also ==
- Lists of awards
