= Lists of awards =

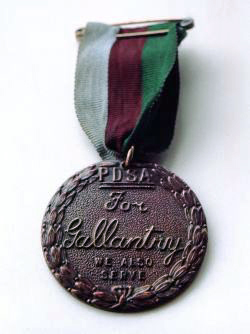
The Dickin Medal of the People's Dispensary for Sick Animals

Lists of awards cover awards given in various fields, including arts and entertainment, sports and hobbies, the humanities, science and technology, business, and service to society. A given award may be found in more than one list. Awards may be given by a government agency, an association such as the International Cricket Council, a company, a magazine such as Motor Trend, or an organization like Terrapinn Holdings that runs events. Some awards have significant financial value, while others mainly provide recognition. The lists include awards that are no longer being given.

== By subject area ==
=== Arts and entertainment ===
- Animation
- Art
  - Olympic medalists
- Beauty pageants
- Choreography
- Comedy and humor
- Comics
  - Manga
- Fashion
- Film
  - Pornographic
  - Screenwriting
- Performing arts
  - Acting
  - Dance
  - Music
    - Italian
    - Women
  - Theater
- Photography
- Radio
- Supporting actor
- Television
- Web
- Webcomics

=== Business and industry ===
- Adult industry
- Advertising
- Agriculture
  - Cannabis
- Aviation
- Business and industry
- Computer-related
- Design
- Food and drink
- Media
  - Journalism
- Motor vehicle
- Occupational health and safety
- Quality
- Toys and children's media

=== Education ===
- Academic
- Education
- Science communication
- Student

=== Humanities ===
- Archaeology
- Culture
- History
- Humanities
- Language
- Law
- Literary
  - Women
  - Poetry
  - Writing
- Philosophy
- Politics
- Religion
  - Ecclesiastical

=== Recreation ===
- Board games
  - Board game of the Year
- Game
  - Game of the Year
  - Video games
- Numismatics
- Philately
- Professional wrestling
- Sports
  - Women
- Sports journalism

=== Service to society ===
- Bravery
- Civil
- Contributions to society
- Human rights
- Humanitarian and service
- Intellectual freedom
- Intelligence and espionage
- Law enforcement
  - United States
- Military decorations
  - Highest
  - Gulf War
  - World War II
  - Wound
- Peace prizes
- Scouting
- Volunteer

=== Sciences ===
==== Natural sciences ====
- Architecture
- Astronomy
- Biochemistry
- Biology
  - Ornithology
- Biomedical science
- Chemistry
- Computer science
- Earth sciences
  - Meteorology
  - Oceanography
  - Paleontology
- Engineering
  - Mechanical engineering
- Geology
- Geophysics
- Mathematics
- Medicine
- Physics
- Science and technology
  - For women
  - Space technology

==== Social sciences ====
- Social sciences
- Anthropology
- Economics
- Environmental
- Geography
- Psychology
- Sociology

== By awarding entity ==
- American Library Association
- British Academy
- Children's Book Council of Australia
- Governor General of Canada
- Institute of Electrical and Electronics Engineers
- Institute of Physics
- UNESCO Literacy
- PEN International
- Women's National Basketball League

== By type of recipient ==
- African Americans
- Black Canadians
- Canadian
- Ghanaian
- Sikh
- Singapore
- Sri Lanka
- LGBTQ
  - Literary
- Women
  - Media
  - Science and technology
  - Sports

== Other criteria ==
- Challenge
- Early career
- Lifetime achievement
- Gold medal
- Honorary society
- Mocking
- "Nobel of a field"
- Named after people
- Named after governors-general of Canada

== Miscellaneous awards ==
- All-America City Award (National Civic League)
- Chap of the Year (The Chap)
- Confederate Medal of Honor (Sons of Confederate Veterans)
- Dickin Medal (People's Dispensary for Sick Animals)
- The Duke of Edinburgh's Award, a youth self-improvement awards programme in the United Kingdom
- Guinness World Records
- Order of the Smile – given by children to adults distinguished in their love, care, and aid for children
- Papal honorary flag of distinction for contributing ships' logs to science
- Pipe Smoker of the Year (British Pipesmokers' Council)
- Rear of the Year (Rear of the Year Ltd)
- Segrave Trophy (British) – for "Outstanding Skill, Courage and Initiative on Land, Water and in the Air"
- Southern Cross of Honor (United Daughters of the Confederacy)
