= List of awards and honours received by Desmond Tutu =

This is a list of awards given to Desmond Tutu.

Year	Award	Place
1978	Honorary Doctorate of Divinity	General Theological Seminary, United States of America
1978	Fellow of King's College London	London, England
1978	Honorary Doctorate of Civil Law	University of Kent, England
1979	Honorary Doctorate of Laws	Harvard University, United States of America
1980	Prix d'Athene	Onassis Foundation, Greece
1981	Honorary Doctorate of Theology	Ruhr University, Bochum, West Germany
1981	Honorary Doctorate of Divinity	University of Aberdeen, Scotland
1981	Newsmaker of the year	Southern African Society of Journalists, South Africa
1982	Honorary Doctorate of Sacred Theology	Columbia University, United States of America
1983	Family of Man Gold Medal Award	
1984	Martin Luther King Jr. Humanitarian Award	United States of America
1984	Nobel Peace Prize	Oslo, Norway
1984	Honorary Doctorate of Humane Letters	Saint Paul's College, Virginia, United States of America
1984	Honorary Doctorate of Laws	Claremont Graduate University, United States of America
1984	Honorary Doctorate of Sacred Theology	Dickinson College, United States of America
1984	Honorary Doctorate of Humane Letters	Howard University, United States of America
1985	Freedom of the City	Reggio Emilia, Italy
1985	Freedom of the City	Florence, Italy
1985	Honorary Doctorate of Divinity	University of Rochester, United States of America
1986	Freedom of the City	Merthyr Tydfil, Wales
1986	Magubela prize for liberty	
1987	Freedom of the City	Durham, England
1987	Pacem in Terris Award	United States of America
1987	Honorary Doctorate of Laws	University of the West Indies, West Indies
1988	Chancellor of the University of the Western Cape	Cape Town, South Africa
1988	Honorary Doctorate of Laws	Mount Allison University, Canada
1989	Third World Prize (jointly)	
1990	Freedom of the City	Lewisham, England
1990	Freedom of the City	Kinshasa, Democratic Republic of the Congo
1990	Honorary Degree	Oxford University, England
1990	Honorary Doctor of Humane Letters	University of Missouri-Kansas City, United States of America
1990	Honorary Doctor of Laws	Brown University, Providence, RI, United States of America
1991	Fellow of the African Academy of Sciences	Nairobi, Kenya
1992	Bishop John T. Walker Distinguished Humanitarian Service Award	
1993	Honorary Doctorate	Albion College, Albion, Michigan, USA
1994	Doctor of Laws (honoris causa)	The Australian National University, Canberra, Australia
1995	Chaplain and Sub-Prelate of Venerable Order of Saint John	International
1996	Archbishop of Canterbury's Award for Outstanding Service to the Anglican Communion	Lambeth Palace, England
1997	Humanitarian Award	African Times, New York, United States of America
1997	Bill of Rights Award	American Civil Liberation Union Fund, United States of America
1997	ROBIE award	Jackie Robinson Foundation, New York, United States of America
1998	Grand Officer of the Légion d'honneur	France
1998	Four Freedoms Award	Middelburg, The Netherlands
1998	Honorary Degree	Bishop's University, Canada
1999	Albert Schweitzer Humanitarian Award	United States of America
1999	Grand Cross of the Order of Merit of the Federal Republic of Germany	Germany
1999	Dedicatee of the Annual Survey of American Law	New York University School of Law, United States of America
1999	Recipient of the Gold Class of the Order for Meritorious Service	South Africa
1999	Sydney Peace Prize	Sydney, Australia
1999	Freedom of the City	Kingston upon Hull, England
1999	Honorary Doctorate of Divinity	University of Cambridge, England
1999	Honorary Doctorate	Florida International University, United States of America
1999	Honorary Doctorate	University of Hull, England
1999	Wilberforce Medal	England
1999	Honorary Doctor of Public Service	The George Washington University, United States of America
2000	Delta Prize for Global Understanding	Atlanta, United States of America
2000	Honorary Doctorate of Laws	University of Toronto, Canada
2000	Honorary Degree	Yale University, United States of America
2000	Honorary Doctorate of Divinity	University of Trinity College, Canada
2000	Honorary Doctorate of Laws	University of Alberta, Canada
2000	Honorary Doctorate of Humanities	Seattle University, United States of America
2000	Honorary Doctorate	Pompeu Fabra University, Spain
2000	Honorary Doctorate of Laws	Osgoode Hall Law School, Canada
2000	Honorary Degree	University of Oklahoma, United States of America
2000	Athenagoras Prize for Human Rights	Chicago, United States of America
2001	One room named for Desmond Tutu at Southwark Cathedral	London, England
2001	Honorary Degree	Fort Hare University, South Africa
2002	Honorary Doctorate	Vaal University of Technology, South Africa
2002	Honorary Doctorate of Humane Letters	University of Washington, United States of America
2002	Honorary Doctorate	Potchefstroom University, South Africa
2002	Honorary Doctorate of Theology	University of Pretoria, South Africa
2002	Dr. Jean Mayer Global Citizenship Award	Tufts University, Medford, Massachusetts, United States of America
2003	International Advocate for Peace Award	Cardozo School of Law, United States of America
2003	Honorary Doctorate of Humane Letters	University of Pennsylvania, Philadelphia, Pennsylvania, United States of America
2003	Honorary Doctorate of Humane Letters	Elon University, Elon, North Carolina, United States of America
2003	Honorary Doctorate of Laws	Rhodes University, South Africa
2003	Golden Plate Award	Academy of Achievement, United States of America
2003	Honorary Doctorate of Divinity	Willamette University, United States of America
2003	Père Marquette Discovery Award	Marquette University, United States of America
2003	James Parks Morton Interfaith Award	Interfaith Center of New York, United States of America
2004	Desmond Tutu HIV Centre founded	Cape Town, South Africa
2004	Honorary Doctorate	Warsaw University, Poland
2004	Desmond Tutu Centre for War and Peace founded	Liverpool Hope University, England
2004	Honorary Doctorate of Laws	University of British Columbia, Canada
2005	Action Against Hunger Humanitarian Award	New York City, United States of America
2005	Honorary Doctorate of Humane Letters	Berea College, United States of America
2005	Gandhi Peace Prize	India
2005	Honorary Doctorate of Humane Letters	University of North Florida, United States of America
2005	Desmond Tutu TB Centre founded	Stellenbosch University, South Africa
2005	Honorary Doctorate of Humane Letters	Fordham University, United States of America
2005	Desmond Tutu Education Center founded	General Theological Seminary, United States of America
2005	Chartered Institute of Public Relations' President's Medal	Harrogate, England
2005	Honorary Doctorate	Ghent University, Belgium
2006	Union Medal	Union Theological Seminary, United States of America
2006	Light of Truth Award from the International Campaign for Tibet	Brussels, Belgium
2006	Desmond Tutu Centre for the ARROW Project founded	Plymouth, England
2006	Honorary Doctorate in Public Service	The College of William & Mary, United States of America
2006	Gandhi King Ikeda Community Builders Prize	Morehouse College, United States of America
2006	King Hussein Prize	New York, United States of America
2007	Honorary Doctorate in Education	Nelson Mandela Metropolitan University, South Africa
2007	Alumnus of the Year	King's College London, England
2007	Mahatma Gandhi Global Nonviolence Award	James Madison University, United States of America
2007	Honorary Doctorate of Laws	University of Ulster, Northern Ireland
2007	Profiles in Courage Award	Danish Kennedy Society, Denmark
2007	Honorary Fellowship	Guild of Church Musicians, London, England
2007	Tutu Foundation UK launched	London, England
2007	Marion Doenhoff Prize for International Reconciliation and Understanding	Germany
2007	Washington National Cathedral Prize for Advancement in Religious Understanding	Washington, United States of America
2007	Honorary Doctorate of Humane Letters	University of Pittsburgh, United States of America
2007	Honorary Doctorate of Humane Letters	Carnegie Mellon University, United States of America
2007	Honorary Doctorate	Wheelock College, United States of America
2007	Honorary Doctorate of Humanities	James Madison University, United States of America
2007	Honorary Doctorate	Queen's University Belfast, Northern Ireland
2007	Giuseppe Motta Medal	Geneva Institute for Democracy and Development, Switzerland
2008	OUTSPOKEN Award	International Gay and Lesbian Human Rights Commission, San Francisco, United States of America
2008	Lincoln Leadership Prize	Abraham Lincoln Presidential Library Foundation, Chicago, United States of America
2008	J. William Fulbright Prize for International Understanding	United States Department of State, United States of America
2009	Spiritual Leadership Award	Humanity's Team, Pretoria, South Africa
2009	Honorary Doctorate in Theology	Faculty of Protestant Theology at the University of Vienna, Austria
2009	Honorary Doctorate of Theology	University of Vienna, Austria
2009	Honorary Doctorate	University of Geneva, Switzerland
2009	Honorary Doctorate	Bangor University, Wales
2009	Presidential Medal of Freedom	United States of America
2010	The Juliet Hollister Awards	New York, USA
2010	Bynum Tudor Fellow	Kellogg College, Oxford, England
2010	Audie Awards for Audiobook of the Year and Multi-Voiced Performance for Nelson Mandela's Favorite African Folktales	Audio Publishers Association
2011	Global Treasure Award of the Skoll Foundation	Oxford, England
2012	Honorary Doctorate of Theology	University of Groningen, Netherlands
2014	International Catalonia Prize	Barcelona, Catalonia
2015	Honorary Companion of Honour (CH)	Commonwealth realms
2015	Audie Awards for Audiobook of the Year and Original Work for Mandela: An Audio History	Audio Publishers Association
2017	Bailiff Grand Cross of the Order of St John (GCStJ)	Commonwealth realms
