= Drew Halfmann =

American sociologist (born 1967)

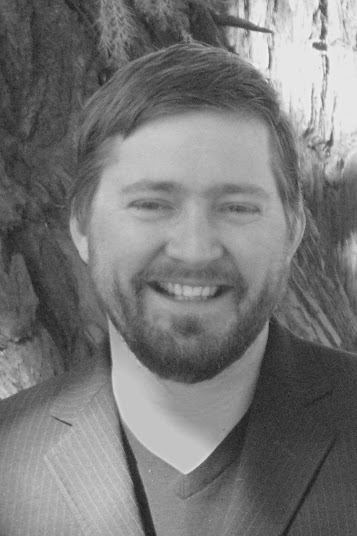
- Born: 28 June 1967 (age 59); Lansing, Michigan
- Education: University of Wisconsin-Madison (B.A.); New York University (Ph.D.)
- Known for: Doctors and Demonstrators: How Political Institutions Shape Abortion Law in the United States, Britain, and Canada
- Scientific career
- Fields: Social policy Social welfare Historical sociology
- Workplaces: University of California, Davis
- Doctoral advisor: Edwin Amenta; Craig Calhoun; Jeff Goodwin

Drew Halfmann (born June 28, 1967) is an American sociologist best known for his research on social policy in the United States.

== Career ==
Drew Halfmann is currently associate professor of sociology at the University of California, Davis.

His book Doctors and Demonstrators: How Political Institutions Shape Abortion Law in the United States, Britain, and Canada (University of Chicago Press, 2011), which won the 2012 Charles Tilly Award for Best Book from the American Sociological Association section on Collective Behavior and Social Movements, explains that abortion law remains contentious in the United States mainly due to permeability of political parties by social movements. This, Halfmann argues, is in contrast to abortion law in Britain and Canada, where the topic is a settled issue, experienced now in politics merely as a medical matter.

Halfmann's work has appeared in The American Sociological Review, Mobilization, Social Problems, Health, and other academic journals.

Halfmann earned his doctorate at New York University in 2001. He spent his undergraduate years at the University of Wisconsin-Madison.

== Awards ==
- The Distinguished Scholarship Award, Pacific Sociological Association, 2013.
- Charles Tilly Award for Best Book, American Sociological Association Section on Collective Behavior and Social Movements, 2012.
- Reinhard Bendix Prize for Best Graduate Student Paper, American Sociological Association Section on Comparative and Historical Sociology, 2000.

== Selected bibliography ==
- Halfmann, Drew. 2011. Doctors and Demonstrators: How Political Institutions Shape Abortion Law in the United States, Britain, and Canada. Chicago: University of Chicago Press.
- Halfmann, Drew. 2011. "Recognizing medicalization and demedicalization: Discourses, practices, and identities." Health 16(2):186-207.
- Halfmann, Drew and Michael P. Young. 2010. "War pictures: The grotesque as a mobilizing tactic." Mobilization: An International Quarterly 15(1):1-24.
- Halfmann, Drew, Kim Ebert, and Jesse Rude. 2005. "The biomedical legacy in minority health policy-making, 1975–2002." Research in the Sociology of Health Care 23:245-275.
- Halfmann, Drew. 2003. "Historical priorities and the responses of doctors' associations to abortion reform proposals in Britain and the United States 1960-1973." Social Problems 50(4):567-592.
- Amenta, Edwin and Drew Halfmann. 2000. "Wage wars: Institutional politics, WPA wages, and the struggle for US social policy." American Sociological Review 65(4):506-528.
- Amenta, Edwin, Drew Halfmann, and Michael P. Young. 1999. "The strategies and contexts of social protest: Political mediation and the impact of the Townsend Movement in California." Mobilization: An International Quarterly 4(1):1-23.
