= John Foran =

John Foran may refer to:

- John Foran (sociologist) (born 1955), American sociologist
- John Winston Foran (born 1952), Canadian politician
- John Foran (rugby league), British rugby league footballer
- John Francis Foran (1913–2014), California politician
