= Cecilia Menjívar =

American academic

Academic background
- Education: University of Southern California (BA, MS); University of California, Davis (PhD)
- Thesis: Salvadoran migration to the United States: The dynamics of social networks in international migration. (1992)

Academic work
- Institutions: University of California, Los Angeles, Arizona State University, University of Kansas
- Notable works: Fragmented Ties: Salvadoran Immigrant Networks in America (2000), Enduring Violence: Ladina Women's Lives in Guatemala (2011)
- Website: https://soc.ucla.edu/people/cecilia-menjívar

Cecilia Menjívar, born and raised in El Salvador, is an American sociologist who has made significant contributions to the study of international migration, the structural roots of inequalities, state power, gender-based violence against women, and legal regimes. Menjívar is currently Distinguished Professor of sociology at the University of California, Los Angeles where she holds the Dorothy L. Meier Social Equities Chair and directs the UCLA Center for the Study of International Migration (CSIM).

== Education ==
Menjívar received a Bachelor of Arts in Psychology and Sociology from the University of Southern California in 1981, and a Master of Science in International Education from the same university in 1983. Menjívar then completed her doctoral studies at the University of California, Davis, graduating in 1992 with a PhD in sociology. Menjívar completed post-doctoral fellowships at the University of California, Berkeley and RAND Corporation.

== Career ==
Menjívar worked at Arizona State University from 1996 to 2015, initially as an assistant professor before becoming an associate professor and finally Cowden Distinguished Professor and associate director in the School of Social and Family Dynamics. Menjívar then moved to the University of Kansas where she was Foundation Distinguished Professor in the Department of Sociology and co-director of the Center for Migration Research. Since 2018, Menjívar has been professor and Dorothy L. Meier Social Equities Chair in the Department of Sociology at the University of California, Los Angeles. She was elected vice president 2014-2015 and the 113th president of the American Sociological Association 2021–2022.

== Reception ==
Menjívar's first book, Fragmented Ties, received the 2001 William J. Goode Outstanding Book Award from the American Sociological Association's Section on Family, among other recognitions. Her second book, Enduring Violence received the Distinguished Scholarship Award from the Pacific Sociological Association, the Mirra Komarovsky Book Award from the Eastern Sociological Society, and the Hubert Herring Best Book Award from the Pacific Council on Latin American Studies. Her articles also have been recognized with multiple awards.

== Selected Books ==
- Menjívar, Cecilia. Fragmented Ties: Salvadorian Immigrant Networks in America. University of California Press (2000).
- Menjívar, Cecilia, Nestor P. Rodríguez. (Eds.) When States Kill: Latin America, the US, and Technologies of Terror. University of Texas Press (2005).
- Menjívar, Cecilia. Enduring Violence: Ladina Women's Lives in Guatemala. University of California Press (2011).
- Menjívar, Cecilia and Daniel Kanstroom. Constructing Immigrant "Illegality": Critiques, Experiences, and Responses, Cambridge University Press (2014)
- Menjívar, Cecilia. Leisy Abrego and Leah Schmalzbauer. Immigrant Families. Polity, (2016).
- Menjívar, Cecilia, Marie Ruiz and Immanuel Ness. (Eds.) The Oxford Handbook of Migration Crises. Oxford University Press (2019).

== Award ==
- Jessie Bernard Award, American Sociological Association (2024)
- Public Understanding of Sociology Award, American Sociological Association (2024)
- Elected W.E.B DuBois Fellow, American Academy of Political and Social Research (2023)
- Andrew Carnegie Fellowship (2017)
- John Simon Guggenheim Fellowship (2014)
- Distinguished Career Award, International Migration Section (2020), American Sociological Association
- Julian Samora Distinguished Career Award (2010), Latinos/as Section, American Sociological Association
