= Anna-Halya Horbach =

Ukrainian translator and activist

Anna-Galya Gorbach, née Lutsyak (2 March 1924 - 11 June 2011) was a Ukrainian literary critic, translator of Ukrainian literature into German, publisher, and public and political figure. Doctor of Philosophy, member of the National Writers' Union of Ukraine (1993), corresponding member of the Shevchenko Scientific Society in Europe, winner of the Ivan Franko literary prize (1994), the Vasyl Stus award of the Ukrainian Association of Independent Creative Intelligentsia (1993), the Triumph Award (2001), the Olena Teliga (2009), Panteleimon Kulish (2019). A wife of a Ukrainian philologist and publisher Oleksa Gorbach. One of the most famous and active personalities in the Ukrainian cultural and intellectual world of the Ukrainian diaspora.

== Life ==
Anna-Galya Gorbach was born on 2 March 1924 in the Subcarpathian village of Brodina (Southern Bucovina, Romania). Until December 1940 she went to a Romanian school, then she was educated in Germany.

Gorbach took an active part in the work of the German section of Amnesty International. She was engaged in informing the world community about political repressions in Ukraine in the 60s and 80s. She co-organized protest campaigns in defense of Vasyl Stus, Ivan Svitlychny, Mykola Horbal, Viacheslav Chornovil, and other Ukrainian prisoners of conscience, and corresponded with them actively.

== Work ==
Gorbach translated into German and published works by Mykhailo Kotsyubynsky and Hnat Khotkevych, Vasyl Stus, Evhen Sverstyuk, Valerii Marchenko, Ihor Kalynets, Valerii Shevchuk, Yurii Andrukhovych, etc., a total of about 50 translations. She edited and published in German 6 anthologies of Ukrainian prose - "Blue November", "Well for the thirsty" and Ukrainian short stories about Chornobyl. Gorbach was the initiator of a series of German-language translations of Samvydav Ukrainy. She published articles in German and Ukrainian on Ukrainian-German and Ukrainian-Romanian literary relations.

Gorbach is an author of "Epic Stylistic Means of Cossack Dumas" (1950), "Olga Kobylyanska and German Culture" (1967), and "Ukrainian Carpathian Tales" (1975). She is also a publisher of 15 Ukrainian anthologies.

In 1995, together with her husband Oleksa Gorbach, she founded the Brodina Verlag publishing house, which published and distributed works by Ukrainian writers in Germany. The Gorbachs initiated the creation of the only specialized department of Ukrainian studies in Germany at the University of Greifswald.

Gorbach devoted the last years of her life to publishing the works of her husband, Oleksa Gorbach. In particular, his study "Argo in Ukraine" was published in Lviv in 2006.

Anna-Galya Gorbach lived in Reichelsheim, Germany, where she died on 11 June 2011.

== Selected works ==
=== Translations into German ===
- Bluer November: Ukrainische Erzähler unseres Jarhunderts (Blue November. Ukrainian Prose Writers of Our Century: An Anthology of Prose),1959, Heidelberg;
- Ein Brunnen für Durstige (A Well for the Thirsty and Other Ukrainian Stories),1970, Tübingen;
- Kalynets Ihor. Bilanz Des Schweigens (Poems by Ihor Kalynets), 1975, Darmstad;
- Hejfetz M. Sorokas Rosenstrauch (A story about Ukrainian political prisoners in a concentration camp), 1984, Hamburg

=== Publications ===
- Tymish Khmelnytsky in Romanian historiography and literature. "Scientific Notes of the Ukrainian Technical and Economic Institute", 1969, vol. 19;
- German criticism of the Ukrainian samvydav, "Modernity", 1985, No. 7-8;
- Ukrainian theme in German literature, Reichelsheim-Berfurt, 1993;
- Give me a lute made of stone: Ukrainian poetry of the twentieth century, 1996, Reichelsheim

== Awards and honors ==
- Ivan Franko International Prize of the Writers' Union of Ukraine (1994).
- Order of Princess Olga III degree (2006).
- Order of Merit of the Federal Republic of Germany (2006)
- Olena Teliga Award (2009).
