= CBSM =

CBSM as an abbreviation or initialism may stand for:

- CBSM-FM, a radio station
- Central Bank of San Marino
- Collective Behavior and Social Movements Section of the ASA, a sociological organization
- Community-based social marketing, which fosters ecologically sustainable behavior; see section on applications
