= List of intellectual freedom awards =

This list of intellectual freedom awards is an index to articles about notable awards celebrating intellectual freedom, specifically freedoms of thought, speech, and expression; this includes press and academic freedom. General human rights awards are not included, unless their primary focus is on intellectual freedom. The list is organized by the country of the sponsor of the award, but awards are not necessarily limited to people from that country.

== Journalism awards ==
Country	Award	Sponsor	Given for
Argentina	Rodolfo Walsh Prize	National University of La Plata	Awarded to Hugo Chávez of Venezuela in 2011 for "unquestionable and authentic commitment" to media that support "human rights, truth and democratic values".
Austria	World Press Freedom Heroes	International Press Institute	Significant contributions to the maintenance of press freedom and freedom of expression
Canada	International Press Freedom Award	Canadian Journalists for Free Expression	Journalists from Canada and around the world who have been persecuted because of their work
Denmark	Sappho Award	Danish Free Press Society	Journalist who combines excellence in their work with courage and a refusal to compromise
Germany	Golden Pen of Freedom Award	World Association of Newspapers and News Publishers	To recognise the outstanding action, in writing or deed, of an individual, a group or an institution in the cause of press freedom
International	Guillermo Cano World Press Freedom Prize	UNESCO	Person, organization or institution that has made an outstanding contribution to the defence and/or promotion of press freedom anywhere in the world, especially when this has been achieved in the face of danger
Poland	Freedom of Speech Award	International Association of Press Clubs	Outstanding contributions to the defense or the struggle for freedom of expression, the creation of conditions to support freedom of speech
Romania	Valeriu Boboc Prize	Senate of Romania	For the liberty of press and defending of democratic values
United Kingdom	Index Freedom of Expression Awards	Index on Censorship	To courageous journalists, artists, campaigners and digital activists from around the world who have made a significant contribution to free expression
United States	Tully Center for Free Speech Award	Tully Center for Free Speech	Awarded to a journalist who has survived a significant free speech threat
United States	International Press Freedom Award	Committee to Protect Journalists	Journalists or their publications around the world who show courage in defending press freedom despite facing attacks, threats, or imprisonment
United States	James Madison Freedom of Information Award	Society of Professional Journalists	Individuals and organizations who have made significant contributions to the advancement of freedom of expression, particularly freedom of information
United States	Payne Award for Ethics in Journalism	University of Oregon	Journalist of integrity and character who reports with insight and clarity in the face of political or economic pressures and to reward performance that inspires public trust in the media

== General awards ==
Country	Award	Sponsor	Given for
Europe	Sakharov Prize	European Parliament	The Sakharov Prize for Freedom of Thought, named after Soviet scientist and dissident Andrei Sakharov, was established in December 1988 by the European Parliament as a means to honor individuals or organisations who have dedicated their lives to the defense of human rights and freedom of thought.
Germany	Geschwister-Scholl-Preis	Börsenverein des Deutschen Buchhandels	Annual award for a book which "shows intellectual independence and supports civil freedom, moral, intellectual and aesthetic courage and that gives an important impulse to the present awareness of responsibility"
Germany	Leipzig Human Rights Award	European-American Citizens Committee for Human Rights and Religious Freedom in the USA	Efforts towards human rights and freedom of expression in the USA
India	National RTI Awards	Public Cause Research Foundation	Protecting the right to freedom of information
Norway	Bjørnson Prize	Norwegian Academy of Literature and Freedom of Expression	Promoting understanding of other cultures and for literary free speech
Norway	Fritt Ord Award	Fritt Ord organization	Awarded in support of freedom of speech and freedom of expression
United States	Franklyn S. Haiman Award for Distinguished Scholarship in Freedom of Expression	National Communication Association	Outstanding published research on freedom of expression
United States	Free Speech Award	American INSIGHT	American INSIGHT is a Philadelphia-based non-profit dedicated to the promotion of Free Speech and the Rule of Law. The organization holds an annual Free Speech Film Festival where it screens documentaries from around the world that promote the organization's message. The Free Speech Award is bestowed upon one standout documentary.
United States	Free Speech Defender Awards	National Coalition Against Censorship	Defend freedom of thought, inquiry, and expression from censorship and threats of censorship through education and outreach, and direct advocacy
United States	Freedom of Speech Award	Roosevelt Institute's Four Freedoms Award	
United States	Hal Freeman 'Freedom Isn't Free' Award	Free Speech Coalition	
United States	Luther McNair Award	ACLU of Massachusetts	For significant contributions to civil liberties
United States	Spirit of Americana Free Speech Award	Americana Music Honors & Awards	Those who use their music to make a difference, lending a voice to those who would otherwise go unheard and shining a light on issues that would otherwise go unseen
United States	AAAS Award for Scientific Freedom and Responsibility	American Association for the Advancement of Science	Scientists and engineers whose exemplary actions, often taken at significant personal cost, have served to foster scientific freedom and responsibility and increased scientific awareness throughout the world
United States	Eli M. Oboler Award	American Library Association	For best published work in intellectual freedom
United States	Hugh M. Hefner First Amendment Award	Hugh M. Hefner Foundation	Awarded to those who have made significant contributions to the protection and enhancement of the rights enshrined in the First Amendment to the United States Constitution.
United States	Barbara Goldsmith Freedom to Write Award	PEN America	Writers anywhere in the world who have fought courageously in the face of adversity for the right to freedom of expression
United States	Katherine Anne Porter First Amendment Award	PEN America	U.S. resident who has fought courageously, despite adversity, to safeguard the First Amendment right to freedom of expression as it applies to the written word
United States	Newman's Own First Amendment Award	PEN America	U.S. resident who fought courageously, despite adversity, to safeguard the First Amendment right to freedom of expression as it applies to the written word
United States	The Richard D. McLellan Prizes for Advancing Free Speech and Expression	The Russell Kirk Center	
United States	Václav Havel Prize for Creative Dissent	Human Rights Foundation	Individuals who engage in creative dissent, exhibiting courage and creativity to challenge injustice and live in truth
United States	William J. Brennan Award	Association of the Federal Bar of the State of New Jersey	Those whose actions have advanced the principles of free expression
United States	William J. Brennan Award	Thomas Jefferson Center for the Protection of Free Expression	Individual or group whose commitment to free expression is consistent with Justice Brennan's abiding devotion
United States	William O. Douglas Prize	Commission on Freedom of Expression of the Speech Communication Association	Those who contribute to writing about freedom of speech

== Ironic / Anti-Awards ==
These awards celebrate intellectual freedom by calling attention to those who harm it.

- Muzzle Awards, by the Thomas Jefferson Center for the Protection of Freedom of Expression

== See also ==
- Lists of awards
- List of human rights awards
