= Geva (disambiguation) =

Geva (Hebrew: גֶּבַע, lit. Hill) is a kibbutz in the Jezreel Valley in Israel

Geva may also refer to:

- Geva' Parashim, the modern Tel Shush
- Geva Carmel, Israeli moshav
- Geva Theatre Center, New York, USA
- Geva Films, film studio, Israel

== Given name ==
- Geva Mentor, English netball player
- Geva Alon, Israeli blues/folk/rock musician and singer-songwriter

== Surname ==
- Eli Geva, Israeli brigade commander
- Dorit Geva, American sociologist
- Dudu Geva, Israeli cartoonist, illustrator, and comic book creator
- Miki Geva, Israeli stand-up comedian and actor
- Tamara Geva, Soviet and American actress
- Tsibi Geva, Israeli educator and music/art critic
