= The Pacific Sociological Association Distinguished Scholarship Award =

The Distinguished Scholarship Award is given by the Pacific Sociological Association (PSA) to sociologists based in the Pacific region of North America, in recognition of major scholarly contributions. To be eligible for the award, a sociologist's contribution must be embodied in a recently published book or through a series of articles with a common theme.

== Recipients ==
The Distinguished Scholarship Award was created by the PSA in 1984. The award was given biennially until 1990, when it became an annually granted award.

- 1984 - No award given
- 1986 - Claude S. Fischer: To Dwell Among Friends: Personal Networks in Town and City
- 1988 - Unknown or No award given
- 1990 - Jack Katz: Seductions of Crime: Moral and Sensual Attraction to Doing Evil
- 1991 - George M. Thomas: "Revivalism and Cultural Change: Christianity, Nation Building, and the Market in 19th-Century United States"
- 1992 - Kathy Charmaz: "Good Days, Bad Days, The Self in Chronic Illness and Time"
- 1993 - Rodney Stark and William Sims Bainbridge: A Theory of Religion
- 1994 - David A. Snow and Leon Anderson, Down on Their Luck: A Study of Homeless Street People
- 1995 - John Foran: Fragile Resistance
- 1996 - James Aho: This Thing of Darkness: The Sociology of the Enemy
- 1997 - Calvin Morrill: The Executive Way : Conflict Management in Corporations
- 1998 - Simonetta Falasca-Zamponi: Fascist Spectacle: The Aesthetics of Power in Mussolini's Italy
- 1999 - William Domhoff: Who Rules America? Power and Politics in the Year 2000
- 2000 - Charles Varano: Forced Choices: Class, Community, and Worker Ownership
- 2001 - Valerie Jeness, University of California Irvine for a series of published articles dealing with hate-crimes, hate-crime legislation, and community responses to hate-motivated violence. The series was published in the following journals between 1994 and 1998: Gender and Society, Social Problems, Sociological Perspectives, Research in Social Movements, Conflict and Change, and the American Sociological Review.
- 2002 - Pierrett Hondagneu-Sotelo, University of Southern California: Domestica: Immigrant Workers Cleaning and Caring in the Shadows of Affluence
- 2003 - Amy Binder, University of California, San Diego: Contentious Curricula: Afrocentrism and Creationism in American Public Schools
- 2004 - Evelyn Nakano Glenn, University of California Berkeley: Unequal Freedom: How Race and Gender Shaped American Citizens and Laura Grindstaff, University of California Davis: The Money Shot: Trash, Class, and the Making of TV Talk Shows
- 2005 - No award given
- 2006 - John Foran, University of California Santa Barbara: Taking Power: On the Origins of Third World Revolutions and Paul Lichterman, University of Southern California: Elusive Togetherness: Church Groups Trying to Bridge America’s Divisions
- 2007 - Jerome Karabel, University of California Berkeley: The Chosen: The Hidden History of Admission and Exclusion at Harvard, Yale, and Princeton
- 2008 - Ivan Light, University of California Los Angeles: Deflecting Immigration: Networks, Markets and regulation in Los Angeles
- 2009 - Edward Telles and Vilma Ortiz, University of California Los Angeles: Generations of Exclusion: Mexican Americans, Assimilation, and Race
- 2010 - Kimberly Richman, University of San Francisco: Courting Change: Queer Parents, Judges, and the Transformation of American Family Law
- 2011 - Julie Shayne, University of Washington Bothell and University of Washington Seattle: They Used to Call Us Witches: Chilean Exiles, Culture, and Feminism
- 2012 - Cecilia Menjívar, Arizona State University: Enduring Violence: Latino Women's Lives in Guatemala
- 2013 - Drew Halfmann, University of California, Davis: Doctors and Demonstrators: How Political Institutions Shape Abortion Law in the United States, Britain, and Canada
- 2014 - Isaac William Martin, University of California, San Diego: Rich People’s Movements: Grassroots Campaigns to Untax the One Percent
- 2015 - Paul Almeida, University of California, Merced: Mobilizing Democracy: Globalization and Citizen Protest
- 2016 - Michael Messner (University of Southern California), Max Greenberg (University of Southern California), and Tal Peretz (Auburn University): Some Men: Feminist Allies and the Movement to End Violence Against Women
- 2017 - Allison Nasson, University of Puget Sound: Donor Friendly Victimhood: Narrative Construction as a Fundraising Strategy
- 2018 - Viraji Weeraseena, University of California, Riverside: The Structural Sources of Violent Crimes in Post-Civil War Sri Lanka
- 2019 - Abigail Leslie Andrews, University of California, San Diego: Undocumented Politics: Place, Gender, and the Pathways of Mexican Migrants
- 2020 - Ranita Ray, University of Nevada, Las Vegas: The Making of a Teenage Service Class: Poverty and Mobility in an American City
- 2021 - Tahseen Shams, University of Toronto: Here, There, and Elsewhere: The Making of Immigrant Identities in a Globalized World
- 2022 - Matthew Clair, Stanford University: Privilege and Punishment: How Race and Class Matter in Criminal Court
- 2023 - Nadia Y. Kim, Loyola Marymount University: Refusing Death: Immigrant Women and the Fight for Environmental Justice in LA

== See also ==
- List of social sciences awards
