= Institut de France =

French learned society

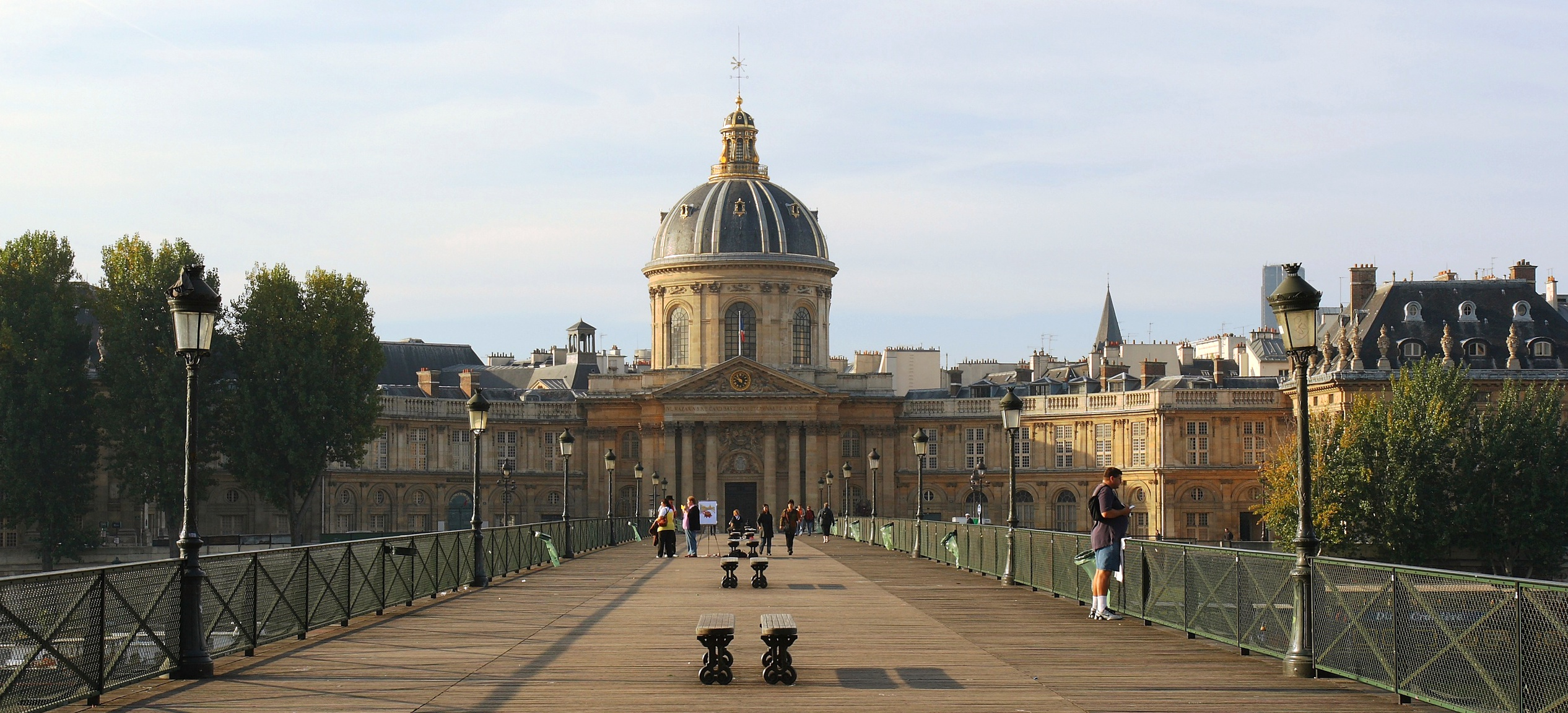
- The Institut de France and Pont des Arts on the Seine
- Formation: 25 October 1795; 230 years ago
- Founder: National Convention
- Type: Learned society
- Location: 6th arrondissement, Paris, France
- Coordinates: 48°51′26″N 2°20′13″E
- Protector: Emmanuel Macron (2017–present) (as President of France)
- Chancellor: Xavier Darcos (2018–present)
- Subsidiaries: Académie Française; Académie des inscriptions et belles-lettres; Académie des sciences; Académie des Beaux-Arts; Académie des sciences morales et politiques
- Website: institutdefrance.fr

The Institut de France (French for 'Institute of France'; French: [ɛ̃stity də fʁɑ̃s]) is a French learned society, grouping five académies, including the Académie Française. It was established in 1795 at the direction of the National Convention. Located on the Quai de Conti in the 6th arrondissement of Paris, the institute manages approximately 1,000 foundations, as well as museums and châteaux open for visit. It also awards prizes and subsidies, which amounted to a total of over €27 million per year in 2017. Most of these prizes are awarded by the institute on the recommendation of the académies.

== History ==
The building was originally constructed as the Collège des Quatre-Nations by Cardinal Mazarin, as a school for students from new provinces attached to France under Louis XIV. The inscription over the façade reads "JUL. MAZARIN S.R.E. CARD BASILICAM ET GYMNAS F.C.A M.D.C.LXI", attesting that Mazarin ordered its construction in 1661.

The Institut de France was established on 25 October 1795, by the National Convention.

On 1 January 2018, Xavier Darcos took office as the Institut de France's chancellor. Elected in 2017 to succeed Gabriel de Broglie, he was reelected in 2020. The chancellor acts as the institute's secretary general, whilst the organisation itself is placed under the protection of the president of the republic.

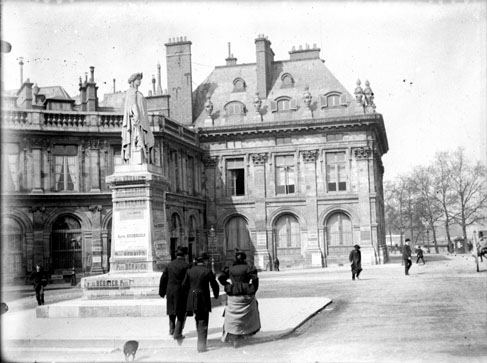
Esplanade in front of the institute, 1898

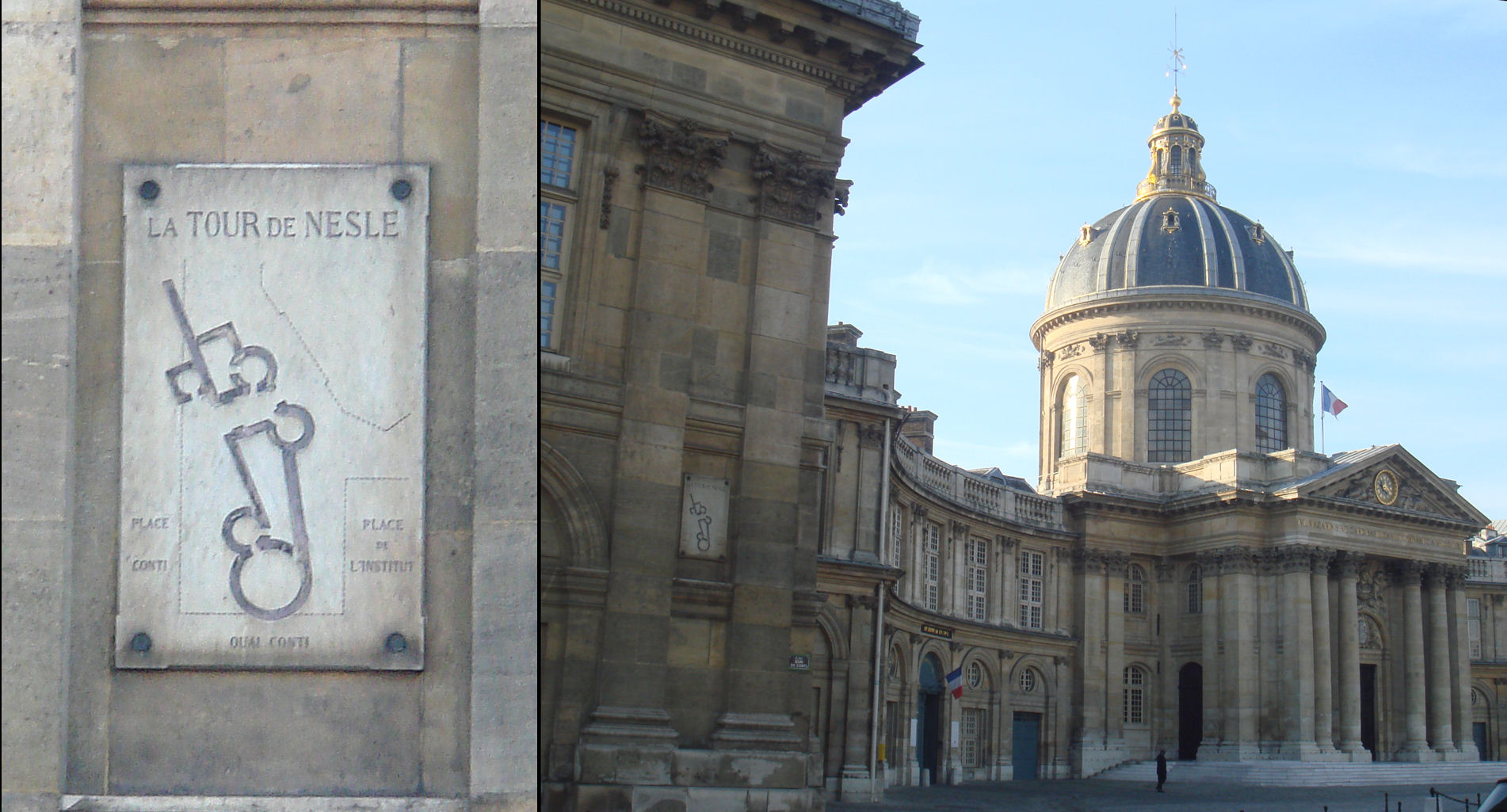
A plaque on the northern wall of the Institut de France shows the ancient location of the Tour de Nesle

== Académies ==
- Académie Française (French Academy, concerning the French language) – initiated in 1635, suppressed in 1793, and restored in 1803 as a division of the institute.
- Académie des inscriptions et belles-lettres (Academy of Humanities) – initiated 1663.
- Académie des sciences (Academy of Sciences) – initiated 1666.
- Académie des Beaux-Arts (Academy of Fine Arts) – created 1816 as the merger of:
  - The Académie de peinture et de sculpture (Academy of Painting and Sculpture, initiated 1648);
  - The Académie de musique (Academy of Music, initiated 1669) and;
  - The Académie d'architecture (Academy of Architecture, initiated 1671).
- Académie des sciences morales et politiques (Academy of Moral and Political Sciences) – initiated 1795, suppressed 1803, reestablished 1832.

== Influence ==
The Royal Society of Canada, initiated in 1882, was modeled after the Institut de France and the Royal Society of London.

The Lebanese Academy of Sciences, known officially by its French name "Académie des Sciences du Liban" (ASL), is broadly fashioned after the French Academy of Sciences, with which it continues to develop joint programmes.

== See also ==
- Collège des Quatre-Nations
- National academy
- List of museums in Paris
- List of honorary societies
