= List of politics awards =

This list of politics awards is an index to articles that describe notable awards related to politics. It includes awards for political science, for governance and civic leadership, and for books on political subjects. The list gives the country of the sponsoring organization, but awards are not necessarily limited to people from that country.

Country	Award	Sponsor	Description
United States	Arthur Ross Book Award	Council on Foreign Relations	Books that make an outstanding contribution to the understanding of foreign policy or international relations
United Kingdom	Bread and Roses Award	Alliance of Radical Booksellers	Best radical book published each year, with radical book defined as one that is "informed by socialist, anarchist, environmental, feminist and anti-racist concerns"
Germany	Bundestag Science Prize	Bundestag	Outstanding work about the parliamentary system
United Kingdom	Centre for Social Justice Awards	Centre for Social Justice	Organisations working in the field of poverty relief
United States	Charles E. Merriam Award for Outstanding Public Policy Research	University of Illinois at Urbana–Champaign	Outstanding public policy research
United Kingdom	Christopher Ewart-Biggs Memorial Prize	Ewart-Biggs Trust	Promote peace and reconciliation in Ireland, a greater understanding between the peoples of the United Kingdom and Ireland, or closer co-operation between partners of the European Community
Czechia and Slovakia	Czech and Slovak Transatlantic Award	Jagello 2000, Slovak Atlantic Commission	Personalities who have substantially contributed to freedom and democracy in Central Europe, to strengthening of the transatlantic relations and integration of Central Europe to Euro-Atlantic Institutions
United Kingdom	Deutscher Memorial Prize	Amiel-Melburn Trust	New book published in English which exemplifies the best and most innovative new writing in or about the Marxist tradition
Canada	Donner Prize	Donner Canadian Foundation	Books considered excellent in regard to the writing of Canadian public policy
United States	Dr. Nathan Davis Awards	American Medical Association	Elected and career public servants in national, state, and local governments for outstanding government service
United Kingdom	Duff Cooper Prize	Duff Cooper Memorial Fund	Best work of non-fiction published in the UK
Europe	Euromoney Finance Minister of the Year	Euromoney	Finance minister of the year
Europe	European Citizens' Prize	European Parliament	Individuals or groups who have particularly distinguished themselves in strengthening European integration by the expression of European cooperation, openness to others and practical involvement in the development of mutual understanding
Germany	Hannah Arendt Prize	Heinrich Böll Foundation	Individuals representing the tradition of political theorist Hannah Arendt, especially in regard to totalitarianism
Israel	Herzl Award	World Zionist Organization	Outstanding young men and women in recognition of their exceptional efforts on behalf of Israel and the Zionist cause
United States	Howland Memorial Prize	Yale University	Citizen of any country in recognition of some achievement of marked distinction in the field of literature or fine arts or the science of government
Germany	Ibn Rushd Prize for Freedom of Thought	Ibn-Rushd-Fund	Independent, forward-thinking, individuals or organisations who have contributed to democracy and freedom of speech in the Arab world
Sudan	Ibrahim Prize	Mo Ibrahim Foundation	Former African executive head of state or government
Sweden	Johan Skytte Prize in Political Science	Uppsala University	The scholar who has made the most valuable contribution to political science
International	Karl Deutsch Award	International Political Science Association	Prominent scholar engaged in cross-disciplinary research
United States	Lawrence O'Brien Award	Democratic National Committee	Individuals and groups who exhibit a high degree of commitment and self-sacrifice on behalf of the Democratic Party and its candidates
United States	Library of Congress Living Legend	Library of Congress	Someone recognized by the Library of Congress for their creative contributions to American life
Canada	Lionel Gelber Prize	Lionel Gelber Foundation	World's best non-fiction book in English on foreign affairs that seeks to deepen public debate on significant international issues
Russia	List of Umalatova awards	Party of Peace and Unity	various categories
United States	List of Wasserstein Fellows	Harvard Law School	Exemplary members of the bar who engage in public service
France	Order of La Pléiade	Organisation internationale de la Francophonie	People who particularly distinguished themselves in the service of the organisation's ideals of cooperation and friendship, promoting the role of the French language in their own countries or in the world
United Kingdom	Orwell Prize	University College London	Political writing
United Kingdom	Prize For Freedom	Liberal International	Outstanding contribution to human rights and political freedoms
Sweden	Right Livelihood Award	Right Livelihood Award Foundation	Those offering practical and exemplary answers to the most urgent challenges facing us today
United States	Rowman & Littlefield Award in Innovative Teaching	American Political Science Association	Developers of effective new approaches to teaching among political scientists
Scotland	Scottish Politician of the Year	The Herald (Glasgow)	Politician of the year
Canada	Shaughnessy Cohen Prize for Political Writing	Writers' Trust of Canada	Best nonfiction book on Canadian political and social issues
United States	Shorenstein Prize	Asia–Pacific Research Center	Excellence in journalism and understanding of Asia
Europe	Stein Rokkan Prize for Comparative Social Science Research	International Science Council etc.	Substantial and original contribution in comparative social science research
United Kingdom	Stonewall Awards	Stonewall (charity)	People who have affected the lives of British lesbian, gay, bi and trans people
United States	Susan Strange Award	International Studies Association	Person whose singular intellect, assertiveness, and insight most challenge conventional wisdom and intellectual and organizational complacency in the international studies community
Norway / Germany	Willy Brandt Prize	Willy Brandt prize foundation	Persons or institutions that make significant contributions to German-Norwegian relations
United Kingdom	World Leadership Awards	World Leadership Forum	City leaders who have shown exceptional imagination, foresight or resilience in a number of key fields
International	World Mayor	City Mayors Foundation	Those who have served their communities well and who have contributed to the well-being of cities, nationally and internationally

== See also ==
- Lists of awards
- Awards and honors presented to the 14th Dalai Lama
