= Nadia Y. Kim =

American sociologist

Academic background
- Education: University of California, Santa Barbara (BA); University of Michigan (MA, PhD)

Academic work
- Discipline: Sociology
- Sub-discipline: Race and ethnicity, immigration, environmental justice
- Institutions: Texas A&M University; Loyola Marymount University; Brandeis University

Nadia Y. Kim is an American sociologist whose research examines race, immigration, citizenship, transnationalism, and environmental justice. She is a professor of sociology and the George Sumey Jr. Professor of Liberal Arts at Texas A&M University. She is the author of Imperial Citizens: Koreans and Race from Seoul to LA (2008) and Refusing Death: Immigrant Women and the Fight for Environmental Justice in LA (2021), both published by Stanford University Press. Her books have been reviewed in academic journals including Contemporary Sociology, Social Forces, The Journal of Asian Studies, and the American Journal of Sociology.

== Education and career ==
Kim received bachelor's degrees in sociology and English from the University of California, Santa Barbara in 1996. She received a master's degree in sociology in 2000 and a Ph.D. in sociology in 2003 from the University of Michigan.

After completing her doctorate, Kim held a postdoctoral fellowship at the Center for Comparative Immigration Studies at the University of California, San Diego. She subsequently joined the faculty at Brandeis University, where she taught sociology and women's and gender studies from 2004 to 2007.

Kim joined the sociology faculty at Loyola Marymount University in 2007. During the 2018–2019 academic year, she was the Thomas Tam Visiting Professor at the CUNY Graduate Center, where her appointment was affiliated with the sociology doctoral program and the Asian American/Asian Research Institute.

Kim joined Texas A&M University in 2023 as a professor of sociology. In 2024, she was appointed to the George Sumey Jr. Professorship in Liberal Arts.

== Scholarship ==
Kim's scholarship addresses race and citizenship, immigration and transnationalism, Asian American experiences, and environmental justice.

=== Imperial Citizens ===
Kim's first book, Imperial Citizens: Koreans and Race from Seoul to LA, was published by Stanford University Press in 2008. Drawing on interviews and ethnographic research in South Korea and the United States, the book examines how racial ideas and hierarchies operate across national borders and shape the experiences of Koreans and Korean Americans.

The book received reviews across sociology and Asian studies. Jennifer Lee and James A. Bany reviewed Imperial Citizens in Contemporary Sociology, and Jiannbin Lee Shiao reviewed it in Social Forces. Ju Hui Judy Han reviewed the book in The Journal of Asian Studies. In a six-page review essay in Sociological Forum, Angie Y. Chung discussed Kim's transnational approach to the study of race, immigration, and Korean Americans.

=== Refusing Death ===
Kim's second monograph, Refusing Death: Immigrant Women and the Fight for Environmental Justice in LA, was published by Stanford University Press in 2021. The book examines environmental justice organizing among immigrant women in the Los Angeles area and the intersections of environmental inequality with race, class, gender, immigration, and citizenship.

Refusing Death was reviewed by Julie Sze in the American Journal of Sociology and by Howard Lune in Contemporary Sociology. Kevin Escudero reviewed the book in Gender & Society, and Sanchita Dasgupta reviewed it in Sociology of Race and Ethnicity.

== Awards and honors ==
Imperial Citizens received the 2009 Oliver Cromwell Cox Book Award from the American Sociological Association's Section on Racial and Ethnic Minorities and the 2009 Book Award from the association's Section on Asia and Asian America.

Refusing Death received several scholarly book awards. In 2022, it received the Distinguished Contribution to Scholarship Book Award from the American Sociological Association's Section on Race, Class, and Gender and the Outstanding Book Award from its Section on Asia and Asian America. In 2023, the Pacific Sociological Association awarded Kim its Distinguished Scholarship Award for Refusing Death. The book also received the Society for the Study of Social Problems' Eduardo Bonilla-Silva Outstanding Book Award and the Association for Asian American Studies' Outstanding Achievement in the Social Sciences Book Award.

== Selected works ==
=== Books ===
Kim, Nadia Y. (2008). Imperial Citizens: Koreans and Race from Seoul to LA. Stanford University Press. ISBN 9780804758871.

Kim, Nadia Y. (2021). Refusing Death: Immigrant Women and the Fight for Environmental Justice in LA. Stanford University Press. ISBN 9781503628175.

Kim, Nadia Y.; Dhingra, Pawan, eds. (2023). Disciplinary Futures: Sociology in Conversation with American, Ethnic, and Indigenous Studies. New York University Press. doi:10.18574/nyu/9781479819065.001.0001. ISBN 9781479819034.
