= List of comedy and humor awards =

This list of comedy and humor awards provides an index to articles on notable awards for comedy and humor, including writing and performance. The list is organized by the country of the sponsoring organization, although a few of the awards are not restricted to one country.

Country	Award	Medium	Sponsor
Australia	AACTA Award for Best Television Comedy Series	Television	Australian Academy of Cinema and Television Arts
Australia	ARIA Award for Best Comedy Release	Recording	Australian Recording Industry Association
Australia	Brian McCarthy Memorial Moosehead Award	Stage	Melbourne International Comedy Festival
Australia	Helpmann Award for Best Comedy Performer	Stage	Live Performance Australia
Australia	Logie Awards	Television	TV Week
Australia	Melbourne International Comedy Festival Award	Stage	Melbourne International Comedy Festival
Australia	Piece of Wood Award	Stage	Melbourne International Comedy Festival
Australia	Raw Comedy	Stage	Melbourne International Comedy Festival
Australia	Russell Prize	Writing	State Library of New South Wales
Canada	Canadian Comedy Awards	various	Canadian Comedy Awards
Canada	Juno Award for Comedy Album of the Year	Recording	Canadian Academy of Recording Arts and Sciences
Canada	Stephen Leacock Memorial Medal for Humour	Writing	Stephen Leacock Associates
Germany	Deutscher Comedypreis	Television	Köln Comedy Festival
Ghana	Ghana Comedy Awards	Stage	Creative Republic Limited & CoPo Awards Team
India	Kerala Sahitya Akademi Award for Humour	Writing	Kerala Sahitya Akademi
Italy	International Festival of the Humor of Bordighera	Varied	Cesare Perfetto
New Zealand	Billy T Award	Stage	New Zealand Comedy Trust
Nigeria	The Humour Awards	Varied	The Humour Factory
Spain	Gat Perict Perich International Humor Prizes	Cartoons	
United Kingdom	Bollinger Everyman Wodehouse Prize	Writing	Bollinger
United Kingdom	BBC New Comedy Award	Radio	BBC
United Kingdom	Edinburgh Comedy Awards	Stage	Edinburgh Festival Fringe
United Kingdom	Funny Women Awards	Stage	Funny Women
United Kingdom	Leicester Mercury Comedian of the Year	Stage	Leicester Mercury
United Kingdom	Midlands Comedy Awards	Stage	Midlands Comedy Awards
United Kingdom	NATYS: New Acts of the Year Show	Stage	New Variety Lives
United Kingdom	Pride of Manchester Awards	Varied	Pride Of Manchester
United Kingdom	So You Think You're Funny	Stage	Edinburgh Festival Fringe
United Kingdom	Time Out Comedy Awards	Varied	Time Out (magazine)
United Kingdom	British Comedy Awards	Varied	British Comedy Awards
United Kingdom	Chortle Awards	Stage	Chortle
United Kingdom	City Life Comedian of the Year	Stage	City Life (magazine)
United States	American Comedy Awards	Television	NBC
United States	ECNY Awards	Varied	ECNY Awards
United States	Grammy Award for Best Comedy Album	Recording	The Recording Academy
United States	Mark Twain Prize for American Humor	Varied	John F. Kennedy Center for the Performing Arts
United States	NAACP Image Award for Outstanding Comedy Series	Television	NAACP
United States	The Comedy Awards	Television	Comedy Central
United States	Thurber Prize for American Humor	Writing	Thurber House
United States	Comedy Prize	Stage	Prize Foundation

== See also ==
- Lists of awards
