= List of honorary societies =

This is a list of honorary societies to which individuals are elected based on meritorious conduct, by country.

== Brazil ==
- Brazilian Academy of Sciences

== Bulgaria ==
- Bulgarian Academy of Sciences

== China ==
- Chinese Academy of Sciences
- Chinese Academy of Social Sciences
- Chinese Academy of Engineering

== Croatia ==
- Croatian Academy of Sciences and Arts

== France ==
- Institut de France, which groups five academies:
  - Académie française
  - Académie des inscriptions et belles-lettres
  - Académie des sciences
  - Académie des beaux-arts
  - Académie des sciences morales et politiques

== Georgia ==
- Georgian Academy of Sciences

== India ==
- Ibn Sina Academy of Medieval Medicine and Sciences

== Iran ==
- Academy of Gundishapur
- Academy of Persian Language and Literature
- Imperial Iranian Academy of Philosophy
- Iranian Academy of Medical Sciences
- Academy of Sciences of Iran
- Iranian Academy of the Arts
- National Iranian Olympic Academy

== Russia ==
- Russian Academy of Science
- Russian Academy of Arts
- Russian Academy of Theatre Arts
- Russian Academy of Music
- Russian Academy of Architecture and Construction Sciences

== Serbia ==
- Serbian Academy of Sciences and Arts

== Slovenia ==
- Slovenian Academy of Sciences and Arts

== Sweden ==
- Swedish Royal Academies

== Taiwan (Republic of China) ==
- Academia Sinica

== Thailand ==
- The Royal Institute

== United States ==
- American Academy of Arts and Sciences
- American Philosophical Society
- National Academy of Medicine
- National Academy of Sciences
- National Academy of Engineering

== United Kingdom ==
- Royal Society
- British Academy
- Royal Society of Medicine
- Royal Society of Arts

== International academies ==
- World Academy of Art and Science (WAAS)

== See also ==
- Honor society
- Lists of awards
