= Sociological Perspectives =

Sociology journal

- Discipline: Sociology
- Language: English
- Edited by: Black Hawk Hancock, Bryan Sykes (2020-2022)

Publication details
- Former name: Pacific Sociological Review
- History: 1957–present
- Publisher: SAGE for the Pacific Sociological Association (United States)
- Frequency: Bimonthly
- Impact factor: 1.194 (2019)

Standard abbreviations
- ISO 4: Sociol. Perspect.

Indexing
- ISSN: 0731-1214 (print); 1533-8673 (web)
- LCCN: 83643392
- JSTOR: 07311214
- OCLC no.: 8123782

Links
- Online access; Online archive

Sociological Perspectives is the official publication of the Pacific Sociological Association. It is a peer-reviewed academic journal published in six issues each year by SAGE. It was first published in 1957 as The Pacific Sociological Review, with John M. Foskett as founding editor. Since 1983 it is known under its current name.

As of 2022, the editors are Black Hawk Hancock and Bryan L. Sykes. Articles typically address social processes and are related to economic, political, social, and historical issues.

== Abstracting and indexing ==
Sociological Perspectives is abstracted and indexed in the Social Sciences Citation Index. According to the Journal Citation Reports, the journal has a 2021 impact factor of 1.771, ranking it 80th out of 149 journals in the category "Sociology", and a 5-year impact factor of 2.384.
