= List of choreography awards =

This list of choreography awards is an index to articles about notable awards given to choreographers for a song, music video or album.

Country	Award	Sponsor	Period
United States	World Choreography Awards	World Choreography Awards	From 2015
United States	Academy Award for Best Dance Direction	Academy of Motion Picture Arts and Sciences	1935 to 1937
Bangladesh	Bangladesh National Film Award for Best Choreography	President of Bangladesh, Prime Minister of Bangladesh	Since 1992
India	Filmfare Award for Best Choreography	Filmfare magazine	From 1989
India	Filmfare Award for Best Dance Choreographer – South	Filmfare magazine	From 1997
India	IIFA Award for Best Choreography	International Indian Film Academy Awards	From 2000
Bangladesh	Special Award for Best Dancer	Meril Prothom Alo Awards	First given in 2005
United States	MTV Video Music Award for Best Choreography	MTV	From 1984
India	National Film Award for Best Choreography	Directorate of Film Festivals	From 1991
United States	Primetime Emmy Award for Outstanding Choreography	Academy of Television Arts & Sciences	From 1955
United States	Tony Award for Best Choreography	American Theatre Wing	From 1947
India	Zee Cine Award for Best Choreography	Zee : Zee Cine Awards	From 2003

== See also ==
- Lists of awards
