= Charles Tilly Award for Best Book =

American Sociological Association award

The Charles Tilly Award for Best Book is given by the Collective Behavior and Social Movements section of the American Sociological Association in recognition of a significant contribution to the field. Nominees of the award are regarded as being representative of the "best new books in the field of social movements." The award was established in 1986, and is named after sociologist Charles Tilly.

== Recipients ==
- 1988 - John Lofland. Protest: Studies of Collective Behavior and Social Movements.
- 1990 - Doug McAdam. Freedom Summer.
- 1990 - Rick Fantasia. Cultures of Solidarity: Consciousness, Action, & Contemporary American Workers
- 1992 - Sidney Tarrow. Democracy & Disorder: Protest & Politics in Italy, 1965-1975.
- 1994 - Clark McPhail. The Myth of the Madding Crowd.
- 1996 - Charles Tilly. Popular Contention in Great Britain: 1754-1837.
- 1998 - Nicola Kay Beisel. Imperiled Innocents: Anthony Comstock and Family Reproduction in Victorian America. Princeton University Press. 1997. ISBN 9780691027791.
- 2000 - Rebecca Klatch. A Generation Divided.
- 2002 - Jeff Goodwin. No Other Way Out: States and Revolutionary Movements, 1945-1991.
- 2002 - Dingxin Zhao. The Power of Tiananmen: State-Society Relations and the 1989 Beijing Student Movement.
- 2003 - Francesca Polletta. Freedom is an Endless Meeting.
- 2004 - Myra Marx Ferree, William Anthony Gamson, Jürgen Gerhards, and Dieter Rucht. Shaping Abortion Discourse: Democracy and the Public Sphere in Germany and the United States.
- 2005 - Kenneth T. Andrews. Freedom is a Constant Struggle: The Mississippi Civil Rights Movement and Its Legacy.
- 2006 - Gene Burns. The Moral Veto: Framing Contraception, Abortion, and Cultural Pluralism in the United States.
- 2007 - Francesca Polletta. It Was Like a Fever: Storytelling in Protest and Politics.
- 2008 - Roger Karapin. Protest Politics in Germany: Movements on the Left and Right Since the 1960s.
- 2009 - Maren Klawiter. The Biopolitics of Breast Cancer: Changing Cultures of Disease and Activism.
- 2010 - Javier Auyero and Debora Alejandra Swistun. Flammable: Environmental Suffering in an Argentine Shantytown.
- 2010 - Nancy Whittier. The Politics of Child Sexual Abuse: Emotion, Social Movements, and the State.
- 2011 - William Roy. Reds, Whites and Blues: Social Movements, Folk Music, and Race in the United States.
- 2012 - Drew Halfmann. Doctors and Demonstrators: How Political Institutions Shape Abortion Law in the United States, Britain, and Canada.
- 2013 - Kathleen Blee. Democracy in the Making: How Activist Groups Form.
- 2014 - Isaac William Martin. Rich People’s Movements: Grassroots Campaigns to Untax the One Percent.
- 2015 - Katrina Kimport. Queering Marriage.
- 2015 - Edward T. Walker. Grassroots for Hire.
- 2016 - Daniel Schlozman. When Movements Anchor Parties.
- 2017 - Erica Simmons. Meaningful Resistance: Market Reforms and the Roots of Social Protest in Latin America.
- 2018 - Neil Ketchley. Egypt in a Time of Revolution: Contentious Politics and the Arab Spring.
- 2018 - Chris Zepeda-Millan. Latino Mass Mobilization: Immigration, Racialization, and Activism.
- 2019 - Diana Fu. Mobilizing without the Masses: Control and Contention in China.
- 2019 - Tamara Kay and R.L. Evans. Trade Battles: Activism and the Politicization of International Trade Policy.
- 2020 - Jen Schradie. The Revolution That Wasn’t: How Digital Activism Favors Conservatives.
- 2020 - Robert Braun. Protectors of Pluralism: Religious Minorities and the Rescue of Jews in the Low Countries during the Holocaust.
- 2021 - Eleonora Pasotti. Resisting Redevelopment: Protest in Aspiring Global Cities.
- 2022 - Dana M. Moss. The Arab Spring Abroad: Diaspora Activism Against Authoritarian Regimes.

== See also ==
- List of social sciences awards
