= Flammable: Environmental Suffering in an Argentine Shantytown =

2008 book by Javier Auyero and Débora Swistun

- Author: Javier Auyero; Débora Alejandra Swistun
- Original title: Inflamable. Estudio de sufrimiento ambiental
- Subject: Environmental justice, collective action
- Published: 2008
- Publication place: Argentina
- Media type: Print
- Pages: 267 pp.
- ISBN: 9789501245455
- OCLC: 1120425230

Flammable: Environmental Suffering in an Argentine Shantytown is a 2008 book by sociologist Javier Auyero and anthropologist Débora Swistun. Its subject is the impact of pollution and toxicity on the residents of Flammable, a neighborhood on the outskirts of Buenos Aires, Argentina. The book is a contribution to the field of collective action and mobilization regarding environmental suffering. It was first published in Spanish as Inflamable. Estudio de sufrimiento ambiental and translated to English in 2009. It won the Charles Tilly Award for Best Book in 2010.

== Contents ==
Flammable: Environmental Suffering in an Argentine Shantytown examines the effect of pollution and toxicity on the lives of the residents in the neighborhood Flammable (Villa Inflamable) at Dock Sud on the outskirts of Buenos Aires. Flammable is surrounded by one of the largest petrochemical compounds in Argentina and sits on the highly polluted river basin Matanza-Riachuelo that brings the toxic waste from different industries, a hazardous and largely unsupervised waste incinerator, and an unmonitored landfill. Both private and public health agencies diagnosed toxic levels of lead poisoning amongst Flammable's residents, particularly among children, but beyond lead, the soil, air, water and inhabitants of Flammable are contaminated with chromium, benzene, and other chemicals. The book is thus a case of environmental justice, but rather than inquiring about "successful" mobilizations, Auyero and Swistun raise questions about how poor people make sense of and cope with toxic pollution; how they (fail to) understand danger; and, how perceptions and misperceptions are shared within a community. The residents do not act collectively, they do not blame the oil corporations for example, since there is a lack of confidence in their own abilities to engage in such activities. Auyero and Swistun conclude that there is collective disbelief in joint action.

Auyero and Swistun detail the "life amidst hazard, garbage, and poison," which is also the title of the first chapter and depict the slow-motion human and environmental disaster that pollution, dispossession and lack of enforcement of environmental regulations imply in the slum. The focus on the slow aspects of pollution in these settings is comparable to what Rob Nixon has come to call slow violence. A central concept in the book is "toxic uncertainty" that is about how residents doubt or even deny the harmful impact of pollution on their lives, and confusion among the dominated. This is generated by state officials who raise the issue of relocation but then suspend it; by doctors who say the illnesses are no different from those elsewhere, but simultaneously tell patients they must leave the neighborhood; and by lawyers who encourage residents to hold out for a settlement. The whole setting contributes to the confusion and uncertainty. Many of the residents make a living by going through garbage in search of recyclable and saleable material, and this is something actors use against them by claiming that these activities are what causes illness, and the environmental victims are thereby made responsible for their own poor health, as highlighted in a conversation with one of the authors in a newspaper article. This lack of identification of a perpetrator who is responsible for the health problems is distinct from many other socioenvironmental conflicts in Argentina.

The ethnographic research was carried out during 2005 and 2006 and the study is based on several kinds of data. The material includes interviews and informal conversations with residents; interviews with governmental officials, industrial representatives, physicians, and lawyers; and archival documents and media discourses. Furthermore, Débora Swistun lived most of her life in Flammable and thus personally experienced the environmental sufferings and other changes taking place there.

== Reception ==
In a review in Critique of Anthropology, Anja Nygren writes that "despite considerable research on inequality and poverty in Latin America, environmental suffering and the unequal distribution of environmental vulnerabilities have remained relatively marginal research topics in anthropological research on Latin America. The ethnographic analysis by Javier Auyero and Débora Alejandra Swistun on environmental suffering in an Argentine shantytown, ... is a very welcome contribution to the theory and practice of people's experience of daily environmental suffering and its links to social domination."

Flammable won the Charles Tilly Award for Best Book in 2010.
