= List of awards for African Americans =

This is a list of awards dedicated to honoring or recognizing African Americans.

== Awards ==
=== Media and entertainment ===
- Afro-Academic, Cultural, Technological and Scientific Olympics
- BCALA Literary Awards (Black Caucus of the American Library Association Literary Awards). Annual literary award from the American Library Association, Black Caucus, which honors "outstanding works of fiction and nonfiction for adult audiences by African American authors"
- The BET Honors, which celebrates the lives and achievements of African American luminaries.
- Coretta Scott King Award (annual literary award from the American Library Association given to African American authors and illustrators)
- Golden Eagle Award, Afro-American in the Arts
- Black Movie Awards
- Essence Literary Awards (defunct)
- Glyph Comics Awards
- Langston Hughes Medal
- Miss Black America
- Miss Black USA
- NAACP Image Awards (given by the NAACP annually to people of color)
- NAACP Theatre Awards
- Shelia Award (alt. spelling "Sheila Award"), Harriet Tubman African American Museum

=== Other ===
- Spingarn Medal
- William E. Harmon Foundation award for distinguished achievement among Negroes
- Percy L. Julian Award
- Candace Award, National Coalition of 100 Black Women
