= Bundestag Science Prize =

German science award

The Bundestag Science Prize (in German: Wissenschaftspreis des Deutschen Bundestages) is a German science prize. It awards €10,000 every two years for outstanding work about parliamentarism. The prize donor is the German Bundestag.

== Recipients ==
| Year | Recipient | Title of Work |
|---|---|---|
| 2017 | Prof. Dr. Jelena von Achenbach | Democratic Legislation in the European Union. Theory and Practice of the Dual Legitimization Structure of European Sovereignty |
| 2014 | Dr. Benjamin Höhne | Recruitment of Members of the European Parliament. Organization, Actors and Decisions in Parties |
| 2014 | Dr. Tim Neu | The Creation of the State Constitution. Creativity, hypocrisy and representation in Hesse, 1509–1655 |
| 2012 | Friederike Lange | Fundamental Rights of the Legislator |
| 2010 | Dieter Düding | Parliamentarism in North Rhine-Westphalia 1946–1980 |
| 2008 | Dr Nino Galetti | The Bundestag as Client in Berlin: Ideas, Concepts, Decisions on Political Architecture |
| 2006 | Prof. Dr. Bernd Mertens | Legislation in the Age of Codifications: Theory and Practice of Legislative Techniques from a Historical-Comparative Perspective |
| 2003 | Dr Andreas Maurer | Parliamentary democracy in the European Union – The contribution of the European Parliament and the national parliaments |
| 2001 | Dr. Hans-Michael Kloth | From "Zettlefalten" to Free Voting: The Democratization of the GDR in 1989/1990 and the "Electoral Question" |
| 2001 | Dr. Ing. Manfred Schwarzmeier | Parliamentary co-steering structures and processes of informal influence in the German Bundestag |
| 1999 | Dr. Suzanne S. Schüttemeyer | Political Groups in the German Bundestag, Empirical Findings and Theoretical Consequences |
| 1999 | Arnd Uhle | Parlament und Rechtsvordnung |
| 1997 | Dr. Martin Sebaldt | Organized Pluralism, Field of Force, Self-conception and Political Work of the German Interest Groups |
| 1996 | Dr. Frank Brettschneider | Public opinion and politics. An empirical study on the responsiveness of the German Bundestag |
| 1996 | Dr Philippe A. Weber-Panariello | National Parliaments in the European Union: A Comparative Legal Study on the Participation of National Parliaments in National Willingness in European Union Affairs in the United Kingdom France, and the Federal Republic of Germany |
| 1995 | Dr. Wolfgang Demmler | The Member of Parliament of the parliamentary groups |
| 1995 | Dr. med. Patrick Horst | Budget Policy and Government Practice in the US and the Federal Republic of Germany |
