= Ethiopian Human Rights Defenders Center =

Non partisan, nonprofit organization based in Addis Ababa, Ethiopia

- Founded: 2019
- Type: Non-governmental organization
- Purpose: Human rights
- Location: Addis Ababa, Ethiopia
- Region served: Ethiopia

Ethiopian Human Rights Defenders Center (EHRDC) is a non partisan, nonprofit organization founded in 2019, and based in Addis Ababa, Ethiopia, it works to support, and to protect human right defender in Ethiopia from attacks. It was established after 60 human right defenders and organizations met in 2019 at the Claiming Space forum organized by DefendDefenders in Addis Ababa, intending to establish a national human rights defenders network.

== Vision ==
To see the recognized, protected, supported and free from fear Ethiopian Human rights defenders and essential actors in defending and advancing human rights, and bringing about positive change in Ethiopia and be one of the strongest Human rights defend defenders in East Africa.

== Activities ==
Activities of EHRDC include periodic assessments of the situation of Human Rights Defenders in Ethiopia, Capacity-building and training for Human rights defenders on risk, physical/digital security and advocacy, and advocacy for detained human rights defenders.

EHRDC gives a yearly award called Outstanding HRD of the Year which recognizes human rights defender who have played significant roles in promoting human rights in Ethiopia.

== Suspension ==
In December 2024, the Authority for Civil Society Organizations (ACSO), the regulating agency for civil society organizations in Ethiopia suspended Ethiopian Human Rights Defense Center and the Ethiopian Human Rights Council (EHRCO) citing “deviation from their founding objectives by not remaining independent.” This move was criticized by the Ethiopian Human Rights Commission, World Movement for Democracy, World Organisation Against Torture, UN Special Rapporteur on Human Rights Defenders and Amnesty International.

The suspension was lifted on March 3, 2025.
