= Marcus Garvey Prize for Human Rights =

Human rights award

The Marcus Garvey Prize for Human Rights is a ₤5000 award in the name of Jamaican civil rights activist and founder of the Universal Negro Improvement Association and African Communities League (UNIA-ACL), Marcus Garvey, which has been given to distinguished individuals and human rights leaders. The prize was established by the government of Jamaica. The Rev. Dr. Martin Luther King Jr. was posthumously awarded the honor on December 10, 1968, the prize's first recipient.
