= Giuseppe Motta Medal =

Giuseppe Motta Medal is presented annually since 2004 by the Geneva Institute for Democracy and Development to the people from any country or region of the world for exceptional achievement in the promotion of peace and democracy, human rights and sustainable development. The prize commemorates Giuseppe Motta (1871–1940), a Swiss politician, five-time President of the Swiss Confederation, President of the League of Nations Assembly and member of the Swiss Federal Council.

Three medals are awarded annually according to nominations:

- Support for peace and democracy
- Protection of human rights
- Work to achieve sustainable development

== Medal winners ==
Year	Support for peace and democracy	Protection of human rights	Work to achieve sustainable development
2004	Arthur Simon	Elena Bonner	Geoffrey Ballard
2005	Violeta Chamorro	Kim Seong-min (journalist)	Jonathon Porritt
2006	Nelson Mandela	Alirio Uribe Muñoz	Joan Bavaria
2007	Vicente Fox Quesada	Desmond Tutu	James Harris Simons
2008	Václav Havel	Solange Pierre	Junichi Fujino
2009	Martin C.M. Lee	Nadera Shalhoub-Kevorkian	Al Gore
2010	Richard von Weizsäcker	Liu Xiaobo	Charles G. Koch
2011	José Maria Gil-Robles Gil-Delgado	Nasrin Sotoudeh	Ernesto Bertarelli
2012	Soon Ok Lee	Abel Barrera Hernández	Richard Branson
2013	Aung San Suu Kyi	Guillermo Fariñas	Alessandro Carlucci
2014	Angela Merkel	Denis Mukwege	Naomi Klein
2015	Tawakkol Karman	Michel Forst	Jeremy Leggett
2016	Giorgi Margvelashvili	Amina Mohammed	Joan Carling
2017	Kolinda Grabar-Kitarović	Bianca Jagger	Vandana Shiva
2018	David McAllister	Nadia Murad	Christiana Figueres
2019	Zuzana Čaputová	Bryan Stevenson	Greta Thunberg
2020	Sviatlana Tsikhanouskaya	Ai Weiwei	Johan Rockström
2021	Maria Ressa	Marielle Franco	Sandra Steingraber
2022	Volodymyr Zelenskyy	Ales Bialiatski	Kate Raworth
2023	Ellen Johnson Sirleaf	Denis Mukwege	Melinda Gates
2024	María Corina Machado	Volker Türk	Vanessa Nakate
