= Rick Fantasia =

American sociologist

Rick Fantasia is the “Barbara Richmond 1940 Professor in the Social Sciences” and Professor of Sociology Professor at Smith College in the United States and Director of its Kahn Liberal Arts Institute.

He frequently conducts research in France, and his research interests include the interaction between labor and culture in the United States and France. He was particularly influenced by the French sociologist Pierre Bourdieu, and is the former Director of the Louise W. and Edmund J. Kahn Liberal Arts Institute. He received his Ph.D. from the University of Massachusetts Amherst.

== Publications ==
- Cultures of Solidarity. Berkeley: The University of California Press, 1988
- (co authored with Maurice Isserman) Homelessness: A Sourcebook. New York: Facts on File, Inc., 1994)
- (co-editored with Rhonda F. Levine and Scott G. McNall). Bringing Class Back In: Historical and Contemporary Perspectives, Boulder, CO: Westview Press, 1991
- (co-authored with Kim Voss) Hard Work: Remaking the American Labor Movement. Berkeley: The University of California Press, 2004. Published in France as Des Syndicats Domestiqués: Répression patronale et résistance syndicale aux États-Unis. Paris: Editions Raisons d’Agir, 2003.
- French Gastronomy and the Magic of Americanism. Philadelphia: Temple University Press, 2018. French edition forthcoming from Paris: Editions du Seuil, 2021.
