= William Conroy =

William Conroy may refer to:

- Bill Conroy (catcher) (1915–1997), Major League Baseball catcher
- Bill Conroy (infielder) (1899–1970), Major League Baseball infielder
- Will Conroy (born 1982), American basketball player
- William Conroy (murderer) (1857–1887), last person to be hanged at the Perth Gaol
- William Jackson Conroy (1849–1915), miller, farmer and politician in Quebec
