= Ivan Franko International Prize =

- Awarded for: ...honourable acknowledgment of scientific discoveries, significant achievements and considerable efforts of world scientists in the field of Ukrainian Studies and social and humanitarian sciences...
- Country: Ukraine
- Presented by: Ivan Franko International Foundation
- First award: 2015-2017

Ivan Franko International Prize is an honourable acknowledgment of scientific discoveries, significant achievements and considerable efforts of world scientists in the field of Ukrainian Studies and social and humanitarian sciences. The prize is awarded by Ivan Franko International Foundation. The researchers, whose scientific works have been submitted to the Prize Committee and acknowledged to be the best pursuant to the judgement of the International Juries, are awarded with the Prize.

== Traditions ==
The International Prize is awarded annually on the 27th of August, on birthday of Ivan Franko.

Each laureate receives a monetary reward, a golden medal with an image of Ivan Franko and the diploma.

The International Jury, members of which are elected upon the recommendations of the Board of the Fund and the members of the International Experts Council is entrusted to make decisions upon award of the prize.

The first Laureate award ceremony took place on August 27, 2016, on the 160th anniversary of birth of Ivan Franko in Drohobych.

The solemn ceremony is considered to be one of the major cultural events in Ukraine. The Head of the Board and the members of the Board of the Fund, the laureates of the prize, nominees, famous Ukrainian and foreign scientists, public figures are participating in it. The ceremony has been held in two languages and accompanied by the symphony orchestra and chorus.

== The objectives of the prize ==
The prize is established to promote an overall study of creative, scientific and public activity of Ivan Franko and inspire scientists from different countries of the world to carry out urgent researches in the field of social and humanitarian sciences and Ukrainian Studies, which emphasize humanist, national, spiritual, state-creative meaning for perception and establishment of the scientific and cultural heritage of Ukraine in the global context.

== Nominations of the prize ==
The prize is awarded annually on the 27th of August, on birthday of Ivan Yanovych Franko in two nominations:

- for a significant contribution to development of the Ukrainian Studies;
- for a significant contribution to development of the social and humanitarian sciences.

According to the Charter of the Ivan Franko International Fund, academic institutions, higher educational establishments of Ukraine and of the world having diplomatic relationships with Ukraine, as well as prize laureates of the previous years may submit the scientists’ works for the Prize. The same person may be the Laureate of the Prize only once.

== Amount of the International Prize ==
The prize fund is formed on the basis of the contribution payments. The prize fund of 2016 amounts to ₴500,000.

Beside the monetary award, the Laureates are awarded with the diploma and Golden Mark of the Laureate (medal).

== Laureates of the Prize ==
2016

The Archbishop-Emeritus, the former Head of the Ukrainian Greek Catholic Church, Lubomyr Husar with his scientific monograph "Andrii Sheptytsky, the Galician Metropolitan (1901-1944), forerunner of ecumenism" became the first Laureate of the prize.

The International Jury announced the Laureate of Ivan Franko International Prize of 2016 at the Vienna University on August 5, 2016. Blessed Lubomyr Huzar defenced his monograph in English in 1972 at the Pontifical Urbaniana University in Rome. The work was translated and published in Lviv in 2015.

The International Jury granted Ivan Franko Prize in Drohobych on August 27, 2016. Since Lubomyr Huzar could not participate in the ceremony due to reasonable causes, he authorized Archbishop Yaroslav, Bishop of the Ukrainian Greek Catholic Church of Sambir-Drohobych, to accept the award, and read the word of gratitude on his behalf, as well.

Granting of Ivan Franko International Prize took place at the residence of the Blessed Liubomyr on August 30, 2016. The grandson of the Great Kameniar (Bricklayer), Roland Franko personally granted the golden medal, certificate and monetary award to the Laureate.

== See also ==
- List of social sciences awards
