= Enrico Quarantelli =

American sociologist

Enrico L. (Henry) Quarantelli (November 10, 1924 – April 3, 2017) was an American sociologist, and proponent of the sociology of disaster.

== Education ==
Quarantelli received his Ph.D. at the University of Chicago in 1959. From 1963 to 1984 he worked as professor of sociology at the Ohio State University, where he founded the Disaster Research Center (DRC). In 1985 he took the DRC to the University of Delaware, where he worked until 1998.

== Major works and contributions ==
=== Emergencies, Disasters, and Catastrophes Are Different Phenomena ===
Published in 2000 and supported by the Disaster Research Center at Ohio State University, this article discusses the differences between emergencies, disasters and catastrophes as they are differentiated by disaster researchers. The differences between these phenomena should play a role and make a difference in the planning and management activities of crisis groups and an organization’s crisis plans. Disasters differ from everyday emergencies in that they affect unfamiliar and more groups that lose part of their relative independence, whether autonomy or freedom of action. Disasters also call for a change in performance standards to meet the new needs brought about by said disaster. There is also a collapse in the separation of the private and public sectors. Catastrophes, on the other hand, are determined when majority of the community’s built structure is heavily impacted. Typically, the emergency organization’s buildings are affected themselves. Another characteristic is that personnel are unable to return to their normal routines which often extends into the recovery period. Majority of the everyday community functions are interrupted due to extensive damage of the infrastructure and shortages of supplies. The final characteristic of catastrophes is the inability of neighboring communities to offer assistance since they too have been affected. Lastly, this article presents possible implications to better prepare and handle disasters and catastrophes now that there is a known distinction between the phenomena.

=== Technological and Natural Disasters and Ecological Problems: Similarities and Differences in Planning For and Managing Them ===
Published in 1993, these papers focus on answering the following question: for planning and managing purposes to what extent can destructive and damaging situations as are occasioned by natural disasters, civil strife and riots, technological disasters, and ecological problems be viewed as essentially similar phenomena? In order to answer the question, the paper is broken into five major parts. The first part makes a conceptual distinction between natural and technological disasters in terms of being consensus occasions with other crises that are of a conflictive nature. These two types of crises require somewhat different kinds of planning and managing. Due to this, conflict occasions are not further examined. Natural and technological disasters are also distinguished from ecological problems based on their sudden and crisis generating nature. The second section examines how popular thinking affects disaster planning and how some hazard research has tended to conceive of sudden type disasters in agent specific terms. Some examples are hurricanes, chemical explosions, earthquakes, radiation fallout, etc. This paper also questions the value of this approach with its emphasis on physical features of an event. This approach also challenges the distinctions drawn between “Acts of God”/natural disasters, and technological/human created disasters. This paper also suggests that thinking of disasters in general terms rather than agent specific term is more useful. In particular, the value of conceiving of disasters as social phenomena is stressed. The general approach views disasters as social occasions rather than physical happenings and has important implications for the preparing for and managing of such social occurrences. In the final part of the paper, ecological problems are examined. These papers can be found in the Disaster Research Center’s Preliminary Papers.

=== Major Criteria for Judging Disaster Planning and Managing Their Applicability in Development Societies ===
Published in 1998, this paper was prepared as a background paper for the International Seminar on the Quality of Life and Environmental Risks in Rio de Janeiro, Brazil in October 1996. This paper discusses the important factors of preparing for and managing disaster occasions. In order to assess in the preparedness of planning for and the managing of disasters, the paper answers the following question: What is good planning and managing? The answer has been determined from results of the empirical research undertaken by social and behavioral scientists over a 40-year period. Since there are no significant behavioral differences between natural and technological disaster, there will be no distinction in the discussion of preparedness for them. First, the paper discusses the ten general principles of good disaster planning to a great extent as these are the basis for evaluating a plan as good or bad. These evaluations can be made prior to any disaster occurring. This section is followed with the ten general principles of disaster managing since preparedness has a different criterion than management. Good management does not automatically stem from good planning since there is only a partial correlation between the two processes. This paper concludes with noting that majority of the research studies used were done in developed countries rather than developing ones. In order to address these differences, the paper discusses some possible disaster-related differences between the two kinds of social systems. The conclusion states that the 20 principles derived mostly from studies in developed societies are in applicable to developing countries in varying degrees.
