= List of prizes, medals, and awards in Sri Lanka =

This is a list of prizes, medals and awards including cups, trophies, bowls, badges, state decorations etc., awarded in Sri Lanka.

== National honours, military and police medals ==
- Sri Lankan honours system
- Awards and decorations of the military of Sri Lanka
- Awards and decorations of the Sri Lanka Police

== Science, mathematics, technology ==
- National Awards for Science and Technology – National Science Foundation and the Ministry of Science and Technology
- National Science Foundation Research Awards – National Science Foundation

== Computer science, engineering, information technology ==
- National Best Quality Software Awards – British Computer Society Sri Lanka section (BCSSL)
- National Engineering Awards – Institution of Engineers of Sri Lanka (IESL)
- IT Security Awards – ISACA Sri Lanka Chapter
- e-Swabhimani Award – Information and Communication Technology Agency of Sri Lanka (ICTA)National recognition of local content. www.eswabhimani.lk

== Arts and entertainment ==
=== Beauty ===
- Miss Universe Sri Lanka
- Miss World Sri Lanka
- Miss Earth Sri Lanka
- Miss Sri Lanka Online

=== Film ===
- SIGNIS Awards
- Derana Film Awards\
- Sarasaviya Awards

=== Journalism ===
- Sri Lanka journalism awards for excellence

=== Literature ===
- State Literary Awards
- Gratiaen Prize

=== Television ===
- Sumathi Awards
- Raigam Tele'es

== Architecture and construction ==
- Geoffrey Bawa Award – Geoffrey Bawa Trust

== Business and management ==
- National Business Excellence Awards – National Chamber of Commerce of Sri Lanka
- National Productivity Award – National Productivity Secretariat
- SLIM Brand Excellence Awards – Sri Lanka Institute of Marketing
- Effie Award – Sri Lanka Institute of Marketing
- Sri Lanka National Quality Award – National Science Foundation

Achiever of Industrial Excellence Award – Ceylon National Chamber of Industries

== Travel and tourism ==
- Presidential Awards for Travel and Tourism

== Inventions ==
- Presidential Awards for Inventions – Presidential Secretariat

== Sports and games ==
Sri Lankan Schoolboy Cricketer of the Year
