= Dorit Geva =

Sociologist

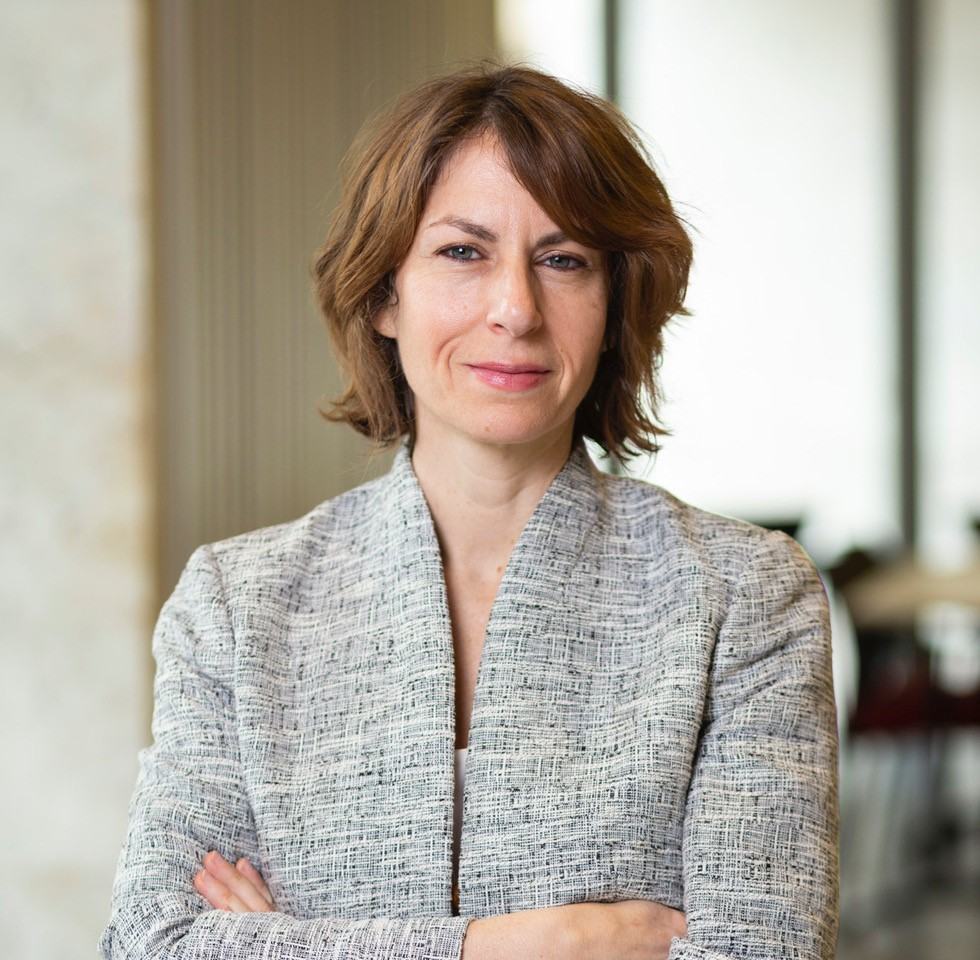
- Occupation: Political sociologist

Academic background
- Education: New York University, PhD, 2006

Academic work
- Discipline: Political Sociology
- Sub-discipline: Social and political theory, politics of gender and sexuality, and comparative and historical sociology

Dorit Geva is a Canadian political sociologist who specialises in political sociology, social and political theory, state theory, neoliberalism, politics of gender and sexuality, and comparative and historical sociology. She is Professor of Politics and Gender at the Institute for Political Science, University of Vienna. Formerly, she was Professor of Sociology and Social Anthropology and was Founding Dean of Undergraduate Studies at Central European University . While at CEU, she was part of a team that created the BA in Culture, Politics and Society. Geva is known for her research on right-wing politics in Europe, and for her research on establishment of the US draft system and its history of racial and gender discrimination. Geva is Chair of Publications Committee of Social Science History Association (SSHA) from 2021.

== Research and career ==
Geva earned her PhD in sociology from New York University in 2006. She held a Vincent Write Fellowship in Comparative Politics at the Robert Schuman Centre for Advanced Studies, European University Institute (2006–2007), Italy, and was then a Harper Schmidt Fellow (2007–2011) at University of Chicago. She had also been a fellow at the Institute for Advanced Studies, Budapest, and at the European Institute for Advanced Studies at Collegium de Lyon.

In 2011, Geva joined the Department of Sociology and Social Anthropology at Central European University (CEU). She was the chair of the department from 2017 to 2019 before being appointed the first dean of undergraduate studies at Central European University in 2019 thanks to her unique vision drawing from experience in American and European education. She was promoted to Full Professor in 2021. From 2024, she became Professor of Politics and Gender at the Institute for Political Science, University of Vienna. She was the MA supervisor of Ahmed Samir Santawy, a CEU student who had been jailed in Egypt.

=== Conscription and family politics ===
Geva's book Conscription, Family, and the Modern State: A Comparative Study of France and the United States was published in 2013. The book examines how fathers were treated by military systems when conscription was institutionalized in France and then the United States. Her work on the United States Selective Service System shows how the draft system was never designed for universal military service, and how men who support families economically have long been deferred from the draft. In later research she has shown how the local draft board system was based on a distinctly American method of “rational informality,” where loose rules from federal guidelines gave local draft board members the power to decide who would be drafted and who would be deferred. The result has been a discriminatory conscription system which has always drafted more African American men because they were not seen as family breadwinners who could benefit from draft deferments. She has also argued that the Selective Service System needs to be disbanded because it was designed to discriminate. Her book has also been translated in German.

=== Far-right politics in Europe ===
Between 2012 and 2016, Geva received a European Commission Marie Curie Career Integration Grant to study political dynasties within political parties. Her work focused on the gender politics of right-wing parties and on transformations in European party politics. This led her to study the French National Front, whose leadership changed from Jean-Marine Le Pen to his daughter, Marine Le Pen. She has written on the difference between, but also the connections between, right-wing ideologies and populist performances, and how they are connected by gendered symbolism, and also on how Marine Le Pen can perform masculine populist repertoires. Her work on new forms of rightwing politics has focused on epistemic politics, including within anti “gender ideology” activism in France. With Felipe Santos, she has written about the rise of right-wing anti-globalists and their influence on establishing far-right educational institutions in Europe.

Her work on how neoliberalism has merged with older forms of far-right politics in Europe has garnered widespread attention. She coined the term “ordonationalist” to capture this development, focusing especially on how Viktor Orbán's Hungary is forging a new type of state and political regime. She also argued that Orban's ideology should be considered as a type of Radicalized Conservatism, different from more populism streams of the far-right, such as Marine Le Pen's National Rally.

== Publications ==
=== Books ===
- Geva, 2013. Conscription, Family, and the Modern State: A Comparative Study of France and the United States. Cambridge University Press.

=== Articles and book chapters ===
- Geva, 2009. "Capifamiglia o coscritti? Origini di genere della coscrizione militare negli Stati Uniti durante la prima guerra mondiale." ("Fathers or Soldiers?: The Gendered Origins of Conscription in First World War United States.") Contemporanea: rivista de storia dell'800 e del '900, 2009, January, pp. 29–52.
- Geva, 2011. “Not Just Maternalism: Marriage and Fatherhood in American Welfare Politics.” Social Politics: International Studies in Gender, State, and Society, Vol. 18, 1, pp. 24–51.
- Geva, 2011. “Where the State Feared to Tread: Conscription and Local Patriarchalism in Modern France.” In The Power of Kinship: Patrimonial States in Global Perspective, edited by Julia Adams and Mounira Charrad. The Annals of the American Academy of Political and Social Science, Vol. 636, 1, pp. 111–128.
- Geva, 2011. “Different and Unequal?: Breadwinning, Dependency Deferments, and the Gendered Origins of the United States Selective Service System.” Armed Forces & Society, Vol. 37, pp. 598–618.
- Geva, 2014. “Of Bellicists and Feminists: French Conscription, Total War, and the Gender Contradictions of the State.” Politics and Society, Vol. 42, 2, pp. 135–165.
- Geva, 2015. “Selective Service, the Gender-Ordered Family, and the Rational Informality of the American State.” American Journal of Sociology, Vol. 121, 1 (July), pp. 171–204.
- Geva, 2015. “Dependency as a Keyword of the American Draft System and Persistence of Male-Only Registration.” Polity, Vol. 47, pp. 199–224.
- Geva, 2017. “Globalizing Gender.” In Social Theory Now, eds Monika Krause, Claudio Benzecry, and Isaac Ariail Reed. Chicago: University of Chicago Press.
- Benjamin Geva and Dorit Geva, 2019. “Non-State Community Virtual Currencies.” In Private Law Implications of Virtual Currencies, Edited by David Fox and Sarah Green. Oxford: Oxford University Press.
- Geva, 2019. “Non Au Gender: Anti-Gender Mobilization and French Conservative Bourgeois Strategies of Distinction.” European Journal of Cultural and Political Sociology. Vol. 6, 4: 393–420. https://doi.org/10.1080/23254823.2019.1660196
- Geva, 2020. “A Double-Headed Hydra: Marine Le Pen’s Charisma, Between Virility and Caritas." NORMA: Nordic Journal for Masculinity Studies Vol 15, 1: 26–42. https://doi.org/10.1080/18902138.2019.1701787
- Geva, 2020. “Daughter, Mother, Captain: Gender, Populism, and the French National Front.” Social Politics: International Studies in Gender, State, and Society. Vol. 27, 1: 1-26. DOI: https://doi.org/10.1093/sp/jxy039.
- Geva and Santos, 2021. “Europe's Far-Right Educational Projects and Their Vision for the International Order.” International Affairs, 97, 5: 1395–1414. https://doi.org/10.1093/ia/iiab112.
- Geva, 2021. “Orbán's Ordonationalism as Post-Neoliberal Hegemony.” Theory, Culture, and Society, April 2021. https://doi.org/10.1177/0263276421999435
- Geva, Dorit. "A new typology of parties of the populist radical right: Fidesz’s radicalized conservatism and gender inequality in comparison to the Rassemblement National." European Journal of Politics and Gender (2024): 1-26.
