= John Foran (sociologist) =

John Foran (born 1955) is an American sociologist with research interests in global climate justice; radical social movements, revolutions, and radical social change; Third World cultural studies; and Latin American and Middle Eastern studies. He has a PhD from the University of California, Berkeley and is a professor of Sociology at the University of California, Santa Barbara.

== Selected publications ==
- On the Edges of Development: Cultural Interventions (coeditor, Routledge, 2009)
- Revolution in the Making of the Modern World: Social Identities, Globalization, and Modernity (coeditor, Routledge, 2008)
- Taking Power: On the Origins of Third World Revolutions (Cambridge University Press, 2005)
- Feminist Futures: Re-imagining Women, Culture and Development (coeditor, Zed Press, 2003);
- The Future of Revolutions: Re-thinking Radical Change in the Age of Globalization (ed., Zed Press, 2003);
- Theorizing Revolutions (ed., Routledge, 1997);
- Fragile Resistance: Social Transformation in Iran From 1500 to the Revolution (Westview Press, 1993).
