= Collective Behavior and Social Movements Section of the ASA =

Section of the American Sociological Association

Collective Behavior and Social Movements (CBSM) is a section of the American Sociological Association (ASA) composed of sociologists who focus on the study of emerging and extra-institutional group phenomena. These include the behaviors associated with crowds, disasters, fads, revolutionary movements, riots, and social movements. The purpose of the section is to foster the study of these topics, which is done so by communicating through its newsletter Critical Mass, organizing research-related participation, and sponsoring workshops.

== History ==
Within the larger ASA, there are constituent parts known as sections. In the 1970s, there was a desire among some members of the ASA to establish a group that would study collective behavior and social movements as a fused topic. Since the ASA section on social psychology had, at the time, just been reorganized, one proposal was to establish a collective behavior-social movement group as a subsection of the newly reconstituted social psychology section. In response to this idea, sociologists Enrico Quarantelli and Jack Weller conducted a survey, whose results indicated that some social movement academics felt that a collective behavior-social movement group would be misplaced as a subsection within social psychology. In order to communicate about this controversy, a newsletter was created: Critical Mass.

The first issue of Critical Mass, published in October 1973, was written by sociologist Thelma McCormack. McCormack suggested that the name “Social Organization” would be appropriate for a new section interested in collective behavior and social movements. However, John Lofland, who was central in the effort to establish an entirely separate section within the ASA for this cause, responded adamantly that the title should pay homage to the traditional link between collective behavior and social movements. The bond between collective behavior and social movements had formed earlier in the twentieth century through the work of Robert Ezra Park and Herbert Blumer. Since then, American sociological tradition had maintained that link. Thus, in 1978, a formal petition was circulated to create a new section, which would be called Collective Behavior and Social Movements (CBSM). CBSM was officially made a section of the ASA in 1980, and is now one of the largest and most active sections of the ASA.

In recent years, the relevance of "CB" (Collective Behavior) in "CBSM" has been questioned. For some, the CB in CBSM has been replaced by CA (Collective Action). This has created the potential for a chasm between the two orientations. Additionally, as the section gains more international attendance, the link between collective behavior and social movements has become more obscure, given that the traditional American sociological link between the two areas is tenuous for non-US academics.

== Critical Mass ==
The newsletter of the CBSM section is Critical Mass. In the areas of physics and chemistry, critical mass refers to the amount of fissile material needed for nuclear fission. Drawing upon this meaning, social movement scholars and activists use the term critical mass in reference to the idea that some threshold of participants or action must be crossed in order for a social movement to burst into existence. Fittingly, the newsletter and its title pre-dated the formation of the CBSM section, which was itself borne out of action and movement.

== Awards ==
The CBSM section of the ASA gives the following awards:

- Charles Tilly Award for Best Book: Established in 1986, this award recognizes a significant published contribution in the field of collective behavior and social movements.
- Mayer Zald Outstanding Graduate Student Paper Award: Established in 1992, this award is given to recognize work done in the field by those who specifically do not have a PhD.
- Best Published Article Award: Established in 2002, this award recognizes articles and chapters from edited books published in the year prior to the award year.
- Exceptional Service Award: As of 2014, this award has been given once, in 2003. The recipient was Hank Johnston, who established and edited Mobilization, an academic journal that is closely tied to the CBSM section.

== See also ==
- Civil resistance
- Counterculture of the 1960s
- Countermovement
- Global citizens movement
- List of social movements
- Nonviolent resistance
- Political movement
- Reform movement
- Revolutionary movement
- Social equality
