= Geneva Institute for Democracy and Development =

Swiss-based research institute

- Type: University
- Established: 2004
- Location: Switzerland
- Website: gidd.eu.org

The Geneva Institute for Democracy and Development (GIDD) is an independent international institute dedicated to research on topics and issues of peace, democracy, human rights, and social and economic problems.

The institute was founded in 2004 in Geneva, Switzerland. Its main goal is to provide data, analysis, and recommendations to policy makers, researchers, the media, and the interested public.

== History and funding ==
The Institute was established in 2004, and works to spread general culture and enhance public education by providing scholarships and publishing publications, research, and analyses. It aims to provide balanced and considered views on topical issues, and to promote open and rational debate based on scientific evidence rather than ideological orientations.

The Institute also seeks financial support from other organizations in order to implement its broad research program and in pursuit of its vision and mission.

== Structure ==
The Institute has of a team of researchers, the organizing committee and the president, numbering approximately 15 people.

== International reach ==
Located in Geneva, Switzerland, GIDD offers a unique platform for researchers from different countries to work in close cooperation. The Institute also hosts guest researchers and interns who work on issues related to the GIDD research programmes. GIDD maintains contacts with other research centres and individual researchers throughout the world.

== Research and communications ==
GIDD’s research agenda is constantly evolving. GIDD’s research has high impact, informing policymakers' understanding and choices, parliamentarians, diplomats, journalists, and experts. Dissemination channels include an active media and communications program with seminars, conferences, a website, a monthly newsletter, and a publications program.

== See also ==
- Geneva International Peace Research Institute
- Maison de la paix
