= Pacific Sociological Association =

- Formation: October 1, 1929; 95 years ago
- Headquarters: Pacific Sociological Association; PO Box 4161; Arcata, CA 95521
- 2017-18 President: Amy Orr
- Executive Director: Lora Bristow
- Website: pacificsoc.org

The Pacific Sociological Association (PSA) is a professional association of sociologists in the Pacific region of North America. The PSA is best known for its annual conference and academic journal Sociological Perspectives.

== History ==
The Pacific Sociological Association was established in October 1929, when Emory S. Bogardus of the University of Southern California called together a group of area sociologists for the purpose of organizing a society. The organization was originally called the Pacific Southwest Sociological Society. In 1930, the new name, Pacific Sociological Association, was adopted. The goal of the charter members was to emerge from the isolation in which they had been at their respective institutions in order to, in union, promote sociological research and teaching. The first annual meeting was held in January 1930 in Los Angeles.

== Regions ==
The Pacific Sociological Association currently encompasses much of the Pacific region of North America. The organization of the PSA is divided into three regions:

- Northern Region: Alaska, Alberta, British Columbia, Idaho, Montana, Oregon, Washington, and Wyoming
- Central Region: California (Fresno and northwards), Colorado, Hawaii, Nevada (excluding Las Vegas), and Utah
- Southern Region: Arizona, Baja California, California (south of Fresno), Nevada (Las Vegas only), New Mexico, Chihuahua, and Sonora

== Leadership ==
The current executive director of the PSA is Jarvez Hall. The presidency of the organization shifts each year at its annual conference. Recent Presidents include: 2014-15 Dr. Patricia A. Gwartney of the University of Oregon, 2015-16 Dr. Robert Nash Parker of UC Riverside, 2016-17 Dr. Karen Pyke of UC Riverside, 2017-18 Dr. Amy Orr of Linfield College, and 2018-19 Dr. Elaine Bell Kaplan of the University of Southern California.

== Periodicals ==
- Sociological Perspectives is an academic journal published bi-monthly by the PSA.
- The Pacific Sociologist is a newsletter issued in January, May, and September by the PSA.

== Awards ==
The Pacific Sociological Association Awards Committee grants 8 annual awards. Nominations for these awards must come from members of the PSA.

- The Distinguished Scholarship Award
- The Dean S. Dorn Distinguished Contributions to Teaching Award
- The Early Career Award for Innovation in Teaching Sociology
- The Distinguished Praxis Award
- The Distinguished Undergraduate Student Paper Award
- The Distinguished Graduate Student Paper Award
- The Distinguished Contribution to Sociological Perspectives Award
- The Social Conscience Award

== See also ==
- American Sociological Association
