= CyberCenturion =

British school cybersecurity competition

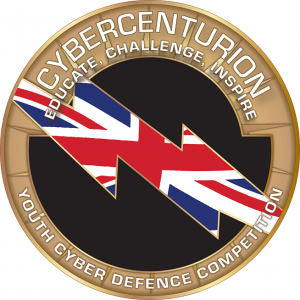
- CyberCenturion logo since 2014
- Sport: Cybersecurity (system hardening)
- First Season: CyberCenturion I (2014-15)
- Last Season: CyberCenturion X (2023-24)
- Sponsor: Northrop Grumman
- Divisions: Junior, Senior
- Countries: United Kingdom and her external territories
- Related Competitions: CyberPatriot (United States), CyberSakura (Japan), CyberTitan (Canada), and others
- Tournament format: Two online (offsite) qualifying rounds, one National Final
- Official website: https://www.stem.org.uk/secondary/enrichment/competitions/cyber-centurion

CyberCenturion was a cyber security competition for secondary school children, run in the United Kingdom by STEM Learning. It mirrored CyberPatriot, the US version run by the Air Force Association. CyberCenturion was sponsored by Northrop Grumman in an initiative to try to build awareness for cyber security among school children. It was discontinued in 2024 after CyberCenturion X.

== History ==
CyberCenturion was set up in 2014 after the success of its US counterpart CyberPatriot and its first final took place at The National Museum of Computing on 17 April 2015. The main aim of CyberCenturion is the same as its US counterpart; to excite, educate and motivate children towards careers in STEM subjects, with an emphasis on cyber security. It is also due to the large deficit in cyber security professionals. Northrop Grumman, the sponsors of both CyberPatriot and CyberCenturion hope that it will inspire youths towards choosing cyber security as a career. Until CyberCenturion VI, CyberCenturion was run by Cyber Security Challenge UK. After the ending of CyberCenturion X, the competition was discontinued by Northrop Grumman and STEM Learning.

== Competition format ==
=== Tracks and categories ===
CyberCenturion was split into two age categories, each with four 'tracks'. This was done to encourage more diversity in the competition. The younger age category was for students in English year groups 7 to 9 (or equivalent) and the older category was for students in English year groups 10 to 13 (or equivalent).

Within the age categories, the tracks split teams into four more groups, with a boys-only track, a girls-only track, a mixed team track and a cadet track.

Places for the final are awarded in the following number of ways:

- "Junior category: one place for the top team of each category (girls, boys, mixed and cadets) and the highest scoring team from all tracks combined"
- "Senior category: two places for the top team of each category (girls, boys, mixed and cadets) and the highest two scoring teams from all tracks combined"

Additionally, a limit of one Junior and one Senior team from any one organisation was placed on finalists.

=== Rounds ===
There are three main rounds with Rounds 1 and 2 being online qualifying rounds where "teams will be provided with a array of Linux virtual machines with the aim to find and fix the vulnerabilities along with answering forensics questions".

Round 3 was the National Finals round, where qualifying teams compete face to face to win the top prize.

Prior to the three main rounds, there are two other 'introductory' rounds where teams play but do not score any points. These are as follows:

- Training Round
- Practice Round

Before CyberCenturion X, there were four rounds, with three qualifying rounds.

=== General rules ===
"The competition was played by teams of between two and four competitors, with up to one reserve who was used in the case of illness, and a responsible adult acting as the liaison between the organisers and the participants, and every team participant must be in English year groups Year 7 - Year 13 (Or equivalent). The competition was open to anyone in Europe that meets the age requirements and has the correct team format (including leader). Each team must play a series of online qualifying rounds, which will challenge them to learn about networking, coding and cyber security. If the team scores higher than most of the other players and makes it to the leaderboard, then they will be invited to play in the National Final, a face-to-face competition which finds the ultimate champion for the year."

- The Qualification Competition starts as soon as the virtual image was booted and ends 4 hours later. (Before CyberCenturion X, the qualifying competition lasted 6 hours). The score was logged regularly and a live scoreboard was released during the competition to competitors. Breaching the time limit will result in penalties.
- Only a single instance of the image may be opened at one time.

== Previous winners and finals ==
In CyberCenturion I, the finals were held in Block H, the original home of Colossus, of The National Museum of Computing in April 2015, with KEGS Young Engineering Club at King Edward VI Grammar School in Chelmsford becoming the first CyberCenturion winners and The Chase School, Malvern being the runners up.

In CyberCenturion II, the finals were held at The National Museum of Computing in April 2016, with "G-Sec" from Bayside Comprehensive School, Gibraltar being first-place winners. The top prize was technology equipment to promote help promote STEM in their school.

In CyberCenturion III, the finals were held at the Institution of Engineering and & Technology in the Maxwell Library in April 2017.

- The team "SPS 'B'" from St Paul's School, London were the first-place winners, winning a selection of prizes; from books for their school, to a unique piece print of a letter from Churchill and lunch with the senior members of Northrop Grumman Corporation and Cyber Security Challenge UK.
- "SPS 'A'", another team from St Paul's School, London, were also the second-place winners.
- Team CyberMen, from King Edward VI Grammar School, Chelmsford, were the third-place winners.

In CyberCenturion IV, the finals were held at the Institution of Engineering & Technology in March 2018.

- "You really can't 'c' me", from St George's School Edgbaston in Birmingham, were the first-place winners, winning the prize of an all-expenses paid trip to the United States.
- Second place winners were "Saved by Bell" from St Paul's School, Barnes
- Third place winners were "Vault 7" from Frome College.
- There were also awards for top all-boys, mixed, all-girls and cadets teams. The all-boys team were from St. George's School Edgbaston, the mixed team were from St. Paul's School, Barnes, the all-girls team were from Bayside Comprehensive School, Gibraltar and the cadet team were from Sandbach School Combined Cadet Force.

CyberCenturion V finals took place in the Plexal Technology Park, London on the 7th March 2019

- Senior division winners were TeamWhy2k, with Now you 'C' me and G-Sec 2.0 placing 2nd and 3rd.
- Junior division winners were "CyberAces", from the Isle of Man Code Club, with Bayside Cyber 1 and LittleMissVirtuals placing 2nd and 3rd.

The CyberCenturion VII finals took place virtually in 2021, due to the ongoing COVID-19 pandemic.

- Senior winners was the team "[sunglass emoji]".
- 2nd place was awarded by the "CyberAces", from the Isle of Man Code Club.
- 3rd place was awarded to "<Error 404 Team Name not Found>", St Georges School Edgebaston.
- Junior Division winners were "SGSE Y9", St Georges School Edgebaston, with Caesar Cypher, from Trinity School Croydon, and Sombody, from Bayside School Gibraltar, placing 2nd and 3rd.

2022 saw CyberCenturion VIII go ahead, wherein the finals took place in the Hendon Royal Air Force Museum.

- "CyberAces", from the Isle of Man Code Club, won 1st place in the senior's division.
- "Bishop Team 3", from Bishop Stopford School, won 1st place in the junior's division.

In 2023, the CyberCenturion IX finals went ahead at the National STEM Learning Centre in the University of York.

- "CyberAces", from the Isle of Man Code Club won again in the senior's division.
- The 1st place in the junior's division went to "I am Root" also from the Isle of Man Code Club.
- 2nd place was won by the team named "Suspicious Impostors" and the 3rd place was won by the team "Maurice Security", from Sutton Grammar School.

In 2024, CyberCenturion X went ahead in HOST, MediaCityUK in Salford.

- "CyberAces", from the Isle of Man Code Club, won 1st place in the senior category for their third time.
- "I am Root", also from the Isle of Man Code Club, won 1st place for the second time in the junior category.

== See also ==
- List of computer science awards
