= University of Advancing Technology =

Private, for-profit university in Tempe, Arizona, US

- Former names: CAD Institute (1983–1997); University of Advancing Computer Technology (1997–2002)
- Motto: Learn. Experience. Innovate.
- Type: Private for-profit university
- Established: 1983; 43 years ago
- Chancellor: Valerie Cimarossa
- President: Karla Aragon-Joyce
- Provost: Dave Bolman
- Administrative staff: ~125
- Undergraduates: ~1000
- Postgraduates: ~100
- Location: 2625 W. Baseline Road, Tempe, Arizona, United States
- Colors: Red, Black, Silver
- Mascot: Wrath the Wyvern
- Website: http://www.UAT.edu

University of Advancing Technology (UAT) is a private for-profit university in Tempe, Arizona. Founded in 1983, UAT offers Associate, Bachelor's and Master's degrees on campus and online in emerging technology fields including Cybersecurity, Artificial Intelligence, Computer Science, Robotics Engineering, Game Development, and Digital Production.

== History ==
Founded in 1983, the University of Advancing Technology was first known as CAD Institute, a small school focused on training engineers and architects in the then new field of computer-aided design. Students came to CAD Institute seeking professional development training and certifications. The institution received accreditation in 1987 by the Accrediting Council for Continuing Education and Training (ACECT) at the diploma and occupational associate's level.

In 1992, CAD Institute founded an initial research center, the Computer Reality Center. The center primarily performed research for the computer graphics industry, with specific emphasis on the field of virtual reality. The institute also shifted to a new accrediting agency, the Accrediting Council for Independent Colleges and Schools (ACICS), which certified it as a college.

In 1996, CAD Institute was accredited as a four-year institution. That same year, the institute began offering educational programs outside the CAD focus. In order to reflect the broadened technology focus of students within the institution, the CAD name was retired in 1997 and the institution was renamed the University of Advancing Computer Technology (UACT).

Associated with a growth in programs and the student body, the institution designed and built a technology-oriented 50,000-square-foot (4,600 m^{2}) campus in 1998 in Tempe, Arizona. The building features classrooms, computer labs and computing commons outfitted with approximately 300 computer workstations and an extensive technology infrastructure. Also in 1998, UACT received approval from ACICS to offer a Master of Science in Technology degree. In 2000, it received approval to offer online courses.

The institution made another incremental change in its name in 2002, when it became the University of Advancing Technology (UAT) to recognize that computer technology had evolved beyond the personal computer to encompass all devices that communicate, manage information, and provide connections through all media, including the Internet. In 2003, UAT offered its first online bachelor's degree in game design.

In the fall of 2007, housing facilities for 260 students were opened on campus. That same year, UAT became a candidate with The Higher Learning Commission and an affiliate of the North Central Association. In recognition of the quality of its Network Security program, the university was also designated a Center of Academic Excellence by the National Centers of Information Assurance Education (CAEIAE) sponsored by the U.S. National Security Agency and the Homeland Security Department.

In 2009, UAT became accredited by The Higher Learning Commission to award associate, bachelor's and master's degrees.

During the 2010s - 2020s, UAT expanded its community engagement through partnerships with schools, non-profit organizations, and community groups focused on technology education and workforce development. The university established programs including technology camps, coding initiatives, and cybersecurity education experiences designed to provide students with exposure to emerging technologies and career pathways in technology fields.

In 2025, UAT partnered with the FBI Phoenix Field Office to host the inaugural FBI Cyber Academy. The weeklong program provided Arizona high school student with hands-on experience in cybersecurity, digital forensics, and cyber investigation through instruction from FBI agents, cybersecurity professionals, and UAT faculty. The academy continued in 2026 for a second consecutive year, expanding UAT's role in cybersecurity education and technology workforce development initiatives.

== Academics ==
UAT offers associate, bachelor's, and master's degree programs. There are 20 different undergraduate majors and 5 areas of study at the graduate level, with a focus on network security, video game design and programming, digital maker and fabrication, robotics engineering, artificial intelligence, and computer science. UAT emphasizes experiential, project-based learning through its Synchronic Learning model, which integrates classroom instruction with collaborative technology projects. Students also participate in interdisciplinary development through the Student Innovation Project, a mandatory, capstone-level working prototype that solves a real-world problem.

=== Accreditations, authorizations, and approvals ===
In 2009, UAT became accredited by the Higher Learning Commission. to award associate degrees, bachelor's degrees and master's degrees.

UAT was designated a Center of Academic Excellence by the National Centers of Information Assurance Education (CAEIAE) sponsored by the U.S. National Security Agency and the Department of Homeland Security.

The Network Security curriculum is certified by the US National Security Agency's Information Assurance Courseware Evaluation program for (NSTISSI-4011), National Training Standard for Information Systems Security (INFOSEC) Professionals, CNSSI-4012, National Information Assurance Training Standard for Senior Systems Managers (SSM, NSTISSI-4013), National Information Assurance Training Standard for System Administrators(SA)(NSTISSI-4014), Information Assurance Training Standard for Information Systems Security Officers(ISSO).

== Campus life ==
UAT has a residential campus in Tempe, Arizona, with approximately 260 bed in Founder's Hall. The residence hall includes a movie room, gym, kitchen, hame room, laundry facilities, and "Think Tanks," isolated room located on each floor that provide students with space for individual study and collaboration. Campus housing also organizes activities and event for residents, cooking events, water splash pads and programs focused on practical life skills.

UAT has technology-oriented student culture, with students often participating activities that reflect their interest in technology, gaming, science fiction, and other related fields. The university's intimate population contributed to a close-knit campus environment in which students from different academic programs frequently interact and form lasting social connections. Students participate in a variety of technology-focused and recreational organizations, including the Nerf Club, Robotics Club, AI Club, Fencing Club, and ESports Club. A student activities council known as Geek Rho meets weekly to plan and discuss campus events and activities. Student programming includes movie nights, tabletop gaming tournaments, Magic: The Gathering tournaments, and Mario Kart competitions.

Student also participate in collegiate competitions and technology event in the Phoenix metropolitan area, including cybersecurity competitions such as the Collegiate Cyber Defense Competition, VEX Robotics, Global Game Jam and National Cyber League (NCL.) In the 2026 Tussle for the Southwest: VEX U Robotics Competition, UAT competed and finished 2nd in match play with a 3-2-1 record and received the Innovation Award for its robot design. During AZTech Week, Arizona's first statewide decentralized tech conference, UAT's Team Nexus won 1st place during the Student Technology Expo at the SMTA Electronics Meets Manufacturing Expo. Team Nexus created an AI-driven application to address some of today's largest challenges around supply chain: material availability, regulatory compliance considerations, counterfeit risk, logistical realities, and supplier performance to drive design decision-making and mitigate risk at earliest stages.

== Technology forums ==
UAT hosted an annual technology forum that features guest speakers from emerging technology fields as well as traditional technology fields such as software engineering and programming. Past speakers have included competitive lockpicker Schuyler Towne, software engineer Chris Pope, video game producer Tamir Nadav, and author/video game producer Steven-Elliot Altman. The forums were later discontinued before being revived in 2025 as part of the university's renewed emphasis on connecting student and the community with technology professional in leading fields.

== Rankings ==
UAT has been included in rankings of colleges and universities in Arizona by several publications and organizations. Recent rankings include:

- #1 Best College for Design in Arizona
- #2 Top Game Design College in Arizona
- #3 Best College for Information Technology in Arizona
- #3 Best College for Engineering Technicians in Arizona
- #3 Best Accredited Online College in Arizona
- #4 Best College in Arizona
- #6 Best College with Robotics and Automation Engineering Technician Degrees in Arizona
- #7 Best College for Computer Science in Arizona
- #10 Best college for Military Technologies
