= CIAS (disambiguation) =

CIAS can refer to

- Canadian International Air Show
- Canadian International AutoShow
- Center for Infrastructure Assurance and Security at the University of Texas at San Antonio
- Changi International Airport Services
- College of Imaging Arts and Sciences at Rochester Institute of Technology
