= UAT =

UAT may refer to:

- Unit auxiliary transformer, step-down transformer supplies voltage to auxiliary loads of power station
- United Africans Transformation, a South African political party
- Correcaminos UAT, a Mexican association football club based in Ciudad Victoria, Tamaulipas
- Universal Access Transceiver, a physical link proposed for the Automatic Dependent Surveillance-Broadcast (ADS-B) aviation technology
- Union Aéromaritime de Transport, a former French airline which became Union de Transports Aériens after merging with Transports Aériens Intercontinentaux in 1963
- United Aircraft and Transport Corporation (UA&T; 1929-1934), a large vertically-integrated U.S. aviation-sector holding company broken up for anti-trust
- University of Advancing Technology, a private for-profit university located in Tempe, Arizona
- University of Alabama, located in Tuscaloosa, Alabama, one of three public universities in the University of Alabama system
- Universidad Autónoma de Tamaulipas, public university in the state of Tamaulipas, Mexico
- User acceptance testing, a process of verifying that a system meets mutually agreed-upon requirements
- Universal approximation theorem
