= Collegiate Cyber Defense Competition =

United States collegiate cybersecurity competition system

- Status: Active
- Genre: Cybersecurity competition
- Frequency: Annual
- Locations: Various (regional); San Antonio, Texas (national)
- Country: United States
- Inaugurated: April 2005
- Founder: Center for Infrastructure Assurance and Security, University of Texas at San Antonio
- Participants: ~2,800 students annually (250+ institutions)
- Organizer: Center for Infrastructure Assurance and Security
- Sponsor: United States Department of Homeland Security; private industry
- Website: nationalccdc.org

The Collegiate Cyber Defense Competition (CCDC) is a tiered cybersecurity competition for full-time undergraduate and graduate students at colleges and universities in the United States. CCDC events emphasize the operational defense of a pre-built business network. Student teams keep services running while defending against live attack and completing business tasks during the competition. The competition season progresses from state-level qualifier events through ten regional competitions to a national championship, the National Collegiate Cyber Defense Competition (NCCDC), held each spring in San Antonio, Texas.

CCDC is sanctioned and operated by the Center for Infrastructure Assurance and Security (CIAS) at the University of Texas at San Antonio, which authored the rule set used by all regional events and directly hosts the national championship. Since the first event in 2005, more than 300 CCDC competitions have been held, with participation from over 250 institutions and an estimated 17,000 students.

In 2010 the United States House of Representatives passed House Resolution 1244 recognizing the CCDC system "for its now five-year effort to promote cyber security curriculum in institutions of higher learning."

== History ==
The CCDC system originated at a meeting held February 27 to 28, 2004 in San Antonio, Texas, where educators, students, and representatives of government and industry convened to discuss the feasibility of recurring cybersecurity exercises for post-secondary students. Following that meeting, the Center for Infrastructure Assurance and Security at UT San Antonio agreed to host an exercise for the United States Southwest. The inaugural Collegiate Cyber Defense Competition took place in April 2005 with five participating institutions and approximately forty students.

Additional regional events were established in subsequent years, and a national championship called the National Collegiate Cyber Defense Competition was created to bring together the winners of each region.

On April 21, 2010, White House cybersecurity coordinator Howard Schmidt attended the fifth annual NCCDC and presented the Alamo Cup to the winning team, describing the event as aligned with the federal National Initiative for Cybersecurity Education. Two months later, on June 29, 2010, the U.S. House of Representatives passed H.Res. 1244 formally recognizing the CCDC for its role in promoting cybersecurity education.

By the 2011–2012 season, approximately 1,300 students from more than 100 institutions were competing through state qualifier and regional rounds, and by the 2018–2019 season participation had grown to 241 institutions and roughly 2,880 students.

== Competition format ==
CCDC events are operational-defense exercises. Student teams take administrative control of a pre-existing simulated business network. They keep its services available while defending against active attack and completing business tasks delivered during the event. A typical event consists of approximately twenty hours of competition spread across two to three days, with eight or more hours of active play per day.

To preserve a level playing field, teams are generally prohibited from bringing outside hardware, software, or unsanctioned network connections onto the competition floor. All defensive work must be performed using resources provided by the organizers.

=== Teams ===
Each CCDC event uses a color-coded team structure:

- Blue Teams are the student teams from competing institutions. Each Blue Team fields up to eight active competitors, no more than two of whom may be graduate students, supported by a faculty or staff coach. Multiple Blue Teams compete simultaneously at each event, each defending an identical copy of the same simulated network.
- The Red Team provides the live external threat and is composed primarily of professional penetration testers drawn from industry and government.
- The White Team operates the automated scoring engine, evaluates inject responses, and arbitrates competition rules.
- The Orange Team (sometimes called the Gold Team) plays the role of business customers and end users, generating service requests and complaints that the Blue Teams must address.

=== Scoring ===
Points are awarded in two roughly equal categories. Service points are earned for keeping required network services, such as web, mail, and DNS servers and an e-commerce site, continuously available, as measured by an automated scoring engine that polls each Blue Team's network at random intervals. Inject points are earned for completing business tasks, called injects, which are issued to teams during the competition. Injects range from short configuration changes to multi-hour projects such as deploying centralized logging, building network monitoring, or migrating user accounts between operating systems. Teams may lose points for service outages, successful Red Team intrusions, and failure to meet inject deadlines.

== Tiered structure ==
The CCDC season is organized as a multi-stage tournament. Most regions hold one or more state-level or invitational qualifier events whose top finishers advance to a regional competition. The winner of each regional event qualifies for the National Collegiate Cyber Defense Competition.

Ten regional competitions feed the national event:

- At-Large CCDC
- Mid-Atlantic CCDC (MACCDC)
- Midwest CCDC
- Northeast CCDC (NECCDC)
- Pacific Rim CCDC (PRCCDC)
- Rocky Mountain CCDC (RMCCDC)
- Southeast CCDC (SECCDC)
- Southwest CCDC (SWCCDC)
- Western Regional CCDC (WRCCDC)
- Wild Card

The national championship is hosted by CIAS in the San Antonio area each spring, where the regional winners compete for the Alamo Cup.

== Eligibility ==
Competitors must be enrolled full-time at an accredited U.S. institution of higher education for the duration of the CCDC season. A student who graduates before their team's first event of the season is no longer eligible to compete that year. Each institution fields a single team per season, drawn from a roster of up to twelve students of whom no more than eight may compete at any single event. The roster is locked once the team competes in its first seasonal event, after which players cannot be added or swapped, although different members of the locked roster may participate in different events. Each team must be supported by a faculty or staff coach from the sponsoring institution.

== Organization and sponsorship ==
CCDC is a project of the Center for Infrastructure Assurance and Security at the University of Texas at San Antonio, which authored and maintains the rule set followed by all regional events and which directly hosts the national championship. Regional competitions are administered by partner institutions and consortia, including the National Cyber Watch Center (Mid-Atlantic), Regis University (Rocky Mountain), and Cyber Florida (Southeast).

The United States Department of Homeland Security has been a sponsor of CCDC since at least 2012, and the Cybersecurity and Infrastructure Security Agency continues to list CCDC among the cybersecurity competitions it sponsors through the National Initiative for Cybersecurity Careers and Studies (NICCS). The competition also receives financial and in-kind support from a range of private-sector cybersecurity firms. Since 2017, Raytheon (a business of RTX Corporation) has served as the national championship's title sponsor, providing technical resources, mentors, and employee volunteers in addition to financial support. Student participation in cybersecurity competitions, including CCDC, is among the engagement criteria considered for the National Security Agency and Department of Homeland Security's National Centers of Academic Excellence in Cyber Defense designation.

== Reception and impact ==
CCDC's operational-defense model has influenced the design of subsequent student exercises. Cybersecurity competitions are a form of active and challenge-based learning that can improve student motivation and skill development, but the high knowledge barrier required to compete may limit accessibility.

The competition has received recurring coverage in the cybersecurity trade press. National-championship results have been reported by Dark Reading, CyberScoop, and SC Media, with more recent national finals also covered by university press. Regional events have likewise drawn coverage from host-institution communications offices. In addition to its educational role, the event functions as a recruiting venue at which sponsors and federal agencies engage directly with competitors.

== See also ==
- National Collegiate Cyber Defense Competition
- CyberPatriot
- Capture the flag (cybersecurity)
- Cyber range
