= Duran Ferree =

American soccer player (born 2006)

Personal information
- Date of birth: September 28, 2006 (age 20)
- Place of birth: San Diego, California, U.S.
- Height: 6 ft 2 in (1.88 m)
- Position: Goalkeeper

Team information
- Current team: San Diego FC
- Number: 18

Youth career
- 2016–2022: San Diego Surf
- Del Norte Nighthawks
- San Diego Loyal Select

Senior career*
Years	Team	Apps	(Gls)
2022–2023	San Diego Loyal	5	(0)
2023–	San Diego FC	4	(0)
2024	→ Orange County SC (loan)	3	(0)
2024–2025	→ Nordsjælland (loan)	0	(0)

International career^{‡}
2023–2024	United States U17	5	(0)
2024	United States U19	1	(0)
2025	United States U20	1	(0)
Medal record
Men's football
Representing United States
CONCACAF U-20 Championship
Runner-up	2023 Mexico
- * Club domestic league appearances and goals as of March 12, 2026 ‡ National team caps and goals as of 01:53, January 1, 2026 (UTC)

Duran Ferree (born September 28, 2006) is an American professional soccer player who plays as a goalkeeper for Major League Soccer club San Diego FC.

== Youth career ==
Ferree began his soccer career in the San Diego Surf youth program, later playing for Del Norte High School.

In April 2021, Ferree joined the developmental program of Loyal Select, attracting attention for his goalkeeping skills. During his time with Loyal Select, Ferree was trained under Matthew Hall, the team's head coach and goalkeeping coach.

Ferree joined Loyal Select in April 2021, and quickly drew the attention of the coaching staff, including Matthew Hall. In his initial season with Loyal Select, Ferree achieved two shutouts and continued this form into the following season. His role at Loyal involved both training and participating in matches while concurrently managing his academic studies through a combination of in-person and online classes.

For his performance in the 2021-22 youth soccer season, Ferree was recognized as the ECNL Boys Southwest Conference U16 Player of the Year and was named to the All-Conference First Team.

== Club career ==
=== San Diego Loyal ===
In September 2022, his performance led to a professional contract with USL Championship club San Diego Loyal, becoming the first player from the Loyal Select program to do so. He made his debut on October 9, 2022. At San Diego Loyal, he was coached by Landon Donovan. Ferree became the youngest goalkeeper to record a shutout in the USL Championship's history. During his two seasons with San Diego Loyal, Ferree appeared in five games. Notably, he was the starting goalkeeper in the team's 2nd round victory against Albion San Diego in the U.S. Open Cup on February 23.

=== San Diego FC ===
In December 2023, Ferree was signed by Major League Soccer club San Diego FC, becoming the inaugural signed player in the team's history. On January 25, 2024, it was announced that Ferree would join USL Championship side Orange County SC on a loan deal for the 2024 season. In October 2024, he was recalled from Orange County SC and moved to Danish Superliga team Nordsjælland for the rest of the 2024 season.

On November 29, 2025, Ferree made his league debut in the 80th-minute of the 2025 Western Conference final. On February 21, 2026, Ferree made his first Major League Soccer start for San Diego FC in the club’s season opener, a 5–0 victory over CF Montréal at Snapdragon Stadium. In the match, he recorded two saves and earned his first MLS clean sheet.

== International career ==
In February 2023, Ferree was a part of the U17 team that reached the final of the Concacaf U-17 Championship, where they were defeated by Mexico with a score of 3–1 on February 26. In 2023, Ferree also played for the United States in the FIFA U-17 World Cup, contributing to the team's advancement to the round of 16. He made five appearances for the United States, achieving two clean sheets during the qualifying rounds and the competition itself.

In 2024, Ferree represented the United States at the CONCACAF Under-20 Championship. He was also named to the U19 squad to face both Sweden and Japan in friendly matches in Valencia, Spain, on October 11 and 15 respectively. In 2025, Ferree was named to the U20 squad for the 2025 FIFA U-20 World Cup in Chile.
