= Quenton Meeks =

American football player (born 1996)

Profile
- Position: Cornerback

Personal information
- Born: June 20, 1997 (age 29); San Diego, California, U.S.
- Listed height: 6 ft 1 in (1.85 m)
- Listed weight: 209 lb (95 kg)

Career information
- High school: Del Norte (San Diego)
- College: Stanford
- NFL draft: 2018: undrafted

Career history
- Jacksonville Jaguars (2018); Los Angeles Chargers (2019–2020); Jacksonville Jaguars (2020); Tennessee Titans (2021)*; Tampa Bay Bandits (2022); New Orleans Saints (2022)*; St. Louis BattleHawks (2023)*; Memphis Showboats (2023–2024); Montreal Alouettes (2025)*; Ottawa Redblacks (2026)*
- * Offseason or practice squad member only

Awards and highlights
- Second-team All-Pac-12 (2017)

Career NFL statistics
- Total tackles: 8
- Pass deflections: 2
- Stats at Pro Football Reference

Quenton Meeks (born June 20, 1997) is an American professional football cornerback. He played college football at Stanford.

== Early life ==
Meeks attended Del Norte High School in San Diego, California. He committed to Stanford University to play college football.

== College career ==
Meeks played at Stanford from 2015 to 2017. After his junior season in 2017, he decided to forgo his senior year and enter the 2018 NFL draft. During his career he had 115 tackles, seven interceptions and two touchdowns.

== Professional career ==
Pre-draft measurables
Height	Weight	Arm length	Hand span	40-yard dash	10-yard split	20-yard split	20-yard shuttle	Three-cone drill	Vertical jump	Broad jump	Bench press
6 ft 1 in (1.85 m)	209 lb (95 kg)	31 3/4 in (0.81 m)	10 1/4 in (0.26 m)	4.54 s	1.53 s	2.65 s	4.23 s	6.72 s	39.0 in (0.99 m)	10 ft 8 in (3.25 m)	11 reps
All values from NFL Combine/Pro Day

=== Jacksonville Jaguars (first stint) ===
Meeks signed with the Jacksonville Jaguars as an undrafted free agent on April 30, 2018. He was waived on September 1, 2018 and was signed to the practice squad the next day. He was promoted to the active roster on October 6, 2018.

On August 31, 2019, Meeks was waived by the Jaguars.

=== Los Angeles Chargers ===
On October 1, 2019, Meeks was signed to the Los Angeles Chargers practice squad. He signed a futures contract with the Chargers on December 30, 2019. He was placed on the active/non-football illness list to start training camp on August 3, 2020, and was activated from the list the next day. He was waived on September 5, 2020 and signed to the practice squad the next day. He was elevated to the active roster on November 7 and November 14 for the team's weeks 9 and 10 games against the Las Vegas Raiders and Miami Dolphins, and reverted to the practice squad after each game. He was released on November 26, 2020.

=== Jacksonville Jaguars (second stint) ===
On December 7, 2020, Meeks signed with the practice squad of the Jacksonville Jaguars. He was elevated to the active roster on December 12 and December 19 for the team's weeks 14 and 15 game against the Tennessee Titans and Baltimore Ravens, and reverted to the practice squad after each game. On December 26, 2020, Meeks was promoted to the active roster. He was waived on March 17, 2021.

=== Tennessee Titans ===
Meeks signed with the Tennessee Titans on May 11, 2021. He was waived on July 31, 2021.

=== Tampa Bay Bandits ===
On March 10, 2022, Meeks was drafted in the USFL supplemental draft by the Tampa Bay Bandits.

=== New Orleans Saints ===
On August 6, 2022, Meeks signed with the New Orleans Saints. He was waived on August 28.

=== St. Louis BattleHawks ===
On November 17, 2022, Meeks was drafted by the St. Louis BattleHawks of the XFL.

=== Memphis Showboats ===
Meeks signed with the Memphis Showboats of the United States Football League (USFL) on April 11, 2023.

=== Montreal Alouettes ===
Meeks signed with the Montreal Alouettes of the Canadian Football League on March 19, 2025. He was released on May 14, 2025.

=== Ottawa Redblacks ===
On April 20, 2026, Meeks signed with the Ottawa Redblacks of the Canadian Football League (CFL). He was released on May 9.

== Personal life ==
His father is longtime NFL coach Ron Meeks, who grew up in Jacksonville. Ron attended Robert E. Lee High School.
