= Mason Abbiate =

American soccer player (born 1998)

Personal information
- Nationality: American
- Born: June 24, 1998 (age 27) California, United States
- Education: Del Norte High School
- Height: 1.65 m (5 ft 5 in)
- Weight: 61 kg (134 lb)

Sport
- Sport: Soccer / Cerebral palsy soccer
- Updated on 18 June 2016

Mason Abbiate (born June 24, 1998) is an American Paralympic soccer player. Abbiate has cerebral palsy, and plays both CP football and able-bodied football. On the able-bodied side, he played for the San Diego Soccer Club and varsity high school soccer for Del Norte High School.

In January 2015, Abbiate had his first call up to the US Paralympic National Team. Later that year, he was with the team at the 2015 Cerebral Palsy Football World Championships and the 2015 Parapan American Games. He was involved with a number of other training camps and tournaments in the lead up to the 2016 Summer Paralympics.

== Personal ==
Abbiate was born on June 24, 1998 and is from San Diego, California. Born four months premature, he weighed only two pounds. He has a mild form of cerebral palsy that impacts the right side of his body. When he was a baby, doctors cautioned his parents that he may never be able to walk. He attended Del Norte High School.

Abbiate is 165 cm tall and weighs 61 kilograms.

== Soccer ==
Abbiate started playing soccer when he was 6 years old against other players without disabilities. He played for the San Diego Soccer Club for various age level teams. He also played varsity high school soccer for Del Norte High School.

== Cerebral palsy football ==
Abbiate is a CP7 classified footballer who plays in the midfield.

Abbiate was selected for the national team after San Diego Soccer Club Director Brian Quinn connected him with the right people. In January 2015, he was invited along with seven other youth players from around the country between the ages 14–19 to participate in a national team development camp at the Chula Vista Olympic Training Center. Of the players participating in the camp, he was the only one to earn a call up to the national team squad. He was invited to a national team training camp that took place from April 29 to May 6, 2015, in Carson, California. This camp was in preparation for the 2015 Cerebral Palsy Football World Championships in June of that year in England.

Abbiate went with the team to participate in a tournament in Portugal in early 2015. In March 2015, he was part of the 14 man roster that participated in the Povoa de Varzim, Portugal hosted Footie 7 – Povoa 2015 tournament. The competition was a warmup for the World Championships that were held in England in June 2015. He was on the roster for the 2015 World Championships. The United States finished seventh at the tournament. He was a starter in the team's 10 - 0 loss to England. He sat on the bench in the United States's 2 - 1 win against Scotland. It was his first World Championships as a member of the national team.

Abbiate was part of the 14 man squad that represented the United States at the 2015 Parapan American Games in Toronto. There, the United States played Canada, Venezuela, Argentina and Brazil. He played in the United States' 0 - 6 loss to Brazil at the Parapan Games. The national team finished the competition with an 0 - 3 - 1 record.

Going into national team preparations for the Rio Games, Abbiate was the youngest member of the US squad. He took part in a national team training camp in Chula Vista, California in early March 2016. In April 2016, he took part in a national team training camp in Bradenton, Florida in preparation for the May 2016 Pre Paralympic Tournament. He was part of the United States Paralympic National Team that took part in the 2016 Pre Paralympic Tournament in Salou, Spain. The United States finished 6th after beating Argentina in one placement match 4 - 3 and losing to Ireland 4 - 1. The goals scored in the match against Argentina were the first the USA scored in the tournament, before putting up one more in their match against Ireland. The tournament featured 7 of the 8 teams participating in Rio. It was the last major preparation event ahead of the Rio Games for all teams participating.
