= Cyber Security Challenge UK =

Former UK cybersecurity skills competition and training organisation

- Formation: 25 March 2010
- Dissolved: 14 October 2025
- Type: Not-for-profit company limited by guarantee
- Purpose: Cybersecurity education, competitions and skills development
- Location: United Kingdom
- Region served: United Kingdom
- Key people: Stephanie Daman, Nigel Harrison
- Affiliations: Cabinet Office, GCHQ, National Crime Agency, Bank of England
- Funding: Financial support through the UK National Cyber Security Programme; sponsors from government, business and academia
- Website: Archived official website

Cyber Security Challenge UK was a British not-for-profit organisation that ran cyber security competitions and educational programmes intended to identify and encourage people with aptitude for cyber security careers. The organisation was incorporated as Cyber Security Challenge UK Limited on 25 March 2010 and was dissolved on 14 October 2025.

The Challenge was supported by government, industry and academic organisations, and formed part of wider UK efforts to address cyber security skills shortages. In 2015, the UK government described it as a programme of virtual and face-to-face competitions designed to identify talented people for the cyber security industry.

The organisation closed at the end of March 2025 after approximately fifteen years of activity.

== History ==
Cyber Security Challenge UK was established in 2010 to help address a shortage of cyber security professionals in the United Kingdom. Its early work focused on competitions for people outside the established cyber security profession, with the aim of identifying aptitude that might otherwise be missed by conventional recruitment routes.

The first Cyber Security Challenge UK final was held in 2011. Dan Summers, a postman from Wakefield, was named the first UK Cyber Security Champion after a final in Bristol. In 2012, Cambridge computer science student Jonathan Millican won the competition. In 2013, Stephen Miller, a chemist from Hertfordshire, was named UK Cyber Security Champion after progressing through online and face-to-face rounds.

By the mid-2010s, the Challenge had expanded into a year-round programme of online competitions, face-to-face events (known as F2F), school programmes and a flagship Masterclass final. Government and press sources described the organisation as part of wider efforts to address cyber security skills shortages in the United Kingdom.

== Competitions ==
Cyber Security Challenge UK ran online and face-to-face competitions designed to test practical cyber security skills. Its flagship competition was the Cyber Security Challenge UK Masterclass, in which finalists were placed in simulated cyber incidents and assessed by representatives from industry and government.

=== 2011 final ===
The first Cyber Security Challenge UK final was held in Bristol in March 2011. Dan Summers, a postman from Wakefield, was named the first UK Cyber Security Champion.

=== 2012 final ===
In 2012, Jonathan Millican, a computer science student at the University of Cambridge, won the UK Cyber Security Challenge.

=== 2013 final ===
In 2013, Stephen Miller, a chemist from Hertfordshire, was named UK Cyber Security Champion. Miller had progressed through online and face-to-face competitions before winning the final.

=== 2014 Masterclass ===
From this year onwards, the final round of the competition was called a "Masterclass" with competitors drawn from the top 42 ranking players in the previous rounds.

The 2014 Masterclass was supported by organisations including BT Group, Juniper, GCHQ, the National Crime Agency, Lockheed Martin and the Bank of England. The competition used a scenario involving a simulated cyber attack on the UK financial system.

The 2014 Masterclass was won by Will Shackleton, a University of Cambridge student, who beat more than 3,000 entrants and the 41 other finalists.

=== 2015 HMS Belfast Masterclass ===
In March 2015, the Masterclass final was held aboard HMS Belfast in London. The event involved a two-day cyber-war simulation designed by a group of cyber security experts led by BT. The fictional scenario required contestants to regain control of the ship's gun systems after they had been taken over by a cyber-terrorist group and pointed at City Hall.

The exercise was designed to test incident response, network defense and teamwork in a realistic operational setting. The competition was won by Adam Tonks, a computer science student.

=== 2015 Church House Masterclass ===
In November 2015, a second Masterclass final following another competition that year was held Church House, Westminster, near Westminster Abbey and the Houses of Parliament. The exercise used a fictional bioterrorism scenario. The scenario focused on a chemical company, ZSB Formulas, which had been breached by a terrorist group called Black Oleander. Contestants discovered a plan to release an airborne virus through an air-conditioning system during an international summit attended by members of the Royal Family, senior government officials and foreign dignitaries.

Press reports emphasised the realism of the Church House exercise, including actors in biohazard suits and scouting robots entering the conference hall while the 42 contestants worked to prevent the simulated attack.

The Church House event was also reported as a talent-identification exercise with recruiters and assessors from organisations including GCHQ, QinetiQ, BT group, Bank of England and the National Crime Agency tracking participants' progress during the simulation.

The event also took place during public debate over the Draft Investigatory Powers Bill, which had been introduced by Home Secretary Theresa May earlier in November 2015. The draft bill proposed to consolidate and expand the legal framework for interception, communications data, equipment interference and bulk powers, including requirements for internet service providers to retain internet connection records for 12 months. Contestants had to consider whether actions such as intercepting communications or accessing compromised systems would require legal authorisation, connecting the fictional exercise to contemporary debates about surveillance powers and cyber operations.

=== 2016 Masterclass ===
The 2016 Masterclass was held in Shoreditch, east London. The scenario required competitors to defend a fictional energy company from live cyber attacks, repair a data breach and investigate the loss of £125 million.

The challenge was created by PwC and supported by GCHQ, the National Crime Agency and the Bank of England. It was won by Ben Jackson, an 18-year-old A-level student, the youngest overall winner in the Challenge's history.

=== 2017 Masterclass ===
The 2017 Masterclass was held at Trinity House in London and used a scenario based on a cyber attack against a fictional shipping company. Contestants investigated a breach, defended against live attacks and built a courtroom case against a fictional corrupt chief operating officer.

Mo Rahman, a 22-year-old computer science student, was named Champion.

=== 2018 Masterclass ===
The 2018 Masterclass final used a cryptocurrency-themed scenario known as "Cryptofactor". The competition was supported by Barclays and involved finalists competing over three days.

Charlie Hosier, a 19-year-old student at Edinburgh Napier University, was named the 2018 Cyber Security Challenge UK Champion.

== Schools and education ==
Cyber Security Challenge UK developed programmes for schools and younger learners as part of its wider skills mission. The programmes included teaching packs, touch-screen games, infographics and paper-based exercises to raise awareness of cyber security careers and develop practical skills.

In 2017, SANS Institute, BT group, FutureLearn and Cyber Security Challenge UK were confirmed as delivery partners for the "Cyber Schools Programme", an extracurricular scheme for 14- to 18-year-olds intended to develop skills relevant to work in the cyber security sector. The government said students would be selected through a pre-entry assessment and given pathways into the industry through contact with industry experts. The programme formed part of the wider National Cyber Security Programme and the 2016–2021 National Cyber Security Strategy, which included measures such as CyberFirst bursaries, CyberFirst Girls, cyber apprenticeships and retraining schemes.

== European activity ==
Cyber Security Challenge UK was involved in the United Kingdom's participation in the European Cybersecurity Challenge. In 2017, ten UK participants represented Britain at the European Cyber Security Challenge in Málaga. The team was led by members of Cyber Security Challenge UK and coached by BAE Systems.

The UK hosted the European Cyber Security Challenge in 2018. The event involved teams of under-25s from 18 countries in a Capture the flag (cybersecurity) style competition.

== Closure and legacy ==
Cyber Security Challenge UK closed at the end of March 2025 after around fifteen years, formally dissolving in October 2025.

Following the closure, charity The Cyber Trust stated that much of the Challenge's content, including CybergamesUK, CyberLand and teaching and lesson plans, had been donated to them and would remain available through The Cyber Trust and CybergamesUK.

== See also ==
- CyberFirst
- European Cybersecurity Challenge
- National Cyber Security Centre (United Kingdom)
- National Crime Agency
- Security hacker
- Capture the flag (cybersecurity)
