= Center for Infrastructure Assurance and Security =

- Formation: 2001
- Type: Non-Profit Organization
- Location: San Antonio Texas United States
- Parent organization: The University of Texas at San Antonio
- Website: / cias.utsa.edu]

The Center for Infrastructure Assurance and Security (CIAS) was established at The University of Texas at San Antonio (UTSA) in 2001 as part of UTSA's creation of a cyber security program. The CIAS conducts activities in two major areas: Infrastructure Assurance Programs and Training and also Cyber Security Defense Competitions. The Community Cyber Security Maturity Model (CCSMM), developed by the CIAS, serves as the roadmap for many of its activities. CIAS efforts have been conducted through grants from the U.S. Department of Defense, Department of Homeland Security and through private partnerships. Largely as a result of early CIAS activities, UTSA was the first university in Texas to receive designation as a Center of Academic Excellence in Information Assurance Education by the National Security Agency. Texas currently has the most universities of any state in the country with these designations. The Center created and currently directs the National Collegiate Cyber Defense Competition and is a Founding Partner of the CyberPatriot National High School Cyber Defense Competition. President Obama's May 2009 Cyberspace Policy Review specifically mentions the CIAS's National Collegiate Cyber Defense Competition (NCCDC) as an example of key education programs that can ensure the Nation's continued ability to compete in the information age economy.
