= CyberFirst =

2020 advertisement by the UK Government and CyberFirst

CyberFirst is a programme led by the National Cyber Security Centre to encourage young people to go into cyber security careers. The programme collaborated with the Government of the United Kingdom to run a "Rethink Reskill Reboot" campaign. The campaign is notorious for a 2020 advertisement Fatima's next job could be in cyber. (she just doesn’t know it yet). The advert depicts a ballet dancer named Fatima and suggests that she should retrain to become a cyber security worker. Despite being part of the wider campaign involving adverts depicting multiple other workers such as barbers moving to tech work that had started in 2019, it received criticism from artists and politicians in October 2020 during the COVID-19 pandemic for being "patronising" and harmful towards the arts. It was subsequently taken down due to the backlash.

== Fatima's next job could be in cyber ==
Fatima's next job could be in cyber. (she just doesn’t know it yet) was released in the context of the COVID-19 pandemic, which had caused businesses to scale back and cut jobs. This included many music venues and cultural organisations. As a result, thousands of jobs were being lost in the culture sector. Unemployment was at its highest level in two years, youth unemployment was on a trajectory to triple, and new lockdown measures risked further job losses. Then-Chancellor of the Exchequer Rishi Sunak had said the previous week that workers needed to adapt to the changing reality.

Campaigns such as this one were not new, as tech training organisation QA, which would post the advert on its website, had been administering vocational courses under the CyberFirst name since 2017 in collaboration with the National Cyber Security Centre and occasionally alongside companies like BAE Systems.

=== Creation ===
The image of the ballet dancer originates from a photograph by Atlanta photographer Krys Alex of Desire'e Kelley and Tasha Williams, with Kelley being the dancer retained in the advert itself. It had been uploaded to Unsplash, where pictures can be downloaded for free for commercial and non-commercial purposes. It depicts Kelley tying her ballet shoes.

The campaign itself, which ran from April 2019 to March 2020, was led by QA and promised to impart people "with the essential cyber skills needed to set [them] on a rewarding career path". The advert initially featured on the QA website, as part of a series of such advertisements featuring other workers including a barber, a shop worker and a barista, encouraging all of these professionals to switch to jobs in tech. The NCSC was not directly involved.

=== Reception and removal ===
After it was shared by theatre casting director Anne Vosser on 11 October 2020, reactions to the campaign grew quickly on social media the next day. The advertisement was reposted by those critical of the Conservative government, prompting users to call the advert "patronising". Some social media captions read; "Just look at this soul-crushing Tory propaganda against culture and the arts", and "Our government really doesn't value the arts." While BBC News say the ballet dancer picture was quickly replaced by a picture of a baker following the backlash, The Daily Telegraph states that it was replaced with another of a barista named "Justin". The web page was later removed altogether, though is retained in internet archives.

Memes also circulated which parodied the advert, replacing "Fatima" with other figures and jobs. These included "Priti’s next job could be volunteering in Calais," and "Dom’s next job could be in the prison laundry," referring to Priti Patel and Dominic Cummings respectively, while another read "Fatima could keep the job she loves (if the government decided to give a fuck)"

Writer Caitlin Moran tweeted that "I don't know if the government know they appear to have recently created a 'Hopes & Dreams Crushing Department', but for a country already depressed and anxious, I would suggest it's a bit of a 'Not now, dudes' moment?" Choreographer Sir Matthew Bourne said that the advert "has to be a joke? Right?" Musician Fatboy Slim said the advert was "throwing the arts under the bus." Other critics said the campaign represented "cultural philistinism and bad governance in one ad". Singer Sam Fender said he thought the advert was "satire". Savage Garden singer Darren Hayes said that "Making joy is our job. Reboot your terrible advertisement". A Glamour article by Josh Smith called the advert "offensive to women everywhere". Dr Rosena Allin-Khan, Shadow mental health minister, tweeted; "Fatima, you be you. Don't let anyone else tell you that you aren't good enough because you don't conform to their preconceived social norms."

A Reuters fact check said that these criticisms were missing context as "the advert comes from a series that features workers from a variety of industries, not just the arts."

A spokesperson for the UK government said that the advert was "not appropriate", and that it had been taken down; this included the program page featuring the ad on the QA website. Culture secretary Oliver Dowden distanced himself from the campaign the same day, calling it "crass" and clarifying it was not created by the Department for Digital, Culture, Media, and Sport (DCMS). He stated that it "was a partner campaign encouraging people from all walks of life to think about a career in cyber security. I want to save jobs in the arts, which is why we are investing £1.57 billion." The same day that the advert had received attention, DCMS had released details of 1,300 organisations that would share £257m in funding from its previously announced £1.57bn arts support package.

On 15 October Krys Alex, the photographer, said she was not aware of the use of the photograph until it began to be criticised on social media, describing that she "felt devastated," and would have never agreed to its use in the advert. She called Kelley "a young, talented, and beautiful aspiring dancer from Atlanta."
