= Schuyler Towne =

M. Schuyler Towne
- Born: 1983 (age 42–43); Burlington, Vermont
- Known for: Lockpicking

M. Schuyler Towne (born 1983) is a lock picking expert who contributed to the locksport movement in the United States. He was introduced to lockpicking at the Hackers on Planet Earth conference in New York in 2006. Towne was one of the founding board members of the United States chapter of the Open Organisation of Lockpickers. In 2007 he launched Non-Destructive Entry Magazine. Towne competed in the Dutch Open at LockCon in the Netherlands and at DEF CON in Las Vegas. He has also taught lockpicking workshops and studied the history of locks.

In 2010, Towne created a project called "Open Locksport" on the crowd funding website Kickstarter, with a goal of producing custom lock picks, practice locks, and other rewards for backers. The project aimed to raise US$6,000, and upon its completion, it had raised US$87,407, which vastly exceeded his expectations. He ran into substantial difficulties with managing the project, and a small group of volunteers helped Towne ship as many as possible of the promised rewards to backers.
