= Air & Space Forces Association =

American professional military association founded 1946

- Formation: February 4, 1946; 80 years ago
- Founder: Jimmy Doolittle, et al.
- Founded at: District of Columbia
- Type: 501(c)(3) nonprofit organization
- Purpose: Air and space power education; Air and Space Forces advocacy; Airman, Guardian, and family support
- Headquarters: Arlington, Virginia
- Chairman of the Board: Kathleen Ferguson
- President: Burt Field
- Website: www.afa.org

The Air & Space Forces Association (AFA) is an independent, 501(c)(3) non-profit, professional military association for the United States Air Force and United States Space Force. Headquartered in Arlington, Virginia, its declared mission is "to educate the public about air and space power, to advocate for the world's most capable, most lethal, and most effective Air and Space Forces, and to support Airmen, Guardians, and their families."

AFA publishes Air & Space Forces (retitled from Air Force Magazine in September 2022) and the Daily Report. It also runs the Mitchell Institute for Aerospace Studies and conducts social networking, public outreach, and national conferences and symposia. It sponsors professional development seminars and has an awards program. AFA has a scholarship program for Air Force active duty, Air National Guard, and Air Force Reserve members and their dependents. It also provides grants to promote science and math education at the elementary and secondary school level.

Founded in 1946 as the Air Force Association, the organization renamed itself in April 2022. It continued to use the abbreviation AFA.

== History ==
=== Advocating for air force independence ===
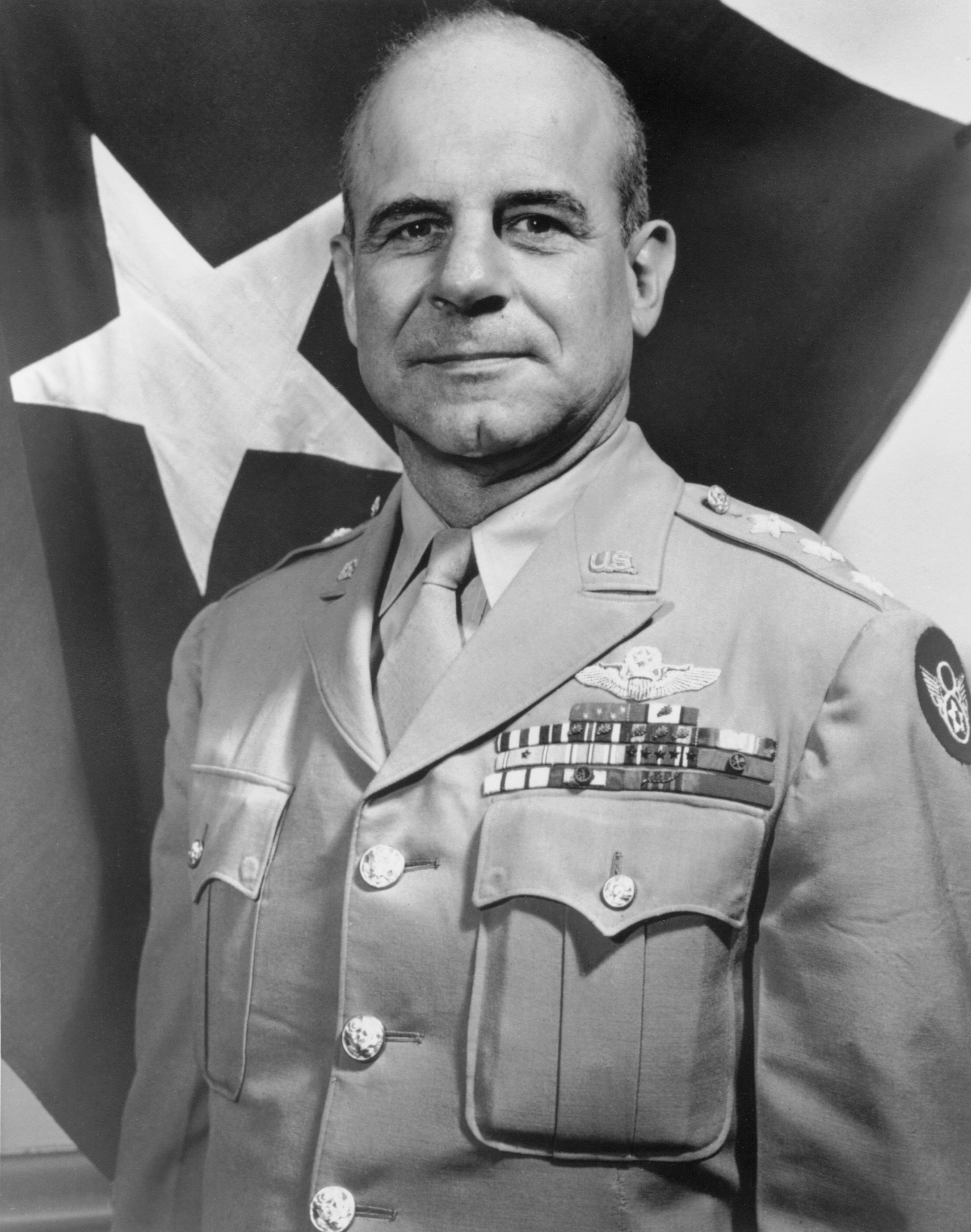
Lieutenant General Jimmy Doolittle was the first president of the Air Force Association.

Even before the end of World War II, General of the Army Henry H. Arnold, commanding general of the Army Air Forces, was beginning to consider establishing an organization for the three million airmen under his command who would become veterans after the war ended. This organization was not only intended to serve as a veterans' organization, but also be an advocacy group for airpower.

In August 1945, Arnold asked Edward Peck Curtis to build the Air Force Association. Then an executive at Eastman Kodak, Curtis retired from the Army Air Forces in 1944 as a major general and was a World War I flying ace. The first meeting occurred on 12 October 1945 in New York City. Aside from Curtis, the twelve founders were John S. Allard, Everett Richard Cook, who retired from the Army Air Forces in 1945 as a brigadier general and was a World War I flying ace, Jimmy Doolittle, who was an Army Air Forces lieutenant general and Medal of Honor recipient for flying the Doolittle Raid, W. Dearing Howe, Rufus Rand, Sol Rosenblatt, Julian Rosenthal, James Stewart, an actor and Army Air Forces colonel, Lowell P. Weicker, Cornelius Vanderbilt Whitney, an Army Air Forces colonel, and John Hay Whitney, an Army Air Forces intelligence officer.

While the group decided on the Air Force Association as the name, which was shared with an earlier group founded by Billy Mitchell, rejected names included the:

- Air Force Legion
- Air Force League
- Air Force Veterans Association
- Air Force Council
- Air Force Veterans Federation
- Air Force Veterans Alliance
- National Legion of Air Force Veterans
- National League of Air Force Veterans
- National Association of Air Force Veterans
- National Federation of Air Force Veterans
- National Fraternity of Air Force Veterans
- National Council of Air Force Veterans
- United League of Air Force Veterans
- United Federation of Air Force Veterans
- United Association of Air Force Veterans
- United Council of Air Force Veterans
- United Alliance of Air Force Veterans
- American Air Force Veterans
- American Veterans of the Air
- American Veterans of the Air Force
- Air Force Alumni Association

Consensus quickly formed that Jimmy Doolittle should be the first president, and in a January 1946 press conference, Doolittle announced the establishment of the Air Force Association. It was to be organized with a grass-roots structure composed of local, state, and regional affiliates. AFA also would publish a national magazine on airpower topics and sponsor educational programs to inform the public on airpower developments.

The Air Force Association was incorporated on 4 February 1946 in Washington D.C. Membership fees provided insufficient operating funds, and the association relied on additional donations from members. The association was a relatively prominent voice that was featured in The New York Times and other news media. In August 1946, the Air Force Association organized a coast-to-coast radio broadcast featuring Jimmy Stewart, who was made a vice president of the organization, and Ronald Reagan, who was a Hollywood actor and Army Air Force captain and AFA charter member.

The Air Force Association made good on its promise to publish an airpower magazine in July 1946, when it received ownership of Air Force Magazine, the official journal of the Army Air Forces. The publication had been founded by Gen. Henry "Hap" Arnold, commanding general of the Army Air Forces from 1941 to 1946, who had ordered "a first-class, slick-paper magazine - highly readable - the best of its kind - with worldwide circulation" be produced for its airmen. In 1917, Arnold had edited the Army Air Services' monthly newsletter as Chief of Information.

Public outreach was also made a priority, with Chief of Staff of the Air Force General Carl Spaatz telling delegates at AFA's first national convention in 1947 that "public support is as essential to effective airpower as industries, airplanes, and airmen." By the end of the Air Force Association's first year, it had incorporated 152 local squadrons, or chapters, in forty-five states.

On 18 September 1947, the Department of the Air Force was established and the Army Air Forces became the U.S. Air Force. Air Force Magazine declared that it was "The Day Billy Mitchell Dreamed Of." At its first AFA National Convention in Columbus, Ohio, General of the Army Dwight D. Eisenhower declared "the creation of the United States Air Force as an independent entity recognizes the special capabilities of airpower."

=== The Air Force's advocate ===
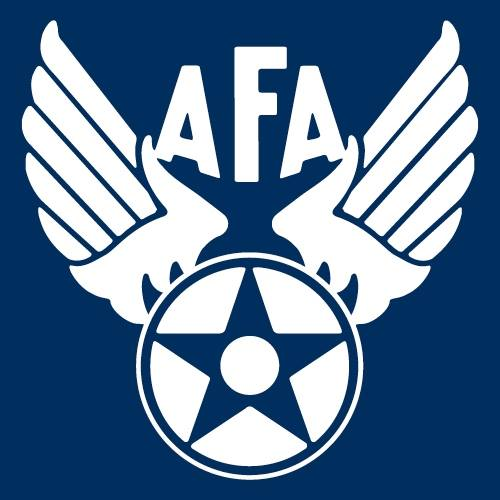
Logo of the Air Force Association until its renaming into the Air & Space Forces Association.

Despite independence, however, the Air Force's place was not assured. After the Allied victory, the United States began post-war demobilization. In their first statement of policy in 1948, the Air Force Association warned "while recognizing that peacetime airpower is expensive, we know that wartime airpower is far more costly" and began campaigning for a 70-group Air Force, which was also called for by a special presidential commission.

Dwindling budgets also increased interservice rivalry. In 1946, U.S. Navy leaders attempted to kill the Convair B-36 Peacemaker strategic bomber, instead advocating for carrier aviation. In part due to the advocacy of the Air Force Association, the Revolt of the Admirals was unsuccessful and the B-36 Peacemaker went into service.

The Air Force Association maintained a close relationship with Hollywood, which enabled it to directly communicate the need for airpower to the public. At AFA's second national convention, it held "Operation Wing Ding" at Madison Square Garden and featured its own vice president Jimmy Stewart along with Bob Hope, Marlene Dietrich, Lena Horne, Clark Gable, Dinah Shore, Jack Dempsey, Jerry Colonna, Jane Froman, Carmen Miranda, Margaret O'Brien, Walter Pidgeon, Herb Shriner, Gypsy Rose Lee, Joe E. Brown, Jinx Falkenburg, and The Rockettes. The performance was lauded as "the greatest show ever put on in Madison Square Garden" by the venue's president, John Kilpatrick. The "Wing Ding" was presented again at the Hollywood Bowl on 24 August 1951, with many of the same participants plus even more Hollywood notables. General LeMay was given a Man of the Year Award.

In 1950, the Air Force Reserve Officer Training Corps' Arnold Air Society honored society affiliates with the Air Force Association.

In 1953, the Air Reserve Association merged into the AFA. In May 1959, right before the first graduation at the United States Air Force Academy, AFA sponsored its first outstanding-squadron dinner, which would later become a highlighted event for the association.

The Air Force Association embraced the arrival of the jet age, sponsoring four national Jet Age Conferences starting in 1956. The same year, Air Force Magazine published an article on Strategic Air Command which got national attention when Arthur Godfrey told his primetime audience on CBS to read it. On 1 May 1956, AFA created the Air Force Association Foundation, soon renamed the Aerospace Education Foundation, to manage its education programs.

At its 1956 National Convention, the Air Force Association, in partnership with the Air Force, inaugurated its Outstanding Airman of the Air Force program to recognize enlisted airmen. The 1957 "Golden Anniversary" issue of Air Force Magazine, produced with the Air Force Historical Research Division, marked fifty years since the establishment of the Army Signal Corps' Aeronautical Division.

The Air Force Association marked 1959 with the World Congress of Flight in Las Vegas. Featuring aircraft from 52 nations, the World Congress of Flight was the first international, and the largest, air and space show in the United States and was televised by NBC to over 40 million viewers and covered in Life magazine.

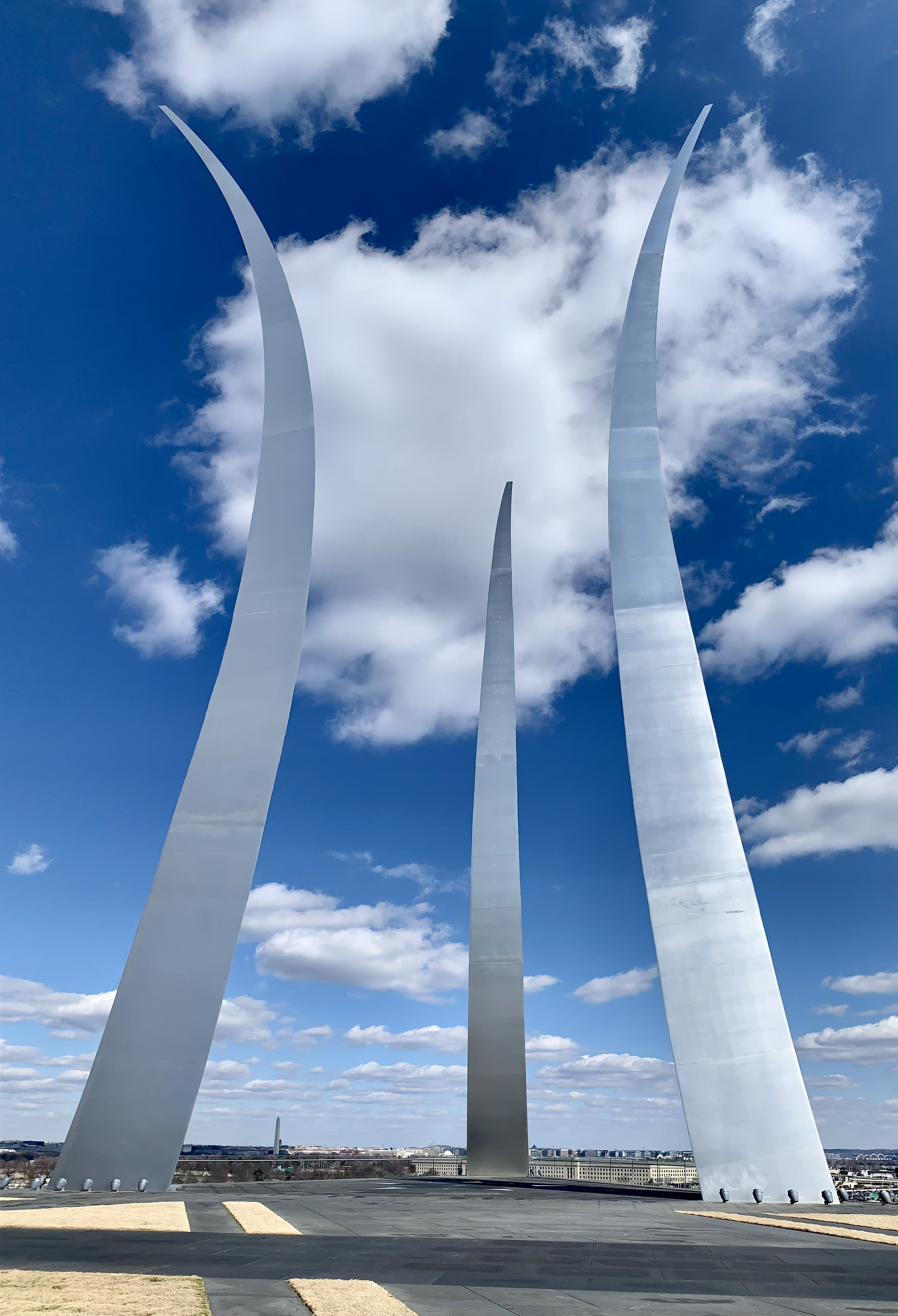
The Air Force Association led the development of the Air Force Memorial.

In 1963, the Air Force Association adopted a statement of policy opposing the Partial Nuclear Test Ban Treaty, infuriating Secretary of Defense Robert McNamara. Under political pressure, Secretary of the Air Force Eugene M. Zuckert withdrew from his attendance at the AFA National Convention, but Chief of Staff General Curtis LeMay still attended.

The following year, in 1964, the Air Force Association's Airmen's Council asked the Air Force to establish a "Sergeant Major of the Air Force", mirroring the position of the Sergeant Major of the Marine Corps as the senior enlisted advisor. The service initially demurred, but in 1967 established the Chief Master Sergeant of the Air Force to serve in the same role. In 2020, the new U.S. Space Force created the Chief Master Sergeant of the Space Force to advocate for enlisted guardians.

In 1967, the Aerospace Education Foundation and the United States Office of Education tested Air Force technical training courses in Utah public schools. Project Utah's success paved the way to create the Community College of the Air Force. The two organizations also held the first National Laboratory for the Advancement of Education.

In October 1969, Air Force Magazine published "The Forgotten Americans of the Vietnam War" as its cover story, generating national awareness of prisoners of war. The article was republished as the lead in Reader's Digest, read on the floor of the United States Congress, and entered into the Congressional Record six times. AFA's national president was a special guest at the White House's tribute for returning prisoners of war in 1971.

In 1988 and 1990, the Air Force Association and Aerospace Education Foundation published two white papers, "Lifeline in Danger" and "Lifeline Adrift", warning of problems with the United States defense industry. In 1991, the Aerospace Education Foundation and USA Today jointly ran the "Visions of Exploration" program to educate public school students on 21st-century issues.

In 1992, the Air Force Association established the United States Air Force Memorial Foundation. Construction began on the memorial near the Pentagon in 2004; it was dedicated in 2006 in a ceremony attended by President George W. Bush, an Air National Guard veteran.

In 1994, Air Force Magazine published a special report on the National Air and Space Museum's plans to display the Enola Gay B-29 Superfortress bomber, which dropped the Little Boy atomic bomb on Hiroshima. AFA called the museum's plans politically rigged and lacking balance and historical context and worked together with other veteran groups to propose changes to the exhibit. The outcry from Congress, the news media, and public forced the museum to modify its display plans.

=== The Air and Space Forces' advocate ===
The Air & Space Forces association has called for the Department of the Air Force to rename itself to the Department of the Air and Space Forces, the National Reconnaissance Office to integrate into the USSF, and the development of Space Force crewed combat spaceplanes.

While supporting the Air Force, the Air Force Association also advocated for its space and cyber programs.

In 2009, AFA established the CyberPatriot program to prepare high school students in careers in cybersecurity or other STEM fields. In 2013, CyberPatriot becomes an international program, expanding to the United Kingdom, Australia, Saudi Arabia, and Japan.

In 2014, the Secretary of the Air Force requested that the Air Force Association create a similar program to CyberPatriot that was space-focused, with AFA creating the StellarXplorers STEM education program built on orbit determination, spacecraft design, and launch vehicle operations.

In 2013, the Mitchell Institute for Airpower Studies was renamed the Mitchell Institute for Aerospace Studies and in 2016, the Air Force Association's Air and Space Conference was renamed the Air, Space, and Cyber Conference.

Following the 2019 establishment of the U.S. Space Force, the Air Force Association positioned itself to continue supporting the new service, updating its mission statement to include the USSF and Guardians in April 2020. On April 7, 2022, the Air Force Association renamed itself the Air & Space Forces Association to better represent the United States Space Force. In September 2022, Air Force Magazine was renamed Air & Space Forces.

Following the Space Force's establishment, the Air Force Association called for the Department of the Air Force to rename itself the Department of the Air and Space Forces, integrate the National Reconnaissance Office into the U.S. Space Force, and develop crewed and uncrewed combat spaceplanes for the new service.

== Organization ==
AFA is divided into three geographic areas, comprising 14 regions, each led by a region president.

Predominantly a volunteer organization, the association has more than 200 chapters in 49 states (Maine is the only state without a chapter) and other countries including the United Kingdom, Germany, Italy, Belgium, Japan, and the Republic of Korea. As of August 2024, AFA had a membership of 123,292 of whom 40,281 are life members (permanent membership), organized into local chapters. AFA membership in 2024 included 23.85% on active duty military and 64.27% retired or former military.

== Finances ==
The AFA had a total revenue of $31,493,812 in 2024. Also that year it reported $3,890,178 in net income, $78,090,714 in total assets and $50,771,020 in net assets. Total expenses for 2024 were $27,603,634. The AFA was rated 87% "three-star charity" from Charity Navigator.

== Programs ==
As part of its education mandate the association publishes Air Force Magazine and the online electronic news brief Daily Report. Air Force Magazine began in September 1918 as the D.M.A. Weekly News Letter, originally published by the Information Branch of the Division of Military Aeronautics, and changed names several times, becoming Air Force Magazine in January 1943 and Air & Space Forces Magazine in September 2022. The Air Force Association assumed responsibility for its publication and content beginning in July 1946.

AFA hosts professional development conferences which feature speakers, workshops, trade shows and presentations by Air Force and national defense leaders. The organization has a public policy and research arm, the Mitchell Institute for Airpower Studies run by the dean, Lt. Gen. David Deptula, USAF (Ret).

AFA runs CyberPatriot, a national youth cyber education program that promotes student interest in cyber security and other science, technology, engineering, and mathematics (STEM) career fields. StellarXplorers is another STEM program with a focus on youth competing to provide solutions to spacecraft design and launch planning.

In 2023, the AFA recorded more than 18,000 registrants for the annual Air, Space & Cyber Conference. In 2024, there were more than 22,000 registrants.

The "Visions of Exploration" program has its members distribute educational materials to schools and concerned citizens. This is done in part through a joint multi-disciplinary science, math and social studies program with USA Today.

The Arnold Air Society and Silver Wings are university level arm of the organization embedded in college and university Air Force ROTC units.

As part of its support programs AFA provides more than $1.5 million in scholarships, grants, and awards. AFA's educational programs and scholarships are intended to encourage Air Force members to continue their education, provide funds to Air Force spouses working towards a degree, and administer grants that develop programs promoting math and science skills among young people.

AFA was a key organization in building the United States Air Force Memorial and coordinating its dedication on 14 October 2006. The organization was involved in its day-to-day operations until April 2017 when the memorial was transferred to the Air Force District of Washington.

On 1 May 2026, the annual "Salute to Space" was held and during the event, the bronze statue of General Bernard A. Schriever was unveiled at the Arlington headquarters of the AFA.

== See also ==
- Space Force Association
