= Del Norte High School (San Diego) =

Public high school in San Diego, California, United States

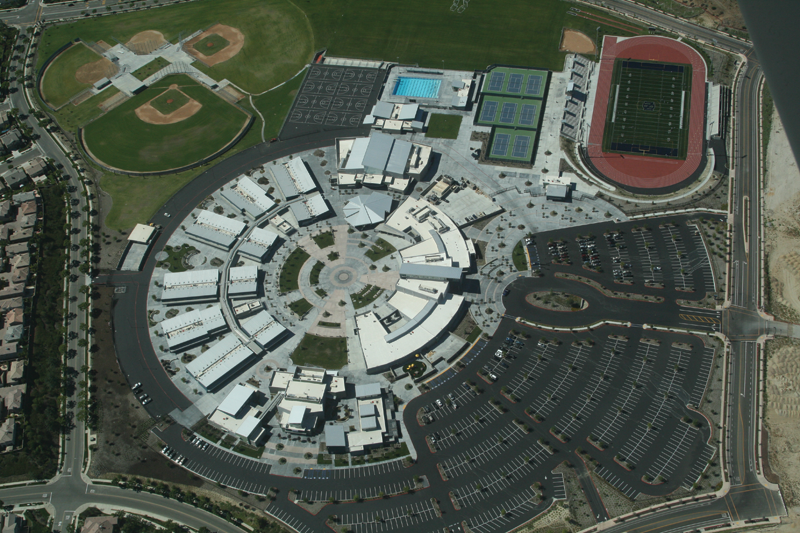

Location
- 16601 Nighthawk Lane; San Diego, California 92127; United States; 33°0′52″N 117°7′20″W

Information
- Type: Public high school
- Motto: College Ready, Future Focused, Globally Aware
- Established: 19 August 2009; 17 years ago
- School district: Poway Unified School District
- Principal: Ty Eveleth
- Staff: 102.71 (FTE)
- Grades: 9-12
- Enrollment: 2,564 (2023–2024)
- Student to teacher ratio: 24.96
- Campus size: 62 acres (25 ha)
- Colors: Evergreen, Navy Blue, and Vegas Gold
- Nickname: Nighthawks
- Website: delnorte.powayusd.com

Del Norte High School is a public high school in San Diego, California. It primarily serves the communities of 4S Ranch and Del Sur. It is part of Poway Unified School District.

== History ==
Del Norte opened on August 19, 2009, and is the most recent comprehensive high school to be opened in Poway Unified School District. The campus covers 210,093 square feet (19,518.3 m^{2}) of land.

During its first year, Del Norte was expected to have approximately 700 students in order to create a personalized learning experience. Also notable was the absence of juniors and seniors, as the first year only contained freshmen and sophomores. The expected student population after the first few years was approximately 2,250 students.

On May 13, 2014, the Bernardo Fire broke out near the school, leading to the evacuation of 21,000 nearby houses.

On May 26, 2022, Del Norte High School and several nearby schools in Poway Unified School District were put into complete lockdown because of shooting threats called into the police station. The following day, many students left their homeroom period in a walkout to protest gun violence and honor the lives lost just two days prior during the Uvalde school shooting.

Beginning in the 2023–24 school year, longtime Del Norte administrator Ty Eveleth, who had previously served as assistant principal starting 2020, and a school counselor beginning in 2013, became Del Norte's principal. Eveleth succeeded Bryan Schultz, who served as principal between 2018 and 2023.

== Enrollment ==
In the 2021–22 school year, 2,585 students were enrolled at Del Norte, with a senior class of 675 students. Student enrollment in 2020 was reported as 38.4% White, 38.3% Asian, 10.4% Hispanic or Latino, 8.2% two or more races, 1.5% African American, 0.3% Native Hawaiian or Pacific Islander, and 0.2% Native American or Alaska Native.

== Campus ==
The school is modeled after the layout of another PUSD school, Westview High School. The design is a radial pattern, with all buildings linking to a central common area. Del Norte is equipped with technology including a school-wide data-sharing network, VoIP, and Promethean Activboards in all classrooms.

== Athletics ==
The athletic programs that are offered are: sideline cheer, men's water polo, football, girls' field hockey, girls' golf, girls' tennis, girls' volleyball, and cross country in the fall; sideline cheer, basketball, soccer, girls' water polo, wrestling, club roller hockey and club rugby in the winter; badminton, competitive cheer, boys' golf, lacrosse, boys' tennis, boys' volleyball, swimming/dive, baseball, softball, girls' gymnastics, and track and field in the spring. Del Norte submitted a California Interscholastic Federation (CIF) membership application for the 2009–10 year.

In February 2023, former National Football League linebacker Nick Barnett was announced as the new head coach of the football team, becoming the eighth former NFL player to coach a high school team in San Diego. On November 25, 2023, the football team won the CIF Division 2 Championship, the first CIF football championship in program history.

== Academic rankings ==
In 2022, Niche and U.S. News both ranked Del Norte the 4th best high school in San Diego area.

For 2025, U.S. News ranked Del Norte as the 3rd best public high school in the San Diego area, while Del Norte dropped to 6th in the Niche rankings for best public high school.

Del Norte also plans to offer these AP classes for the 2025-2026 school year, Biology, Calculus AB, Calculus BC, Chemistry, Chinese Language, Computer Science Principles, Computer Science A, English Language, English Literature, Environmental Science, World History, Human Geography, Music Theory, Physics C: Electricity & Magnetism, Physics C: Mechanics, Psychology, Spanish Language, Statistics, Studio Art (2D, 3D, Drawing & Painting), U.S. Government & Politics, U.S. History.

== Notable alumni ==
- Mason Abbiate, Paralympic soccer player
- Duran Ferree, American professional soccer player, first player signed by Major League Soccer club San Diego FC
- Quenton Meeks, American football cornerback for the Tennessee Titans of the National Football League
- Haley Cruse Mitchell, American former professional softball player
- Nya Harrison, American professional soccer player, currently with the San Diego Wave FC

== See also ==
- Primary and secondary schools in San Diego, California
