= Nysmith School for the Gifted =

Coordinates: 38.9244°N 77.4211°W

Nysmith
- Herndon, Virginia

Information
- Type: Private
- Motto: Youth is a tiny window of expansive opportunity
- Established: 1983
- School district: Herndon
- President: Ken Nysmith
- Principal: Ken Nysmith
- Head of school: Ken Nysmith
- Grades: PreK - 8th grade
- Colors: Blue and white
- Mascot: Eagle
- Website: http://www.nysmith.com/

Nysmith School is a preparatory school located in Herndon, Virginia that teaches from pre-kindergarten through eighth grade. It was founded in 1983 by Carol Nysmith, and is now principally run by Kenneth Nysmith, her son. Nysmith aims to have high-quality teacher, small class sizes, and a diversified curriculum that includes daily reading, math, science, computers, and foreign language. Nysmith School is well known for their alumni and is also one of the Johns Hopkins Top 10 Schools in Virginia.

== Academics ==
Nysmith offers a curriculum that includes advanced coursework in mathematics, language arts, science, and technology beginning at early grade levels. The curriculum allows students to learn up to 4 grade levels above their age.

The school places particular emphasis on fostering curiosity, problem-solving, and project-based learning. Students regularly participate in academic competitions such as science fairs, robotics contests, and writing challenges, with many earning regional and national recognition.

== Technology and STEM Focus ==
Nysmith is known for its early adoption of STEM education. The school maintains four computer labs, coding programs, robotics resources, and technology is embedded across subject areas. Students often begin coding in the primary grades and progress to more advanced programming, engineering, and robotics projects in middle school.

== Campus and Facilities ==
The campus includes:

- 75,000 square feet of indoor space with 55 classrooms
- 4 computer labs
- 2 gymnasiums and a rock climbing wall
- 4 soccer fields
- 8 basketball courts
- 1 performance stage
- 1 library

== Recognition ==
Over the years, Nysmith School for the Gifted has been recognized for its strong academic outcomes. Its alumni go on to attend competitive high schools and later pursue a wide range of academic and professional paths.

Listed below are some awards:

- 2025 - Innovate Award at the VEX IQ World Championship
- 2025 - Several Nysmith students were honored at the Northern Virginia Science & Engineering Fair (NVSE Fair) for their science and engineering projects.
- 2025 - Nysmith students qualified for the finals of the American Computer Science League (ACSL) coding competition.
- 2025 – Math Competitions - Nysmith students placed highly in math competitions: strong results in the national Math Kangaroo Competition, and victories in regional/state math tournaments (DMV Math Tournament, Math League, etc.)
- 2025 - The Nysmith debate / forensics teams had notable success in 2025: top-place finishes in events including the USA Forensics Olympiad Championship.
- 2024 - a Nysmith student won 1st place in their division at the Greater Northern Virginia Science & Engineering Fair.

Civil Rights and Antisemitism

According to a complaint investigated by the Virginia Attorney General’s Office and the Louis D. Brandeis Center for Human Rights Under Law, administrators allegedly ignored escalating abuse directed at an 11-year-old Jewish student, including anti-Jewish slurs, social shunning, and claims celebrating violence against Jews. When the student’s family repeatedly sought intervention, the headmaster allegedly dismissed the concerns, telling the parents their daughter “needed to toughen up,” before expelling all three of the family’s children two days later. The Brandeis Center stated that the school had “fostered an environment that allowed anti-Semitic harassment,” noting that earlier in the year a class project on “strong historical leaders” resulted in students producing an illustration prominently featuring Adolf Hitler, which the school then circulated to the community. Critics argued that such decisions reflected a profound failure to uphold basic standards of safety, inclusivity, and historical awareness; it beggars belief, they contended, that a school with a reputation for academic excellence allowed the harassment of students on the basis of religion and permitted classroom activities that appeared to lionize one of history’s most notorious perpetrators of genocide. The school boasts a 9:1 faculty to student ratio. Following complaints, the school canceled its annual talk hosting a Holocaust survivor to speak with the student body about antisemitism.

Under the settlement, Nysmith agreed to adopt new nondiscrimination policies explicitly defining antisemitism, create a committee to investigate discrimination claims, undergo five years of independent monitoring, provide staff training, and issue a public apology expressing regret for the expulsions. The school also paid nearly $150,000 to reimburse the family’s expenses. Representatives for the affected family stated that the children would not return to the school. According to the settlement agreement between Nysmith and the injured parties, the school is required to post the nondiscrimination policies and procedures from Exhibit 2 of the settlement, in addition to distribution to staff and parents, within two days of the issuance of the settlement. As of the 19th of November, two days from the issuance of the settlement, the information is not available on the Nysmith website.
