= National Collegiate Cyber Defense Competition =

The National Collegiate Cyber Defense Competition (NCCDC) is the championship event for the Collegiate Cyber Defense Competition system – the largest college-level cyber defense competition in the United States. The event is held annually in the San Antonio area.

In an effort to help facilitate the development of a regular, national level cyber security exercise, the Center for Infrastructure Assurance and Security at the University of Texas at San Antonio (UTSA) hosted the first Collegiate Cyber Defense Competition for the Southwestern region in May 2005. On June 29, 2010, United States House legislature passed recognizing the National CCDC for promoting cyber security curriculum.

While similar to other cyber defense competitions in many aspects, the NCCDC, is unique in that it focuses on the operational aspect of managing and protecting an existing network infrastructure. While other exercises examine the abilities of a group of students to design, configure, and protect a network over the course of an entire semester, this competition is more focused on the operational task of assuming administrative and protective duties for an existing commercial network. Teams are assessed based on their ability to detect and respond to outside threats, maintain availability of existing services such as mail servers and web servers, respond to business requests such as the addition or removal of additional services, and balance security needs against business needs.

== Rules ==
The NCCDC is operated under the rules as published by the Center for Infrastructure Assurance and Security at UTSA. The current rules can be found at Homepage.

== Regional competitions ==
Several regional groups have formed to provide qualifying events for the NCCDC annual event. Some regions share and overlap various states. Every effort is made to make each regional event consistent with the NCCDC event.

Name	Comprised region
At-Large Collegiate Cyber Defense Competition	Alaska, Hawaii, Puerto Rico, Montana, North Dakota, South Dakota, and Wyoming
Mid-Atlantic Collegiate Cyber Defense Competition	Delaware, District of Columbia, Maryland, New Jersey, North Carolina, Pennsylvania, Virginia, and West Virginia
Midwest Collegiate Cyber Defense Competition	Illinois, Indiana, Iowa, Michigan, Minnesota, Missouri, Kentucky, Ohio, and Wisconsin
Northeastern Collegiate Cyber Defense Competition	Connecticut, Maine, Massachusetts, New Hampshire, New York, Rhode Island, and Vermont
Pacific Rim Collegiate Cyber Defense Competition	Idaho, Oregon, and Washington
Rocky Mountain Collegiate Cyber Defense Competition	Colorado, Kansas, Nebraska, and Utah
Southeast Collegiate Cyber Defense Competition	Alabama, Florida, Georgia, Mississippi, North Carolina, South Carolina, and Tennessee
Southwest Collegiate Cyber Defense Competition	Arkansas, Louisiana, New Mexico, Oklahoma, and Texas
Western Regional Collegiate Cyber Defense Competition	Arizona, California, and Nevada

== Past competitions ==
Date of Event	First Place	Second Place	Third Place	Other Competing Teams
April 24-26, 2026	Dakota State University, SD	University of Virginia, VA	Western Washington University, WA	DePaul University, IL; Stanford University, CA; University of California, Irvine, CA; University of Central Florida, FL; University of Colorado Boulder, CO; University of Massachusetts Lowell, MA; University of Texas at San Antonio, TX
April 25-27, 2025	University of California, Irvine, CA	University of Virginia, VA	Dakota State University, SD	Brigham Young University, UT; Oregon State University, OR; Tennessee Tech, TN; University of Central Florida, FL; University of Massachusetts Lowell, MA; University of Texas at Austin, TX
April 25-27, 2024	University of Central Florida, FL	Cal Poly Pomona, CA	University of Texas, TX	Brigham Young University, UT; Dakota State University, SD; Indiana Tech, IN; Northeastern University, MA; Oregon State University, OR; University of California, Irvine, CA; University of Virginia, VA
April 28–30, 2023	Stanford University, CA	Cal Poly Pomona, CA	DePaul University, IL	Brigham Young University, UT; Dakota State University, SD; Northeastern University, MA; Oregon State University, OR; University of North Florida, FL; University of Texas at Austin, TX; University of Virginia, VA
April 21–23, 2022	University of Central Florida, FL	Dakota State University, SD	Stanford University, CA	Brigham Young University, UT; DePaul University, IL; Liberty University, VA; Northeastern University, MA; Oregon State University, OR; University of Texas at Austin, TX; University of Virginia, VA
April 23–25, 2021	University of Central Florida, FL	DePaul University, IL	George Mason University, VA	Brigham Young University, UT; College of Charleston, SC; Rochester Institute of Technology, NY; University of California at Irvine, CA; University of Maryland, Baltimore County, MD; University of Texas at Austin, TX; University of Washington, WA
May 22–24, 2020	University of Virginia, VA	University of Central Florida, FL	Stanford University, CA	DePaul University, IL; Kennesaw State University, GA; Red Rocks Community College, CO; Rochester Institute of Technology, NY; University of Maryland, Baltimore County, MD; University of Tulsa, OK; University of Washington, WA
April 23–25, 2019	University of Virginia, VA	University of Central Florida, FL	Rochester Institute of Technology, NY	Baldwin Wallace University, OH; Dakota State University, SD; Stanford University, CA; University of Alaska at Anchorage, AK; University of Tulsa, OK; University of Washington, WA; Utah Valley University, UT
April 13–15, 2018	University of Virginia, VA	University of Central Florida, FL	Dakota State University, SD	Baylor University, TX; California State University at Northridge, CA; Indiana Tech, IN; University at Buffalo, NY; University of Alaska at Fairbanks, AK; University of Washington, WA; Utah Valley University, UT
April 13–15, 2017	University of Maryland, Baltimore County, MD	University of Tulsa, OK	Brigham Young University, UT	DePaul University, IL; California State University at Northridge, CA; Montana Tech, MT; Rochester Institute of Technology, NY; University of Alaska at Fairbanks, AK; University of South Alabama, AL; University of Washington, WA
April 22–24, 2016	University of Central Florida, FL	Brigham Young University, UT	DePaul University, IL	Cal Poly Pomona, CA; Columbia Basin College, WA; Dakota State University, SD; Liberty University, VA; Northeastern University, MA; University of Alaska at Anchorage, AK; University of Tulsa, OK
April 24–26, 2015	University of Central Florida, FL	University of California at Berkeley, CA	Rochester Institute of Technology, NY	DePaul University, IL; ITT Tech Boise, ID; Southern Utah University, UT; University of Alaska at Fairbanks, AK; University of Maryland, Baltimore County, MD; University of Nebraska at Kearney, NE; University of Texas at San Antonio, TX
April 25–27, 2014	University of Central Florida, FL	Rochester Institute of Technology, NY	University of Alaska at Fairbanks, AK	Dakota State University, SD; Northern Kentucky University, KY; Southern Methodist University, TX; Towson University, MD; Air Force Academy, CO; University of California at Berkeley, CA; Western Washington University, WA
April 19–21, 2013	Rochester Institute of Technology, NY	Dakota State University, SD	Rose-Hulman Institute of Technology, IN	Cal Poly Pomona, CA; Millersville University, PA; Oklahoma State University, OK; Air Force Academy, CO; University of Alaska at Fairbanks, AK; University of Central Florida, FL; University of Washington, WA
April 20–22, 2012	University of Washington, WA	Air Force Academy, CO	Texas A&M University, TX	Cal Poly Pomona, CA; Rochester Institute of Technology, NY; St. Cloud State University, MN; Towson University, MD; University of Alaska at Fairbanks, AK; University of North Carolina at Charlotte, NC; University of Wyoming, WY
April 8–10, 2011	University of Washington, WA	Texas A&M University, TX	University of Louisville, KY	Cal Poly Pomona, CA; Indiana Tech, IN; Rochester Institute of Technology, NY; Air Force Academy, CO; University of Maryland, MD; University of Wyoming, WY
April 16–18, 2010	Northeastern University, MA	University of Louisville, KY	Cal Poly Pomona, CA	DePaul University, IL; Montana Tech, MT; Texas A&M University, TX; Towson University, MD; University of Washington, WA
April 17–19, 2009	Baker College at Flint, MI	Northeastern University, MA	Texas A&M University, TX	Cal Poly Pomona, CA; Dakota State University, SD; University of North Carolina at Charlotte, NC; University of Pittsburgh, PA; University of Washington, WA
April 18–20, 2008	Baker College at Flint, MI	Texas A&M University, TX	University of Louisville, KY	Community College of Baltimore County, MD; Mt. San Antonio College, CA; Rochester Institute of Technology, NY
April 13–15, 2007	Texas A&M University, TX	Millersville University, PA	University of Louisville, KY	Indiana Tech, IN
April 21–23, 2006	University of North Carolina at Charlotte, NC	Millersville University, PA	Southern Illinois University, IL	University of Texas at San Antonio, TX
April 15–17, 2005 (Note: This was the CCDC pilot competition.)	Texas A&M University, TX			Del Mar College, TX; University of Texas at Austin, TX; University of Texas at San Antonio, TX; University of North Texas, TX

== See also ==
- List of computer science awards
