= List of education awards =

This list of education awards is an index to articles about notable awards in the field of education. These are faculty awards and teacher awards, and awards given to educational institutions, as opposed to awards given to students. The list also excludes science communication awards, which are covered by a separate list.

== International ==
| Country | Award | Sponsor | Description |
|---|---|---|---|
| International | Annie Spink Award for Excellence in Architectural Education | Royal Institute of British Architects | The biennial Annie Spink award has been presented since 2000 to individuals who have made an outstanding contribution to architectural education in a higher education institution with courses validated by the RIBA anywhere in the world. |
| International | Dina Feitelson Research Award | International Literacy Association | Outstanding empirical study on one or more aspects of literacy acquisition |
| International | José Vasconcelos World Award of Education | World Cultural Council | Renowned educators, experts in the field of teaching, and legislators of education policies who have significant influence in enriching the culture of mankind |
| International | Noma Literacy Prize | UNESCO | Group or individual who has done most to combat illiteracy |
| International | UNESCO Confucius Prize for Literacy | UNESCO | Literacy work serving rural adults and out-of-school youth, particularly women and girls |
| International | UNESCO King Sejong Literacy Prize | UNESCO | Institutions, organizations or individuals for their contribution to the fight against illiteracy |
| International | UNESCO Nadezhda K. Krupskaya literacy prize | UNESCO | Meritorious work in the field of adult literacy (1970–1992) |
| International | UNESCO Prize for Girls’ and Women’s Education | UNESCO | Outstanding contributions to the advancement of female education |

== United Kingdom ==
| Country | Award | Sponsor | Description |
|---|---|---|---|
| United Kingdom / Ireland | Sandford Award | Bishop Grosseteste University | Education programmes at heritage sites |
| United Kingdom | Total Green School Awards | Young People's Trust for the Environment | Excellence in environmental education |
| United Kingdom | Lifetime Contribution Award | Standing Conference of Schools of Architecture | Outstanding lifetime achievement in architectural higher education |
| United Kingdom | AoC Beacon Awards | Association of Colleges | Recognises and promotes the interdependence of further education colleges |
| United Kingdom | Artsmark | Arts Council England | Framework for teachers and education professionals to plan, develop and evaluate their arts and cultural provision |
| United Kingdom | Global Teacher Prize | Varkey Foundation | Teacher who has made an outstanding contribution to the profession |
| United Kingdom | International School Award | British Council | Rewarding those schools with a notable global element in their curriculum |
| United Kingdom | Lawrence Bragg Medal and Prize | Institute of Physics | Individuals involved in physics outreach that demonstrate outstanding and sustained contributions to physics education |
| United Kingdom | Queen's Anniversary Prize | Royal Anniversary Trust | Universities and Colleges in the further and higher education sectors in the UK |
| United Kingdom | Sunday Times University of the Year | The Sunday Times | All round academic excellence |
| United Kingdom | Teaching Awards | Teaching Awards Trust | Outstanding headteachers, teachers, teaching assistants, lecturers and school teams |
| United Kingdom | The Edublog Awards | James N. Farmer | Excellent practice in the use of weblogs and social media to facilitate education (2004–2015) |
| United Kingdom | The Sir Misha Black Awards | Design and Industries Association etc. | Design education |

== Canada ==
| Country | Award | Sponsor | Description |
|---|---|---|---|
| Canada | APEX Awards of Excellence | Government of Canada | Recognizes management excellence |
| Canada | Public Service Award of Excellence | Government of Canada | Recognizes employees who have excelled in the achievement of results |
| Canada | Order of Canada | Government of Canada | Recognizes people in sectors of Canadian society, and outstanding achievement, dedication, and service to the nation |
| Canada | National Public Service Week | Government of Canada | A week to celebrate and acknowledge the contribution of federal public service employees |
| Canada | Order of Merit | Government of Canada ] | Awards exceptional service in armed forces; the arts, literature and science; or persons the Sovereign chooses |
| Canada | United Nations Public Service Awards | Government of Canada | Recognizes the contribution of public servants to the role, professionalism, image and visibility of the public service |
| Canada | Gold Harvest Awards | Agriculture and Agri-Food Canada (AAFC) | Recognize employees for their contributions to diversity and inclusion in the workplace through formal and informal mechanisms |
| Canada, Quebec | Canadian Agricultural Hall of Fame | Canadian Agricultural Hall of Fame | Recognize individuals who have made remarkable contributions to Canadian agriculture. |

== United States ==
| Country | Award | Sponsor | Description |
|---|---|---|---|
| United States | IACE Hall of Fame | International Adult and Continuing Education Hall of Fame | Leaders in the fields of continuing education and adult learning |
| United States | MfA Stipend | Math for America | Stipend and tuition for math teachers |
| United States | NTHF Hall of Fame | National Teachers Hall of Fame | Exceptional school teachers |
| United States | AWM/MAA Falconer Lecturer | Association for Women in Mathematics and Mathematical Association of America | Women who have made distinguished contributions to the mathematical sciences or mathematics education |
| United States | Broad Prize for Urban Education | Eli Broad Foundation | Recognizes school districts in urban areas for closing the achievement gap improving academic performance of low-income and minority students |
| United States | Clark Kerr Award | University of California, Berkeley | Extraordinary and distinguished contribution to the advancement of higher education |
| United States | Deborah and Franklin Haimo Awards for Distinguished College or University Teaching of Mathematics | Mathematical Association of America | Teachers who have been widely recognized as extraordinarily successful and whose teaching effectiveness has been shown to have had influence beyond their own institutions |
| United States | Edyth May Sliffe Award | Mathematical Association of America | Five teachers selected from each of the ten American Mathematics Competition Regions |
| United States | Elizabeth W. Jones Award for Excellence in Education | Genetics Society of America | Noteworthy contributions to genetics education |
| United States | Emily M. Gray Award | Biophysical Society | Significant contributions to education in biophysics |
| United States | George Westinghouse Award (ASEE) | American Society for Engineering Education | Outstanding contributions to engineering education |
| United States | Golden Apple Award (education) | various | Educators |
| United States | Grawemeyer Award | University of Louisville | Education, ideas improving world order, music composition, religion, and psychology |
| United States | Harold W. McGraw Prize in Education | McGraw-Hill Education etc. | Outstanding individuals who have dedicated themselves to improving education through new approaches |
| United States | Hesburgh Award | Teachers Insurance and Annuity Association of America | University that has exceptional faculty development programs |
| United States | IEEE James H. Mulligan Jr. Education Medal | Institute of Electrical and Electronics Engineers | Educator's contributions to the vitality, imagination, and leadership of the members of the engineering profession |
| United States | Innovations in Reading Prize | National Book Foundation | Organizations and individuals who have developed innovative means of creating and sustaining a lifelong love of reading |
| United States | James Bryant Conant Award | Education Commission of the States | Outstanding individual contributions to American education |
| United States | John R. Ragazzini Award | American Automatic Control Council | Outstanding contributions to automatic control education |
| United States | Kohl International Teaching Awards | Dolores Kohl Education Foundation | Elementary and high school teachers as well as media and lifetime contributors to the field of education |
| United States | Lindback Award | Lindback Foundation | Distinguished teaching at colleges and universities in New Jersey, Pennsylvania, Maryland, Delaware, and Virginia |
| United States | Louise Hay Award | Association for Women in Mathematics | Contributions as a math educator |
| United States | Milken Educator Award | Milken Family Foundation | To celebrate, elevate and activate the teaching profession |
| United States | National Blue Ribbon Schools Program | United States Department of Education | Exemplary public and non-public schools |
| United States | National Science Foundation CAREER Awards | National Science Foundation | Junior faculty who exemplify the role of teacher-scholars through research, education and the integration of education and research within the context of the mission of their organizations |
| United States | National Teacher of the Year | Council of Chief State School Officers | Excellence in teaching |
| United States | Oersted Medal | American Association of Physics Teachers | Notable contributions to the teaching of physics |
| United States | Penny Crane Award for Distinguished Service | Association for Computing Machinery | significant contributions to the University and College Computing Services Special Interest Group, and to computing in higher education |
| United States | Presidential Award for Excellence in Mathematics and Science Teaching | National Science Foundation | Outstanding teaching in the United States |
| United States | Ralph R. Teetor Educational Award | SAE Ralph Teetor Educational Fund | Educators who are preparing engineers for their careers |
| United States | Ramón Margalef Award for Excellence in Education | Association for the Sciences of Limnology and Oceanography | Innovations and excellence in teaching and mentoring students in the fields of limnology and oceanography |
| United States | Richtmyer Memorial Award | American Association of Physics Teachers | Educators who have made outstanding contributions as teachers, and have imparted information and motivation to participants in the field |
| United States | Robert Foster Cherry Award | Baylor University | Professors at the College or University level, in the English-speaking world, with established track records of teaching excellence and the ability to inspire students |
| United States | Rowman & Littlefield Award in Innovative Teaching | Rowman & Littlefield | Developers of effective new approaches to teaching among political scientists |
| United States | Sharon Keillor Award for Women in Engineering Education | American Society for Engineering Education | Outstanding women engineering educators |
| United States | The Christa McAuliffe Prize | University of Nebraska–Lincoln | Teacher in Nebraska for showing courage in education |
| United States | Wilbur Cross Medal | Yale Graduate School Alumni Association | Distinguished achievements in scholarship, teaching, academic administration, and public service |

== Other ==
| Country | Award | Sponsor | Description |
|---|---|---|---|
| Australia | New South Wales Institute for Educational Research Award for Outstanding Educational Research | New South Wales Institute for Educational Research | Outstanding doctoral theses in educational research |
| Australia | Prime Minister's Award for Australian University Teacher of the Year | Prime Minister | For exceptional record of advancing student learning, educational leadership and scholarly contributions to teaching and learning |
| Australia | Prime Minister's Prizes for Science | Prime Minister | Excellence in Science Teaching |
| Canada | 3M Teaching Fellow | Society for Teaching and Learning in Higher Education, 3M Canada | Excellence in educational leadership and teaching at the university and college level |
| Canada | Adrien Pouliot Award | Canadian Mathematical Society | Significant contributions to mathematics education in Canada |
| Europe | MEDEA Awards | European Commission | Innovation and good practice in the use of media in education |
| France | Franck J. Malina Astronautics Medal | International Astronautical Federation | Educator who has demonstrated excellence in taking the fullest advantage of the resources available to him/her to promote the study of astronautics and related space sciences. |
| Germany | Deutscher Lehrerpreis | Vodafone Foundation and German Philological Association | Teachers who exhibit innovative teaching practices, or responsible student-teacher collaboration |
| INDIA | National School Awards (India) | National School Awards Foundation | The Best Schools & Educators including School Principals/Directors/Chairpersons/Teachers working in Non-Governmental/Government Primary, Middle and Secondary Schools in India. |
| India | National Award for Teachers (India) | President of India | Meritorious teachers working in primary, middle and secondary schools in India |
| Soviet Union | People's Teacher of the USSR | Supreme Soviet | Worthwhile contributions to the national education system and mainly in teaching communism to children and young people |
| United Arab Emirates | Khalifa Award for Education | President of the United Arab Emirates | Those working in the field of education in the UAE and in the Arab world |
| United Arab Emirates | Sharjah Award for Educational Excellence | H.H Shaikh Dr. Sultan Al Qasemi, Ruler of Sharjah | Those working, teaching, leaning in the education field in the UAE |

== See also ==
- Teacher award
- Lists of awards
- List of academic awards
- List of international literacy prizes
- List of science communication awards
- List of student awards
- Category:Scholarships
