= Lists of science and technology awards =

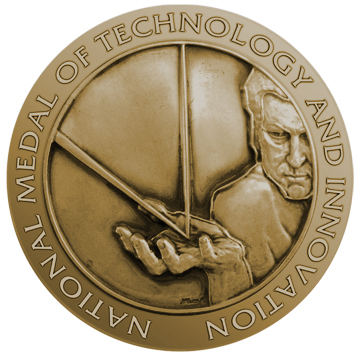
The American National Medal of Technology and Innovation

This is a list of notable awards for specific areas of science and technology. Typically these lists give the country of the sponsoring organization, the award name, sponsor name and a description of the award criteria. Some of the awards have broad scope, or cover the intersection of different disciplines, so an award may appear in more than one list. A list of general awards for science and technology is followed by the lists of more specific awards.

== General list ==
- List of general science and technology awards

== Specific lists ==
- List of academic awards
- List of agriculture awards
- List of archaeology awards
- List of astronomy awards
- List of aviation awards
- List of biochemistry awards
- List of biology awards
- List of biomedical science awards
- List of chemistry awards
- List of computer science awards
- List of computer-related awards
- List of earth sciences awards
- List of economics awards
- List of education awards
- List of engineering awards
- List of environmental awards
- List of geography awards
- List of geology awards
- List of geophysics awards
- List of mathematics awards
- List of mechanical engineering awards
- List of medicine awards
- List of meteorology awards
- List of motor vehicle awards
- List of oceanography awards
- List of ornithology awards
- List of paleontology awards
- List of physics awards
- List of psychology awards
- List of science and technology awards for women
- List of social sciences awards
- List of student awards
- List of space technology awards
- List of student science award programs

== Research ==
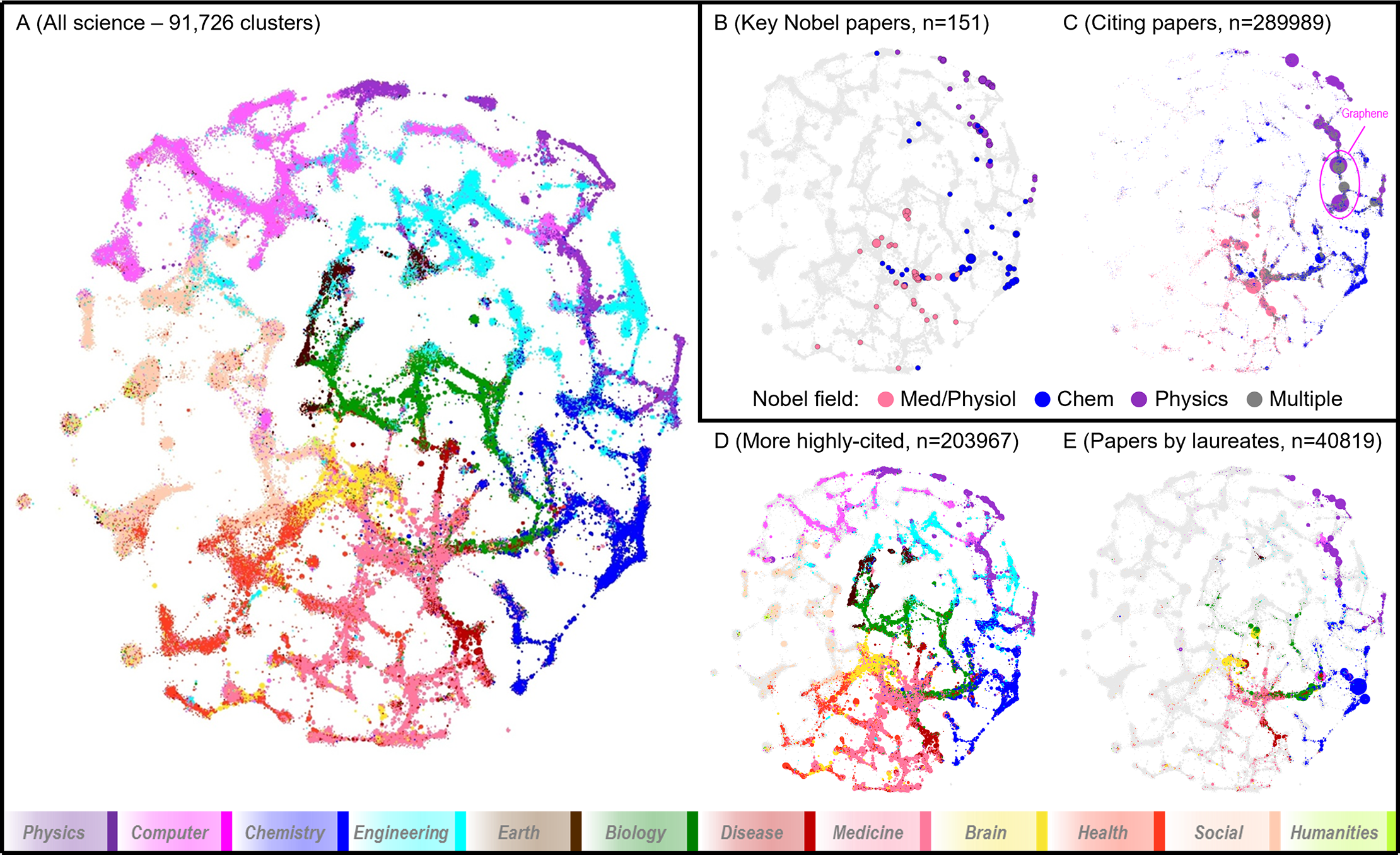
Cluster network of scientific publications in relation to Nobel Prizes

In July 2020, scientists reported that work honored by Nobel Prizes clusters in only a few scientific fields, with only 36/71 having received at least one Nobel Prize of the 114/849 domains that science could be divided into, according to their DC2 and DC3 classification systems. Five of the 114 domains were shown to make up over half of the Nobel Prizes awarded from 1995 to 2017 (particle physics [14%], cell biology [12.1%], atomic physics [10.9%], neuroscience [10.1%], molecular chemistry [5.3%]).

== See also ==
- Lists of awards
- List of writing awards § Science writing awards
- List of years in science
- List of science communication awards
