= List of student awards =

This list of student awards is an index to articles that describe notable awards given to students.

== General ==
Country	Award	Sponsor	Description
International	RIBA President's Medals	Royal Institute of British Architects	Established in 1836 when the first RIBA Silver Medal was awarded, these are widely regarded as the most prestigious awards in architectural education in the world.
United States	ACM Student Research Competition	Association for Computing Machinery	Slide presentation at ACM conference. Undergraduate and graduate categories based on knowledge, contribution, and quality of presentation
United States	Bridge Medal	San Francisco Public Schools	Silver medal that was awarded to the top male graduates of San Francisco grammar schools. Sister prize to the Denman Medal. Awarded from 1879 to 1915.
United States	Denman Medal	San Francisco Public Schools	Silver medal that was awarded to the top graduates of the all-female Denman Grammar School. Sister prize to the Bridge Medal. Awarded from 1865 to 1915.
United States, Canada	Advanced Placement Awards	College Board	Students who have performed exceptionally well on AP examinations
Australia	Australian Student Prize	Government of Australia	National recognition to academic excellence and achievement in secondary education The prize is no longer awarded as of 2015.
Australia	Beazley Medal	School Curriculum and Standards Authority	Top Tertiary Entrance Exam student and top vocational education and training (VET) student
Mongolia	Best Student of Mongolia award	Ministry of Education Culture and Science of Mongolia etc.	Best Student of the year
United Kingdom	Carpenter Medal	University of London	Thesis of exceptional distinction in statistical, genetic, comparative or experimental psychology
United Kingdom	Curriers' Company London History Essay Prize	Worshipful Company of Curriers	Postgraduate essay prize on the history of London
Canada	CHL Scholastic Player of the Year	Canadian Hockey League	Canadian Hockey League player who best combines success on the ice with success in school
United States and Canada	Critics and Awards Program for High School Students	local schools	For high school theater and journalism students and teenage playwrights. Reviews that are later published by area newspapers
United Kingdom	Guardian Student Media Award	The Guardian	Best student articles in various categories
Hong Kong	Hong Kong Outstanding Students Awards	Youth Arch Foundation	About ten secondary school students from local and international schools in Hong Kong
United States	Hotchkiss Scholar	Lake Forest Graduate School of Management	Outstanding academic achievement and demonstrated commitment to the spirit of excellence
Japan	Japan Academy Prize (academics)	Japan Academy	Academic theses, books, and achievements
United States	Machtey Award	Symposium on Foundations of Computer Science	Author(s) of the best student paper(s)
United States	Miriam Braverman Memorial Prize	Progressive Librarians Guild	Best graduate student paper about some aspect of the social responsibilities of librarians, libraries, or librarianship
United States	Morgan Prize	American Mathematical Society et al.	Undergraduate student in the US, Canada, or Mexico who demonstrates superior mathematics research
United States	National Pacemaker Awards	National Scholastic Press Association, Associated Collegiate Press	Excellence in American student journalism
United Kingdom	National Student Journalism Awards	National Union of Students	Students send their best three articles from the past academic year to be critiqued by a panel of senior national journalists.
Ireland	National Student Media Awards	Oxygen.ie website	Annual All-Ireland student journalism competition The awards have been labelled "Ireland's premier student awards".
United States	NCAA Sportsmanship Award	National Collegiate Athletic Association	Men and women in the NCAA who have demonstrated one or more of the ideals of sportsmanship, including fairness, civility, honesty, respect and responsibility.
United States	Wayne B. Nottingham Prize	Physical Electronics Conference	Best student paper
United States	Presidential Scholars Program	United States Department of Education	Graduating seniors for their accomplishments in academic success, leadership, and service to school and community
	Prudential Spirit of Community Award		
	Royal College, Colombo#Awards		
	Samuel Goldwyn Writing Awards		
	The Science, Engineering & Technology Student of the Year Awards		
	Selma Jeanne Cohen Award		
	Silver Anniversary Awards		
	South Australian Scholarship		
	Student Academy Awards		
	Student Peace Prize		
	Student Peace Prize Secretariat		
	Sub auspiciis Praesidentis		
	SUNY Chancellor's Award for Student Excellence		
	The Undergraduate Awards		
	Van Amringe Mathematical Prize		
	William C. Carter Award		
	Young American Award		

== University of Oxford ==
The University of Oxford is a collegiate research university in the city of Oxford, England, the oldest university in the English-speaking world.

Award	Named for	Description
Boden Scholarship	Lt-Col. Joseph Boden (1763–1811)	For the encouragement of the study of, and proficiency in, the Sanskrit Language and Literature
Bodley Medal	Thomas Bodley (1545–1613)	Outstanding contributions ... to the worlds of communications and literature
Clarendon Fund	Edward Hyde, 1st Earl of Clarendon (1609–1674)	University graduates from around the world and from across all subject areas, who demonstrate academic excellence and potential
Conington Prize	John Conington (1825–1869)	Cash prize for a dissertation on ancient history, religion, art, and archaeology, or ancient philosophy and ideas, or classical literature, textual criticism, and philology
Eldon Law Scholarship	John Scott, 1st Earl of Eldon (1751–1838)	Students from the University of Oxford who wish to study for the English Bar
Gaisford Prize	Thomas Gaisford (1779–1855)	For classical Greek verse and prose
Henry Fellowship	Sir Charles Henry (1860–1919)	Two post-graduate students from any British university are funded to study in the US (one at Harvard and one at Yale), and two American post-graduate students from Harvard and Yale are funded to study at Cambridge and Oxford.
Hetherington Prize	Mark G. Hetherington	Best doctoral thesis presentation in the Department of Materials
Humanitas Programme		Visiting professorships at the universities of Oxford and Cambridge to address major themes in the arts, social sciences, and humanities
Jardine Scholarship	Jardine Matheson	Develop future leaders, who would give back to the societies in which [Jardine Matheson] operates
Neda Agha-Soltan Graduate Scholarship	Neda Agha-Soltan (1983–2009)	Post-graduate philosophy students at The Queen's College, Oxford, with preference given to students of Iranian citizenship or heritage
Newdigate Prize	Sir Roger Newdigate (1719–1806)	Best composition in English verse by an undergraduate
Norway Scholarship		Awarded in Norway. Norway Scholars receive funding for one or two years of study and research at Oxford.
Oxford-Weidenfeld Translation Prize	George, Baron Weidenfeld (1919–2016)	Any book-length translation into English from any other living European language
Rhodes Scholarship	Cecil Rhodes (1853–1902)	International postgraduate award for students to study at the University of Oxford
Snell Exhibition	Sir John Snell (1629–1679)	Students of the University of Glasgow to allow them to undertake postgraduate study at Balliol College, Oxford
Stanhope essay prize	Philip, 5th Earl Stanhope (1805–1875)	Undergraduate history essay prize created at Balliol College
Vinerian Scholarship	Charles Viner (1678–1756)	To the University of Oxford student who gives the best performance in the examination for the degree of Bachelor of Civil Law
Weldon Memorial Prize	Raphael Weldon (1860–1906)	To the person who has published the most noteworthy contribution to the development of mathematical or statistical methods applied to problems in Biology
Zaharoff Travelling Scholarship	Sir Basil Zaharoff (1849–1936)	Prize for Oxford Modern Languages graduates in French

== See also ==
- Lists of awards
- Category:Student athlete awards in the United States
