= List of international literacy prizes =

This list of international literacy prizes is an index to articles about notable international prizes for promoting literacy. They are awarded by UNESCO and other organizations.

Prize	Sponsor	Notes	Period
Nadezhda K. Krupskaya literacy prize	UNESCO	Sponsored by the government of the Soviet Union	1970 - 1992
ILA literacy awards	International Literacy Association	Various categories	1979 - Present
Noma Literacy Prize	UNESCO	Noma Prize for group or individual who has done most to combat illiteracy	1980 - Present
King Sejong Literacy Prize	UNESCO	For institutions, organizations or individuals for their contribution to the fight against illiteracy	1989 - Present
The Malcolm Adiseshiah International Literacy Prize	UNESCO	Organizations or individuals displaying outstanding merit and achieving particularly effective results in contributing to the fight for literacy	1998 - Present
Confucius Prize for Literacy	UNESCO	Outstanding individuals, governments or governmental agencies and NGOs working in literacy serving rural adults and out-of-school youth, particularly women and girls	2005 - Present

== See also ==
- List of education awards
