= List of computer science awards =

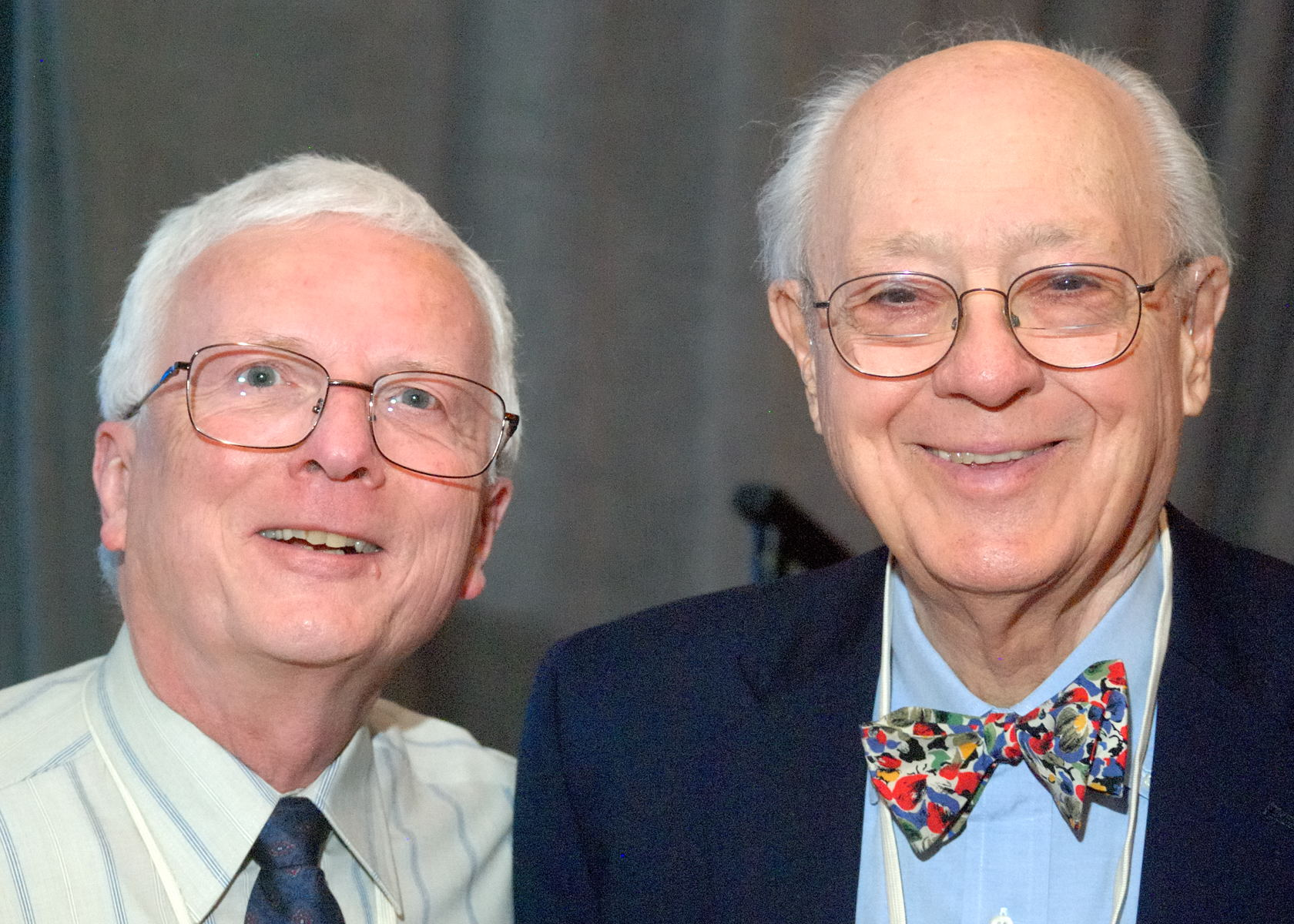
Dennis Hamilton and Charles Bachman at ACM Turing Centenary Celebration

This list of computer science awards is an index to articles on notable awards related to computer science. It includes lists of awards by the Association for Computing Machinery, the Institute of Electrical and Electronics Engineers, other computer science and information science awards, and a list of computer science competitions.

The top computer science award is the ACM Turing Award, generally regarded as the Nobel Prize equivalent for Computer Science. Other highly regarded top computer science awards include IEEE John von Neumann Medal awarded by the IEEE Board of Directors, and the Japan Kyoto Prize for Information Science.

== Association for Computing Machinery ==
The Association for Computing Machinery (ACM) gives out many computer science awards, often run by one of their Special Interest Groups.

Award	SIG	Notes
Alan D. Berenbaum Distinguished Service Award	SIGARCH	Important service to the computer architecture community
Alonzo Church Award	SIGLOG	Outstanding Contributions to Logic and Computation
CHI Academy	SIGCHI	Advancement of the field of human-computer interaction
Danny Lewin Best Student Paper Award	SIGACT	Best student-authored paper in Symposium on Theory of Computing
Dijkstra Prize	PODC	Co-sponsor: International Symposium on Distributed Computing. For outstanding papers on the principles of distributed computing
Doctoral Dissertation Award		Best doctoral dissertations in computer science and computer engineering
Eckert–Mauchly Award		Co-sponsor: IEEE Computer Society. Contributions to computer and digital systems architecture
Edgar F. Codd Innovations Award	SIGMOD	Innovative and highly significant contributions of enduring value to the development, understanding, or use of database systems and databases
Eugene L. Lawler Award		Significant contribution to the use of information technology for humanitarian purposes
Gerard Salton Award	SIGIR	Significant, sustained and continuing contributions to research in information retrieval
Gödel Prize	SIGACT	Co-sponsor: European Association for Theoretical Computer Science. For outstanding papers in the area of theoretical computer science
Gordon Bell Prize		Outstanding achievement in high-performance computing applications
Grace Murray Hopper Award		Computer professional who makes a single, significant technical or service contribution at or before age 35
Ken Kennedy Award		Co-sponsored by IEEE Computer Society. For substantial contributions to programmability and productivity in computing and substantial community service or mentoring contributions
Knuth Prize	SIGACT	Co-sponsored by IEEE Computer Society. For outstanding contributions to the foundations of computer science
Mark Weiser Award	SIGOPS	Creativity and innovation in operating system research
Maurice Wilkes Award	SIGARCH	Outstanding contribution to computer architecture
Paris Kanellakis Award		Specific theoretical accomplishments that have had a significant and demonstrable effect on the practice of computing
Penny Crane Award for Distinguished Service	SIGUCCS	Significant contributions to the Special Interest Group, and to computing in higher education
Prize in Computing		Early to mid-career innovative contributions in computing
Programming Languages Software Award	SIGPLAN	Programming Languages Software
Programming Systems and Languages Paper Award		Replaced in 1983 by the ACM Software System Award
SIGCOMM Award	SIGCOMM	Lifetime contribution to the field of communication networks
SIGUCCS Hall of Fame Award	SIGUCCS	Contributions that have had a positive impact on the ACM SIGUCCS organization
Software System Award		Software system that has had a lasting influence, reflected in contributions to concepts, in commercial acceptance, or both
Steven A. Coons Award	SIGGRAPH	Outstanding Creative Contributions to Computer Graphics
SPAA Parallel Computing Award	SPAA	Singular important result or a career of accomplishments related to the ACM-SPAA community
Turing Award		Contributions of lasting and major technical importance to the computer field

== IEEE ==
A number of awards are given by the Institute of Electrical and Electronics Engineers (IEEE), the IEEE Computer Society or the IEEE Information Theory Society.

Award	Sponsor	Notes
Charles Babbage Award	IEEE Computer Society	Significant contributions in the field of parallel computing
Claude E. Shannon Award	IEEE Information Theory Society	Consistent and profound contributions to the field of information theory
Computer Pioneer Award	IEEE Computer Society	Those whose efforts resulted in the creation and continued vitality of the computer industry
Harlan D. Mills Award	IEEE Computer Society	Contributions to the theory and practice of the information sciences, [focused on] software engineering
Harry H. Goode Memorial Award	IEEE Computer Society	Achievements in the information processing field which are considered either a single contribution of theory, design, or technique of outstanding significance, or the accumulation of important contributions on theory or practice over an extended time period
Internet Award	IEEE, Nokia	Exceptional contributions to the advancement of Internet technology for network architecture, mobility and/or end-use applications
John von Neumann Medal	IEEE	Outstanding achievements in computer-related science and technology
Kleene Award	IEEE Symposium on Logic in Computer Science	Best student paper
Machtey Award	IEEE Symposium on Foundations of Computer Science	Best student paper
Reynold B. Johnson Information Storage Systems Award	IEEE	Outstanding contributions to information storage systems
Richard W. Hamming Medal	IEEE, Qualcomm	Outstanding achievements in information sciences, information systems and information technology
Seymour Cray Computer Engineering Award	IEEE Computer Society	Significant and innovative contributions in the field of high-performance computing
Sidney Fernbach Award	IEEE Computer Society	Outstanding contributions in the application of high performance computers using innovative approaches
Test-of-Time Award	IEEE Symposium on Logic in Computer Science	Papers from LICS twenty years earlier that stood the "test of time"
W. Wallace McDowell Award	IEEE Computer Society	Outstanding recent theoretical, design, educational, practical, or other similar innovative contributions that fall within the scope of Computer Society interest
William C. Carter Award	IEEE Technical Committee on Fault-Tolerant Computing and IFIP Working Group on Dependable Computing and Fault Tolerance	Significant contribution to the field of dependable and secure computing throughout his or her PhD dissertation

== Other computer science awards ==
Country	Award	Sponsor	Notes
United States	ACM-AAAI Allen Newell Award	Association for the Advancement of Artificial Intelligence	Career contributions that have breadth within computer science, or that bridge computer science and other disciplines
Europe	Ackermann Award	European Association for Computer Science Logic	Outstanding Dissertation Award for Logic in Computer Science
International	Azriel Rosenfeld Award	International Conference on Computer Vision (Institute of Electrical and Electronics Engineers)	Significant contributions to the field of Computer Vision over longtime careers
United States	Barwise Prize	American Philosophical Association	Significant and sustained contributions to areas relevant to philosophy and computing
United Kingdom	BCS Lovelace Medal	British Computer Society	Individuals who have made outstanding contributions to the understanding or advancement of computing
United Kingdom	Charles Babbage Premium	Institution of Electrical Engineers	Authors of an outstanding paper on the design or use of electronic computers
Europe	Dahl–Nygaard Prize	European Conference on Object-Oriented Programming	Senior researcher with outstanding career contributions and a younger researcher who has demonstrated great potential
United Kingdom	Digital Preservation Award	Digital Preservation Coalition	New initiatives in the challenging field of digital preservation
Europe	EATCS Award	European Association for Theoretical Computer Science	Distinguished career in theoretical computer science
International	Edison Award	Edison Awards	Honoring excellence in innovation
Europe	ERCIM Cor Baayen Award	European Research Consortium for Informatics and Mathematics	Researcher in computer science and applied mathematics
United States	Erdős–Rényi Prize	Network Science Society	Outstanding early-career researcher in the field of network science
Germany	Heinz Billing Prize	Heinz Billing Foundation of the Max Planck Society	Those who have spent time and effort developing the hardware and software crucial for scientific advances
United States	Herbrand Award	Conference on Automated Deduction	Important contributions to the field of automated deduction
United Kingdom	IET Mountbatten Medal	Institution of Engineering and Technology and Institution of Electrical Engineers	Outstanding contribution, or contributions over a period, to the promotion of electronics or information technology and their application
International	IJCAI Award for Research Excellence	International Joint Conference on Artificial Intelligence	Researcher in artificial intelligence as a recognition of excellence of their career
International	IJCAI Computers and Thought Award	International Joint Conference on Artificial Intelligence	Outstanding young scientists in artificial intelligence
India	Infosys Prize	Infosys Science Foundation	Outstanding achievements of contemporary researchers and scientists across six categories, including Engineering and Computer Sciences
United States	Intel Hardware Security Academic Award	Intel	Recently published academic papers with a significant impact on the hardware security ecosystem
Canada	J. W. Graham Medal	University of Waterloo Faculty of Mathematics	Leadership and many innovative contributions made to the University of Waterloo, and to the Canadian computer industry
United States	Jonathan B. Postel Service Award	Internet Society	honor a person who has made outstanding contributions in service to the data communications community
Netherlands	Kalai Prize	Game Theory Society	Outstanding articles at the interface of game theory and computer science
Germany	Konrad Zuse Medal	Gesellschaft für Informatik	Leading German computer scientist
International	Levchin Prize	International Association for Cryptologic Research	Cryptographic innovation with real-world impact
United Kingdom	Loebner Prize	Society for the Study of Artificial Intelligence and the Simulation of Behaviour	Computer programs considered by the judges to be the most human-like
Europe	Microsoft Award	Royal Society, French Academy of Sciences	Scientists working in Europe who had made a major contribution to the advancement of science through the use of computational methods
Europe	Milner Award	Microsoft Research	(replaces Microsoft Award) Outstanding achievement in computer science by a European researcher
Europe	Nerode Prize	European Association for Theoretical Computer Science, European Symposium on Algorithms	Outstanding research in the area of multivariate algorithmics
Brazil	Newton Faller Award	Brazilian Computer Society	Members who have distinguished themselves throughout their lives for services to the Brazilian Computer Society
International	IMU Abacus Medal (Nevanlinna Prize)	International Congress of Mathematicians	Outstanding contributions in Mathematical Aspects of Information Sciences
United States	O'Reilly Open Source Award	O'Reilly Media	Individuals recognized for dedication, innovation, leadership and outstanding contribution to open source
Italy	Pirelli Internetional Award	Pirelli	Best multimedia presentations focussing on themes involving the diffusion of science and technology
Europe	Presburger Award	European Association for Theoretical Computer Science	Young scientist for outstanding contributions in theoretical computer science
Europe	Prize for Innovation in Distributed Computing	International Colloquium on Structural Information and Communication Complexity	Major contribution to understanding the relationships between information and efficiency in decentralized computing
United Kingdom	Roger Needham Award	British Computer Society	Distinguished research contribution in computer science by a UK-based researcher
International	RSA Award for Excellence in Mathematics	RSA Conference	Outstanding achievements in cryptographic research defined broadly, including related mathematics
United States	Sloan Research Fellowship	Alfred P. Sloan Foundation	Provide support and recognition to early-career scientists and scholars
International	Stevens Award	Reengineering Forum	Outstanding contributions to the literature or practice of methods for software and systems development
United Kingdom	Tony Kent Strix award	International Society for Knowledge Organisation UK, Royal Society of Chemistry and British Computer Society	Outstanding contribution to the field of information retrieval
Japan	Tsutomu Kanai Award	Hitachi	Major contributions to the state-of-the-art distributed computing systems and their applications
United States	Tucker Prize	Mathematical Optimization Society	Outstanding theses in the area of optimization
United Kingdom	Weizenbaum Award	International Society for Ethics and Information Technology	Significant contribution to the field of information and computer ethics
United States	White Camel award	Perl Foundation	Important contributors to the Perl Programming Language community
Netherlands	Van Wijngaarden Award	Centrum Wiskunde & Informatica	Mathematics and Computer Science
United States	J. H. Wilkinson Prize for Numerical Software	Society for Industrial and Applied Mathematics	Outstanding contributions in the field of numerical software
United States	James H. Wilkinson Prize in Numerical Analysis and Scientific Computing	Society for Industrial and Applied Mathematics	Research in, or other contributions to, numerical analysis and scientific computing
International	Karen Spärck Jones Award	BCS, its Information Retrieval Specialist Group (BCS IRSG) and Microsoft Research	An award to commemorate the achievements of Karen Spärck Jones and her impactful research the fields of information retrieval and NLP.

== Information science awards ==
Country	Award	Sponsor	Notes
Hong Kong	Hong Kong ICT Awards	Innovation and Technology Bureau	Information and communication technologies startup companies and solutions
Canada	J. W. Graham Medal	University of Waterloo Faculty of Mathematics	Leadership and many innovative contributions to the University of Waterloo, and to the Canadian computer industry
Japan	Kyoto Prize in Advanced Technology	Inamori Foundation	Electronics / Biotechnology and Medical Technology / Materials Science and Engineering / Information Science
Chile	National Prize for Exact Sciences	Ministry of Education	E.g. nanoscience and nanotechnology
Ireland	O'Moore Medal	Healthcare Informatics Society	Major contribution to healthcare informatics
United States	Patterson-Crane Award	American Chemical Society	Contributions to chemical information
United States	Herman Skolnik Award	American Chemical Society	Outstanding contributions to and achievements in the theory and practice of chemical information science
International	Weizenbaum Award	International Society for Ethics and Information Technology	Individual who has made significant contributions to the field of information and computer ethics

== Competitions ==
Country	Award	Sponsor	Notes
Australia	Hutter Prize	Marcus Hutter	Data compression improvements on a specific 1 GB English text file
Canada	AI Challenge	University of Waterloo Computer Science Club	Artificial intelligence programming
United States	American Computer Science League	ACSL	Programming
United States	Arimaa Challenge	Arimaa / Omar Syed	Artificial intelligence programming (game play versus humans)
Sweden	CADE ATP System Competition	Association for Automated Reasoning	Fully automated theorem provers for classical logic
United States	World Computer-Bridge Championship	American Contract Bridge League	Contract bridge using computer software
United Kingdom	Cyber Centurion	Cyber Security Challenge UK	Cyber security competition for school children,
United States	CyberPatriot	Air Force Association	National Youth Cyber Defense Competition for high school and middle school students
United States	DARPA Network Challenge	DARPA	Internet and social networking competition
United States	DARPA Shredder Challenge 2011	DARPA	Competition for methods to reconstruct documents shredded by a variety of paper shredding techniques
Poland	Deadline24	Tomasz Łakota and Mateusz Brzeszcz	Programming
United States	Halite AI Programming Competition	Two Sigma, Cornell Tech	Open-source computer programming contest
United States	ImageNet Large Scale Visual Recognition Challenge	ImageNet	Software programs compete to classify and detect objects and scenes
International	International Olympiad in Informatics	UNESCO and IFIP	School competition
United Kingdom	Loebner Prize	Society for the Study of Artificial Intelligence and the Simulation of Behaviour	Computer programs considered by the judges to be the most human-like
United States	National Collegiate Cyber Defense Competition	University of Texas at San Antonio	College-level cyber defense competition
United States	Netflix Prize	Netflix	Best collaborative filtering algorithm to predict user ratings for films
United States	Outreachy	Software Freedom Conservancy	Three-month paid internships with free and open-source software projects
United States	Password Hashing Competition	Jean-Philippe Aumasson	Competition to select one or more password hash functions
United Kingdom	Project Euler	Colin Hughes	Computational problems intended to be solved with computer programs
United States	SemEval	Association for Computational Linguistics SIGLEX	Evaluations of computational semantic analysis systems
United States	Text Retrieval Conference	National Institute of Standards and Technology, Intelligence Advanced Research Projects Activity	Information retrieval research areas
Australia	UAV Outback Challenge	Australian Research Centre for Aerospace Automation	Competition for the development of unmanned aerial vehicles
United States	University Voting Systems Competition	National Science Foundation etc.	Students design, implement, and demonstrate open-source election systems

== See also ==
- Competitive programming
- Lists of awards
- Lists of science and technology awards
- List of computer-related awards
- List of engineering awards
