= Francis Aveling =

Canadian psychologist and Catholic priest

Francis Arthur Powell Aveling
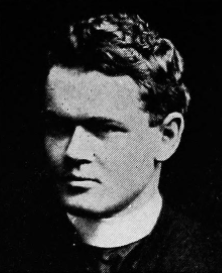
- Born: 25 December 1875; St. Catharines, Ontario
- Died: 6 March 1941 (aged 65)
- Education: McGill University; University of Oxford; Pontificio Collegio Canadese; University of Louvain
- Occupation: psychologist
- Notable work: On the Consciousness of the Universal and the Individual: A Contribution to the Phenomenology of the Thought Process (1912)
- Spouse: Ethel Dancy

Francis Arthur Powell Aveling MC ComC (25 December 1875 – 6 March 1941) was a Canadian psychologist and Catholic priest. He married Ethel Dancy of Steyning, Sussex in 1925.

== Life ==
Francis Aveling was born at St. Catharines, Ontario 25 December 1875. He went to Bishop Ridley College in Ontario and McGill University before studying at Keble College at the University of Oxford, England. Aveling was received into the Roman Catholic Church by Father Luke Rivington in 1896 and entered the Pontificio Collegio Canadese in Rome. There he earned his doctor of divinity degree. He was ordained to the priesthood in 1899, and served as a curate in Tottenham, before becoming first rector of Westminster Cathedral Choir School. He was also a chaplain at the Cathedral, and to St. Wilfrid's Convent, Chelsea.

In 1910, Aveling obtained a doctor of philosophy degree at the age of 35 from the University of Louvain (his advisor was Albert Michotte), and in 1912 he was recipient of a doctor of science degree from the University of London, and received the Carpenter Medal following his work On the Consciousness of the Universal and the Individual: A Contribution to the Phenomenology of the Thought Process. Subsequently, Aveling received his doctor of letters degree from the University of London.

== Career ==
Aveling taught at University College, London from 1912 as a Lecturer (Assistant Professor), under the leadership of Charles Spearman, until the First World War. During that war he served in France as a chaplain in the British Army, after which he returned to the University of London. In 1922, he transferred to King's College, London where he was promoted to reader (associate professor), and later to professor of psychology. He was an extern examiner in philosophy at the National University of Ireland; and a lecturer in pedagogical methods for the London County Council.

Aveling authored several books. He was the doctoral advisor of Raymond Cattell From 1926 until 1929, Aveling was also a president of the British Psychological Society. Aveling was a member of the Council of the International Congresses, of the Aristotelian Society, of the council and advisory board of the National Institute of Industrial Psychology, of the council of the British Institute of Philosophical Studies and of the Child Guidance Council.

He was a contributor to the Dublin Review, The American Catholic Quarterly Review, Catholic World, The nineteenth Century, The Journal of Psychology, and the Catholic Encyclopedia.

== Works ==
- Aveling, Francis (1905). Immortality of the Soul: Westminster Lectures, ed. by F. Aveling. Sands & Co., St. Louis.
- Science and faith. Sands. 1906.
- Aveling, Francis (1906). The God of philosophy. London, Sands.
- Aveling, Francis (1912). On the consciousness of the universal and the individual, a contribution to the phenomenology of the thought processes. London, Macmillan.
- Aveling, Francis (1932). An introduction to psychology. London : Victor Gollancz.
- Morris, Charles W. (1 July 1932). "Personality and Will. Francis Aveling". American Journal of Sociology. 38 (1): 149–150. doi:10.1086/215999. ISSN 0002-9602.
- Aveling, Francis (26 February 2019). The Philosophers of the Smoking -Room. Creative Media Partners, LLC. ISBN 978-0-469-89066-4.
- Arnoul: The Englishman. Kessinger Publishing. 10 September 2010. p. 426. ISBN 978-1164042655.
