= BookScouter.com =

Price comparison website

- Website type: Comparison shopping website
- Founded: 2007; 19 years ago
- Headquarters: Wilmington, Delaware 39.739071°N 75.539787°W
- Country of origin: United States
- Owner: BOOKSCOUTER LLC
- Founder: Brandon Checketts
- Industry: Internet, Comparison Shopping, E-commerce
- Products: books, used books, textbooks
- Services: Online shopping
- Website: bookscouter.com
- Commercial: Yes
- Launched: August 6, 2007
- Current status: Active
- Written in: PHP

BookScouter.com is a comparison shopping website that helps buy, sell, and rent textbooks and used books online. The website compares offers and prices from 30 booksellers and buyback vendors in the US, and suggests the most fitting place to purchase or sell a given book. The website is mainly used by college students.

== History ==
BookScouter was founded in 2007 by Brandon Checketts. Checketts developed this price-comparison website to help students and recent graduates sell their used college books. He first came up with this idea when he heard about how his wife's friend was selling her old college books to pay off her student loans. Checketts created a working prototype that simplified and expedited the process by comparing prices from seven vendors at a time. The project was well-received, and Checketts kept growing it as a business.

== Business model ==
BookScouter's price comparison engine aggregates data from partnering vendors and their offers on a single book, identified by its unique ISBN. BookScouter neither buys books directly from sellers nor sets the prices. All the offers available on the website are set by vendors.

BookScouter.com is an Amazon associate and earns commissions from qualifying purchases. The platform also offers Pro Tools for high-volume booksellers on a monthly subscription basis. Pro Tools include bulk ISBN lookup, deals finder, historical price lookup, and recently searched high-value books identifier.

=== Vendors and bookstores ===
BookScouter compares prices from AbeBooks, Amazon.com, ValoreBooks.com, Chegg.com, Powells.com, Booksrun.com, and other vendors and bookstores.

== Mobile ==
BookScouter App, available on iOS and Android, helps scan ISBNs quickly and check prices for used books from multiple vendors. The app is popular among small book businesses and independent resellers.

== Other activities ==
BookScouter offers a quarterly scholarship of $500 for any enrolled student in the US. This scholarship should be used towards acquiring textbooks and aims at easing students’ financial expenses.

From 2019 to 2020, BookScouter produced The Studentpreneur Show — a podcast about student-run businesses and startups. In each podcast episode, a guest tells about their experiences of founding and running companies while studying at college.

In 2026, BookScouter partnered with the World Literacy Foundation and enabled an option for sellers to donate their cashback to support the foundation's literacy programs.

== See also ==
- Bookselling
