= Charles Rivington =

English publisher (1688–1742)

- Born: 1688; Chesterfield, Derbyshire, England
- Died: 22 February 1742; St. Paul's Churchyard, London, England
- Education: Apprenticed to Matthews
- Occupation: Publisher
- Spouse: Eleanor Pease
- Children: 13 including James Rivington
- Parent: Thurston Rivington

Charles Rivington (1688 – 22 February 1742) was an English publisher.

== Life ==
The eldest son of Thurston Rivington, Rivington was born at Chesterfield, Derbyshire, in 1688. Coming to London as apprentice to a bookseller, Matthews, he took over in 1711 the publishing business of Richard Chiswell (1639–1711), and, at the sign of the Bible and the Crown in Paternoster Row, he carried on a business almost entirely connected with theological and educational literature. He published one of George Whitefield's earliest works, 'The Nature and Necessity of a new Birth in Christ' (1737) and brought out an edition of The Imitation of Christ. George Whitefield at that time was acknowledged as the leader of Methodism and he was preaching to thousands. He recounts how he was approached by Charles Rivington and had to be persuaded that this was the correct course. Rivington published A General History of the Pyrates in 1724, containing vivid biographies of contemporary English and Welsh pirates.

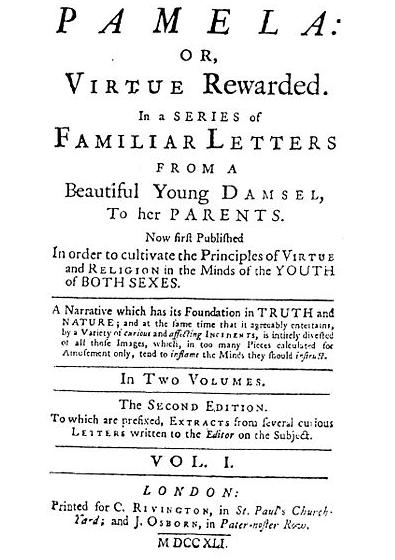
Samuel Richardson's Pamela – at the bottom of the page is the publishers. Samuel, who was also from Derbyshire explains how he too was persuaded by Rivington to submit a novel in letters.

In 1736 Rivington with Bettesworth founded the company of booksellers who called themselves the "New Conger," in rivalry with the older association, the "Conger," dating from about 1700. In 1741 he published the first volume of Samuel Richardson's novel, Pamela.

After his death, Charles Rivington was succeeded by his two sons, John (1720–1792) and James (1724–1802). James emigrated to America, and pursued his trade in New York City; John carried on the business of Rivington and Co. on the lines marked out by his father, and was the great Church of England publisher of the day.

A descendant, Luke Rivington (1838–1899), became an English Roman Catholic priest and prolific Christian writer.

== See also ==
- Rivington (publishers)

== Notes ==
Attribution
