= 3M Teaching Fellow =

The 3M National Teaching Fellowship is conferred by the Society for the Scholarship of Teaching and Learning in Higher Education (STLHE). In 1986, STLHE and 3M Canada partnered to recognize exceptional contributions to teaching and learning in Canadian post-secondary education. Up to ten Fellowships are selected annually. The program was paused in 2026.

All recipients of the 3M National Teaching Fellowship automatically become members of the STHLE Council of Fellows, together with 3M National Student Fellows, and College Sector Educator Award recipients.

== See also ==
- List of education awards
