= Deadline24 =

Programming competition

Deadline24 was an annual programming competition organised by a Polish company for software developers and students from all over the world. The finals of the contest last 24 hours and are held in extreme conditions. It is always organised in the venues closely related to the industrial tradition of the Silesia Province (Poland). Competition tasks are prepared by programmers working at a Gliwice-based company, Future Processing. The marathon was free of charge.

The 10th and final edition of Deadline24 took place at the Silesian Stadium in Chorzów, Poland.

== History ==
First edition of Deadline24 was organised by Tomasz Łakota and Mateusz Brzeszcz, and it first took place in 2009 in Gliwice when it was the only challenge of this type in Poland. In 2013 it became an international competition. Popularity of the competition increased with 1,479 players signed up for the first stage of the competition in 2016 with the qualifying round attended by representatives of: Poland, Germany, Czech Republic, Russia, Ukraine, Hungary, Great Britain, Spain, Slovakia, Estonia, China, Egypt, Indonesia, Nigeria, Brazil, and India.

| Edition | Year | Venue |
|---|---|---|
| 1 | 2009 | Silesian University of Technology |
| 2 | 2010 | Silesian University of Technology |
| 3 | 2011 | Silesian University of Technology |
| 4 | 2012 | Guido Historic Coal Mine in Zabrze |
| 5 | 2013 | Guido Historic Coal Mine in Zabrze |
| 6 | 2014 | “Ludwik” Mine in Zabrze |
| 7 | 2015 | Contemporary Art Gallery “Elektrownia” in Czeladź |
| 8 | 2016 | Muzeum Śląskie in Katowice |
| 9 | 2017 | Muzeum Śląskie in Katowice |
| 10 | 2018 | Silesian Stadium in Chorzów |

== Contest parameters ==
The contest consists of 2 rounds:

1. An elimination round, where entrants have to complete a five-hour challenge via the Deadline24 website.
2. The finals, which lasts 24 consecutive clock hours.

The qualifying round lasts 5 hours and is conducted via the Internet. The teams receive tasks and necessary input data. The objective is to find the solution (in any way) and to transfer it to the verification server within a given time. The best 20–30 teams qualify for the final. The qualifying round is open for all the teams who have registered via Deadline24 website before the registration deadline. The final task of the contest consists of an appropriate interaction with the contest server under the terms and conditions specified in the task. Communication with the server is conducted using TCP/IP protocol. Participants work on their own equipment (the organiser provides one 230 V power outlet and one LAN RJ-45 jack or a plug-in cable for each team) and are allowed to choose any working environment and programming language. They may use any materials and auxiliary devices they bring with them, except for any devices providing access to external support. The access to any external help is strictly forbidden.

=== Comparable competitions ===
Unlike the International Collegiate Programming Contest Deadline24 does not set problems where there is an exact solution.

== Organizer ==
The competition is organised by Future Processing, a software development company from Gliwice, Poland. It operates in the global market and specialises in producing software for industry, international trade, and services.

== See also ==
- List of computer science awards
