= Faculty award =

Faculty awards are given to faculty in recognition of outstanding contributions in research, teaching, and/or service to their university, students, profession, or field.

== See also ==
- Faculty (academic staff)
- Higher education
- University
- List of education awards
