= Room to Read =

U.S.-based international non-profit organization

- Type: Non-profit organization
- Industry: Education
- Founded: 2000
- Headquarters: San Francisco, California, United States
- Key people: Geetha Murali (Chief Executive Officer ) John Wood (Founder); Erin Ganju (Co-Founder); Dinesh Shrestha (Co-Founder and Director of Field Operations)
- Revenue: $64.7 million (2023)
- Total assets: 25,725,235 United States dollar (2011)
- Website: www.roomtoread.org

Room to Read is a global non-profit organization headquartered in San Francisco, California. The organization focuses on working in collaboration with local communities, partner organizations and governments to improve literacy and gender equality in education.

Room to Read has reached 50 million children and has worked in 28 countries.

== History ==
Room to Read was co-founded and launched by John Wood, Erin Keown Ganju and Dinesh Shrestha in 1999 after Wood visited several local schools in Nepal. He observed the teachers' and students' enthusiasm and lack of resources, which led him to quit his job and build a global team to create sustainable programs that help solve their education challenges.

Wood and Shrestha worked with rural communities to build schools called School Room and established libraries called Reading Room. They later expanded beyond libraries, to begin the Girls' Education program in 2000, which focuses on young girls and provides a long-term commitment to their education.

In 2001, Ganju launched Room to Read in Vietnam.

Geetha Murali joined Room to Read in 2009 as a manager and was appointed chief executive officer in 2018.

In December 2021, John Wood stepped down from the global board of directors of Room to Read.

In 2024, the writer Jacinta Kerketta turned down the Room to Read Young Author award; she said this was because of Room to Read's ties to Boeing.

== Programs ==
Room to Read implements literacy programs aimed at developing reading skills and fostering an interest in reading among children. Its gender equality programs focus on supporting adolescents, particularly girls, in building life skills that promote gender equality. The organization delivers and scales its programs both directly and through partnerships, with core areas of focus including curriculum and content development, educator training and coaching, delivery systems, and research and evaluation.

== Impact ==
As of 2024, Room to Read had reached more than 50 million children across 28 countries.

== Awards and recognition ==
- Skoll Foundation: Award for Social Entrepreneurship (2004–2013)
- Fast Company / Monitor Group: Social Capitalist Award (2004–2008)
- Charity Navigator: 14 four-star ratings (2005–2017, 2019)
- Academy for Educational Development: Breakthrough Ideas in Education (2007)
- American Library Association: Presidential Citation (2008)
- UNESCO Confucius Prize for Literacy: 2011
- Cambodia Ministry of Education: Royal Medal of Munisaraphorn Mahasereaywat (2013)
- World's Children's Prize, Honorary Award Laureate (2014)
- American University School of International Service: Ten Innovative NGOs in Education (2014)
- Library of Congress Literacy Award: Special Response Award (2020); David M. Rubenstein Prize (2014)
- OnCon Icon Awards: Top 10 Finance Team (2023)
- UNESCO Prize for Girls' and Women's Education
- HundrED's Global Collection: Hall of Fame (2025), Academy Choice Award (2023) and Top 100 Global Collection (2023-2025)
