= John Wood (activist) =

American activist (born 1964)

- Born: 1963 or 1964 (age 61–62); Connecticut, U.S.
- Education: University of Colorado Boulder; Northwestern University (MBA)
- Organization(s): Room to Read; U-Go

John J. Wood (born 1963 or 1964) is an American activist. In 2000, Wood founded the global literacy and education charity Room to Read. In 2021, Wood founded the nonprofit U-Go to fund women's postsecondary education.

== Early life ==
John Wood was born in 1963 or 1964. He spent his childhood in Connecticut and Athens, Pennsylvania. He graduated from the Leeds School of Business at the University of Colorado Boulder in 1986 and graduated with a Master of Business Administration from the Kellogg School of Management in 1989. After a "stint" in commercial banking, Wood worked for Microsoft. His last position in 1999 was Greater China director of business development.

== Room to Read ==
In 1998, Wood took a vacation from his work at Microsoft to trek through the Himalayas. In Nepal, he found that many primary schools did not have the resources for books. Wood solicited 3,000 books donated from friends and family, and delivered them back to Nepal.

In 2000, Wood founded Room to Read and worked full-time to promote literacy and fund primary education.

Wood published two autobiographies about his work with Room to Read: Leaving Microsoft to Change the World: An Entrepreneur's Odyssey to Educate the World's Children in 2006, and Creating Room to Read: A Story of Hope in the Battle for Global Literacy in 2013.

== U-Go ==
In 2021, Wood left Room to Read to found U-Go, a nonprofit dedicated to funding women's postsecondary education in nine low-income countries. According to the organization, U-Go funded scholarships for 5,900 awardees by the end of 2025.

== Published works ==
- Leaving Microsoft to Change the World: An Entrepreneur's Odyssey to Educate the World's Children. (HarperCollins, 2006) ISBN 978-0061835520
- Creating Room to Read: A Story of Hope in the Battle for Global Literacy (Viking Penguin, 2013) ISBN 978-1101606124

== Personal life ==
In 2010, Wood lived in San Francisco. In 2022, Wood said in an interview that he left Hong Kong after eight years due to the COVID policy and the national security law.
