= Nicaraguan Literacy Campaign =

1980 literacy campaign by the Sandinista government

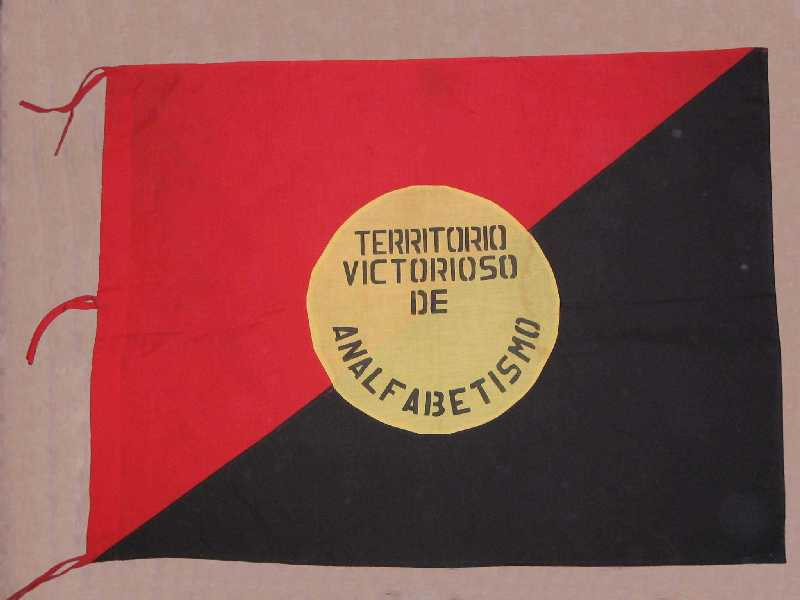
Flag declaring victory over illiteracy in places where it was eliminated

The Nicaraguan Literacy Campaign (Spanish: Cruzada Nacional de Alfabetización, CNA) was a campaign launched in 1980 by the Sandinista government in order to reduce illiteracy in Nicaragua. It was awarded the prestigious UNESCO Literacy Award. There have been many other literacy campaigns in the country since the first one was launched in 1980.

== The Nicaraguan Literacy Campaign of 1980 ==
=== History, planning and goals ===
In 1969, intentions to eliminate Nicaraguan illiteracy were outlined in the Sandinista National Liberation Front's (FSLN) historical program. Prior to the Sandinista Revolution in 1979 some 75% of the rural population of Nicaragua was illiterate. The total population had an estimated illiteracy rate of 50%. This was exacerbated by dictator Anastasio Somoza García not being in favor of an educated populace: "I don't want educated people, I want oxen." Planning for the literacy campaign began approximately four months after the Sandinista Revolution which overthrew the Somoza political dynasty. Nearly 60,000 youths (high school and college age) and 30,000 adults of varying backgrounds were trained in two weeks for the five-month campaign. Citizen groups, workers' associations, youth organizations, and public institutions provided organizational support for the campaign. The goals of the literacy campaign were of a social-political, strategic and educational nature:

- (a) to eradicate illiteracy;
- (b) to encourage an integration and understanding between Nicaraguans of different classes and backgrounds;
- (c) to increase political awareness;
- (d) to nurture attitudes and skills related to creativity, production, co-operation, discipline and analytical thinking;
- (e) to support national cohesion and consensus;
- (f) and to strengthen the channels for economic and political participation

=== The Literacy Campaign ===
The first Nicaraguan Literacy Campaign was launched by the Sandinista government and took place between March 3 and August 23, 1980. "The Year of Literacy" was a name issued by the government to refer to the year 1980. It was just one of the key large scale programs that the Sandinista government implemented during their presidency.

Volunteers came from all over the country to participate in the project. There were two types of volunteers in the project, those who could not leave for the countryside such as: housewives, government employees and workers; thus, they worked in urban neighborhoods as Citizens' Literacy Promoters (AP). The second and most important groups of volunteers under the Popular Literacy Army (EPA) were the youth that worked full-time in the rural and mountainous areas. The groups of influential youth who mostly came from secondary schools or universities, were named after the brigadistas that contributed to the Cuban Literacy Campaign. Like their Cuban mentors, the brigadistas did not only teach the rural people to read and write; but they were also integrated into the families, bridging the gap between the rural and urban citizens of the nation. Because the young volunteers were as young as 12 years of age, many parents speculated on the idea of allowing them to participate.

Massive campaigns through the media and youth groups were organized in order to convince them. Other campaigns had to also be arranged to convince teachers to participate, because a lot of them despised the idea of working closely with their students. Altogether, approximately 95,140.87 Nicaraguans actually volunteered in the campaign.

The campaign used a number of tactics to increase the participation and creativity of the illiterates during their learning process which included experiential learning, dialogue, group discussions and collective problem solving. However, these tactics were not as successful as perceived because the training process of the volunteers was very brief and started a month before the actual campaign. The first stage of the training process consisted of a two-week intensive workshop and those trained first would train the next group of volunteers. After the 3rd group was trained, schools and universities were closed down in order to train the remaining.

Literacy Congresses were held in order to evaluate the outcome of the literacy campaign. The evaluation illustrated impressive results considering the fact that a rocky road was taken to get to where they were. Altogether, about one-fifth of the population participated directly in the campaign and almost everyone was affected in at least an indirect way. Overall, illiteracy had reduced by about 37% with about 7% of people illiterate in the industrialized Pacific and 26% in the less developed regions. Even though illiteracy was still higher in the rural areas, they were more affected by the campaign with a major decrease of about 50%. The interaction between the rural and urban regions in Nicaragua was one of the most important results. Such interactions led to the integration of the once quite independent two regions, with a binding sense of nationalism throughout the country. The fact that every class, race, gender and age was involved, brought about a new perspective towards the distribution of power and wealth. Women also played a major role in the literacy campaign. Like the Cuban example, about 60% of the brigadistas were female and such a title made the women feel a sense of belonging and equalization in the revolutionary process of their country. Lastly, due to the great success of the campaign, Nicaragua made a substantial contribution in finding solutions for the eradication of illiteracy worldwide. In September 1980, UNESCO awarded Nicaragua with the Nadezhda K. Krupskaya award for the success of its literacy campaign. This was followed by the literacy campaigns of 1982, 1986, 1987, 1995 and 2000, all of which were also awarded by UNESCO.

== Criticism ==
A 1994 paper published in Development in Practice called into question the reported success of the literacy crusade. The authors did a follow-up of several women graduates of the crusade. It found that a decade later, a significant portion of them were no longer able to read or write; and that of those who could, the majority of them had previously attended formal schooling as children for several years. It notes however through anecdotal reports that the literary campaign might have had other positive impacts related to numeracy and maternal education. Much of the educational materials used in the campaign were political, making the campaign subject to criticism as being a means for the Sandinista government to indoctrinate the population.

== Other literacy campaigns ==
From October to March 1981 additional campaigns were held in Nicaragua's Caribbean coast to reduce illiteracy to over 12,000 people in their native languages of in local Miskito, Sumo and various Creole languages such as Nicaraguan Creole. This was followed by many other literacy campaigns throughout the nation.

=== Literacy campaigns of 2005–2009 ===
The first phase of the literacy campaign was carried out with support of Sandinista mayors' offices and used audiovisual equipment and teaching materials donated by Cuba as well as consulting assistance. During that period, around 70,000 people learned to read and write.

In 2007, after Daniel Ortega began his second term as President of Nicaragua, under the Carlos Fonseca Amador Popular Education Association, a new literacy campaign was announced and later launched in March 2007. The new literacy campaign was based on the "Yo, sí puedo" (Yes, I can) Cuban method. Estimates say over 350,000-500,000 Nicaraguans would be taught to read and write. The literacy campaign was coordinated by Orlando Pineda and received finance and support from Cuba, Spain and Venezuela. The goal of the literacy campaigns is to declare Nicaragua free of illiteracy by 2009.
