= International Literacy Day =

International observance, 8 September

- Observed by: All UN Member States
- Date: 8 September
- Next time: 8 September 2027
- Frequency: Annual

International Literacy Day is an international observance celebrated each year on 8 September. It was declared by UNESCO on 26 October 1966 at the 14th session of UNESCO's General Conference and celebrated for the first time in 1967. The day's aim is to highlight the importance of literacy to individuals, communities, and societies. Celebrations take place in several countries.

== Rationale ==
Some 775 million lack minimum literacy skills; one in five adults are still not literate, and two-thirds of them are women. 60.7 million children are out of school and many more attend irregularly or drop out. According to UNESCO’s "Global Monitoring Report on Education for All (2006)," South Asia has the lowest regional adult literacy rate (58.6%), followed by sub-Saharan Africa (59.7%). Countries with the lowest literacy rates in the world are Burkina Faso (12.8%), Niger (14.4%) and Mali (19%). The report shows a clear connection between illiteracy and countries in extreme poverty, also between illiteracy and prejudice against women.

== Celebrations ==
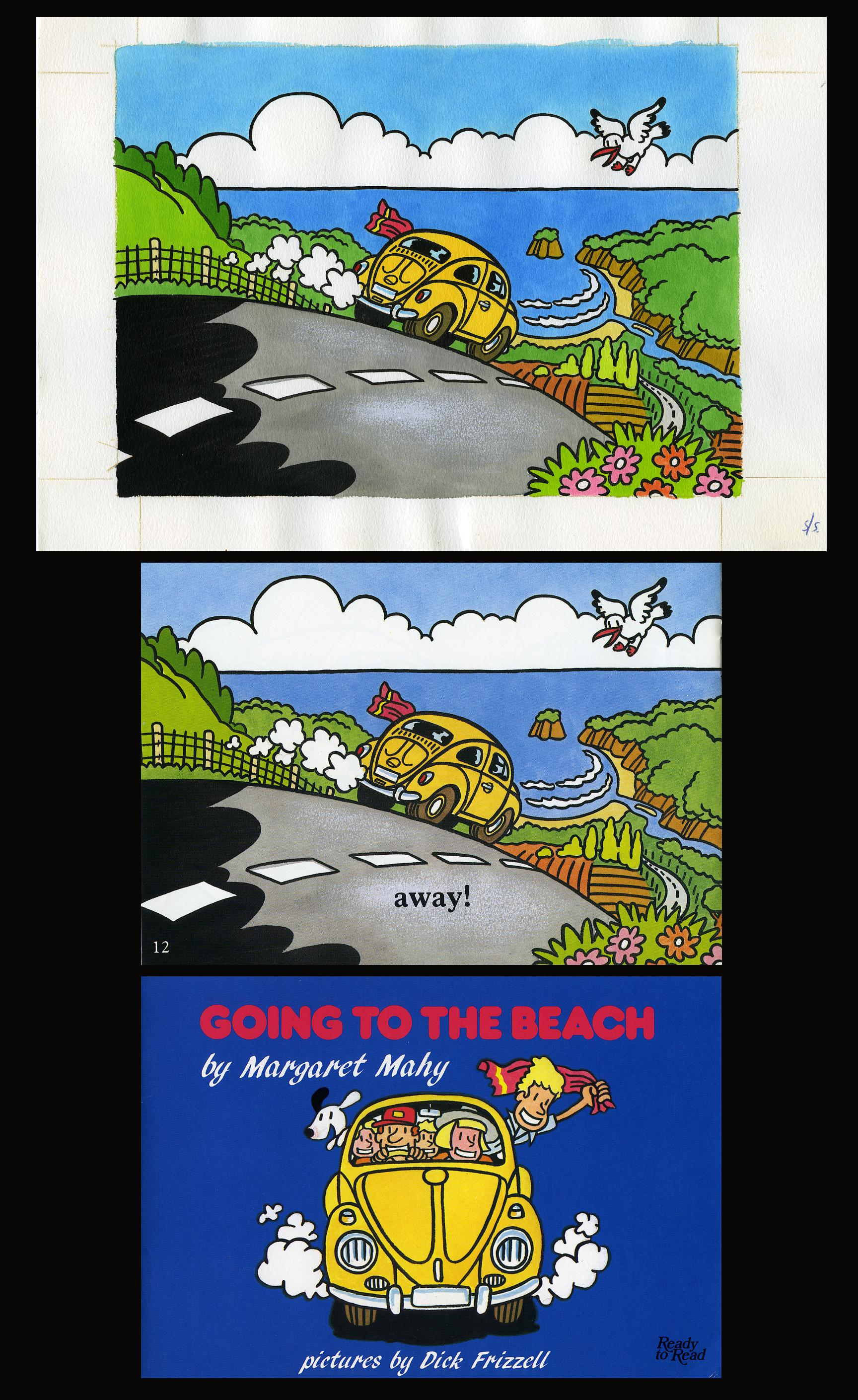
Image shared on the Archives New Zealand Flickr account to celebrate International Literacy Day

Celebrations of International Literacy Day have included specific themes, in line with Education For All goals and other United Nations programs such as the United Nations Literacy Decade.

The themes for celebrations and activities over the years are as follows:

2007 and 2008

The theme was “Literacy and Health”, with prizes awarded to organizations at the forefront of health education. This was also the thematic emphasis of the 2007–2008 United Nations Literacy Decade biennium. In particular, International Literacy Day 2008 strongly emphasizes "Literacy and Epidemics" with a focus on communicable diseases such as HIV, tuberculosis, and malaria - some of the world's forefront public health concerns.

2009–2010

For this celebration, the emphasis was placed on “Literacy and Empowerment,” with special consideration to gender equality and the Empowerment of women.

2011–2012

The theme of the 2011–2012 celebrations was “Literacy and Peace”.

2022

The theme was Transforming Literacy Learning Spaces to reconsider the basic significance of literacy learning spaces for fostering resilience and guaranteeing high-quality, equitable, and inclusive education for all.

2023

The theme for the 2023 celebration was Promoting Literacy for a World in transition: Building the foundation for Sustainable and Peaceful Societies.

2024

Promoting multilingual education: Literacy for mutual understanding and peace was the theme for the celebration.

The following writers are supporting UNESCO through the Writers for Literacy Initiative: Margaret Atwood, Paul Auster, Philippe Claudel, Paulo Coelho, Philippe Delerm, Fatou Diome, Chahdortt Djavann, Nadine Gordimer, Amitav Ghosh, Marc Levy, Alberto Manguel, Anna Moi, Scott Momaday, Toni Morrison, Érik Orsenna, Gisèle Pineau, El Tayeb Salih, Francisco Jose Sionil, Wole Soyinka, Amy Tan, Miklós Vámos, Abdourahman Waberi, Wei Wei, Banana Yoshimoto.

Along with the writers’ engagement, there are various companies and charity organizations that support the fight against illiteracy. Some supporters of International Literacy Day include the Global Development Research Center, Montblanc, the National Institute for Literacy, and Rotary International.

"At a time when we need to reinvent a world of hope, literacy is more important than ever. On this International Day, I thus invite all those involved in education to redouble their investments and mobilize all their resources to unleash the potential of each individual in the service of a shared world." — Audrey Azoulay, UNESCO Director General, on the occasion of International Literacy Day

2026 The theme for 2026 celebration is Literacy for people, the planet and prosperity

== See also ==
- Literacy
- List of countries by literacy rate
- UNESCO Confucius Prize for Literacy
- UNESCO King Sejong Literacy Prize
- United Nations Literacy Decade
- World Literacy Foundation
