= Teacher award =

Teacher awards are given to teachers in recognition of their services to their profession and the students they teach. There are numerous countries and organisations that give out awards.

== United States ==
The National Teacher of the Year program began in the United States in 1952 as a project by the Council of Chief State School Officers (CCSSO). The winning teacher is chosen by a selection committee from all the state schools around the country. They are then introduced to the American public in a ceremony, before being given a year away from classroom work in order to travel the country as a spokesperson for the profession.

The DisneyHand Teacher Awards are given out annually to a wide range of teachers, who receive US$10,000 and participate in the awards gala.

The National Teachers Hall of Fame is an award given out each year to five teachers. The first induction was held in June 1992. Located on the Emporia State University campus, the Hall of Fame includes a gallery of honored teachers, a Wall of Fame, and a miniatures display of classrooms through the centuries.

== United Kingdom ==
The Teaching Awards Trust give awards to teachers in the United Kingdom in a variety of categories.

== Germany ==
The Deutscher Lehrerpreis has been given to teachers and educational projects in Germany since 2009. It was created and is organized by the Vodafone foundation and the German philological association and is supported by German education researchers like Prof. Dr. Jürgen Baumert who is the vice-president of the Max Planck Institute for Human Development in Berlin and who conducted the Programme for International Student Assessment (PISA) study and German politicians like chancellor Angela Merkel. Students can nominate their teachers and a jury of professors, educators, politicians and student leaders selects Germany's teachers of the year.

== See also ==
- List of education awards
- List of academic awards
