= Penny Crane Award for Distinguished Service =

Annual award in education and computing

The Penny Crane Award for Distinguished Service is an award issued by the Association for Computing Machinery's Special Interest Group on University and College Computing Services. It was established in 2000 to recognise individuals who have made significant contributions to the Special Interest Group, and to computing in higher education.

== Recipients ==
Source: ACM

- 2000 – Jane Caviness
- 2001 – John H. (Jack) Esbin
- 2002 – John Bucher
- 2003 – Russell Vaught
- 2004 – Linda Hutchison
- 2005 – J. Michael Yohe
- 2006 – Jennifer Fajman
- 2007 – Dennis Mar
- 2008 – Jerry Smith
- 2009 – Robert Paterson
- 2010 – Lida Larsen
- 2011 – Leila Lyons
- 2012 – no recipient
- 2013 – Terris Wolff
- 2014 – Cynthia Dooling
- 2015 – Bob Haring-Smith
- 2016 – Phil Isensee
- 2017 – Tim Foley
- 2018 – Nancy Bauer
- 2019 – Kelly Wainwright
- 2022 – Melissa Bauer
- 2023 – Beth Rugg

== See also ==
- See Qualifications and Nominations page, at the ACM SIGUCCS Web Page.
- Penny Crane Award Web Page at ACM/SIGUCCS
- Penny Crane memory book
- List of computer science awards
