= AoC Beacon Awards =

The AoC Beacon Awards Programme was launched in 1994 to recognises and promote the interdependence of further education colleges. The award is supported by the AoC short for the Association of Colleges which represents all FE colleges in England and Wales. There are altogether over 60 sponsors for the award.

Since 1994 there have been 2,850 applicants for the Beacon Awards and there have been just over 250 awards.

== The Programme's Aims ==
- Recognise imaginative and innovatory teaching and learning practice in colleges.
- Draw attention to provision which encourages students to confront problems and issues creatively.
- Highlight the breadth and quality of education in colleges throughout the UK.
- Support learning and continuous improvement through the dissemination of Award-bearing practice.
- Raise awareness and increase understanding of colleges' contribution to and role within the UK economy.

The Programme represents partnership in action by providing significant benefits for the major players involved:

An Award acts as a development grant to help realise the full potential of a project based in a college of further education. An Award serves to promote the business needs and interests of the sponsor.
