= Australian Student Prize =

- Description: National recognition for academic excellence in secondary education
- Country: Australia
- Presented by: Australian Government

The Australian Student Prize (formerly the Lord Florey Student Prize) was an Australian Government prize that was awarded annually from 1991 to 2014, to give "national recognition to academic excellence and achievement in secondary education". Five hundred students received the award each year, which consisted of a certificate and cash prize. The cash prize was A$2000 until 2014, when the prize was reduced to $1000. The prize is no longer awarded as of 2015.

Each State and Territory Minister for Education nominated a number of students (according to the state or territory's proportion of year 12 students) for the prize each year. Medallists from Australia's teams in the International Biology, Chemistry, Informatics, Mathematics and Physics Olympiads also received the Australian Student Prize.

Prize winners were announced in the year following their completion of high school, generally in June. Names were printed in various newspapers across Australia, and were posted on the prize's website, where a list of past winners is still available.

== Website ==
- Australian Student Prize
