= MEDEA Awards =

Free competition for images and sound in education

- Awarded for: Innovation and good practice in the use of media in education
- Location: Brussels, Belgium
- Hosted by: Media & Learning Conference
- First award: 2007
- Website: www.medea-awards.com

The MEDEA Awards is a free competition launched in November 2007 and organised by the Media & Learning Association. It aims to encourage innovation in the use of moving images and sound in education, across Europe and beyond.
The MEDEA Awards are integrated in the Media & Learning Conference, a yearly conference about the use of media in education which takes place in Brussels, Belgium.

== Past Awards Winners ==
Edition	Entries	Participant Countries	Jury Members
MEDEA Awards 2008	121	25	35
MEDEA Awards 2009	254	38	77
MEDEA Awards 2010	136	31	74
MEDEA Awards 2011	115	28	75
MEDEA Awards 2012	213	32	90
MEDEA Awards 2013	342	37	118
MEDEA Awards 2014	237	29	Not Mentioned

=== MEDEA Awards 2008 ===
Sources:

- Overall Award Winner: Rättegångsskolan på webben/Court introduction by the Brottsoffermyndigheten/Crime Victim Compensation and Support Authority (Sweden)
- Special Jury Award: Anti-Anti by Sint-Lievenscollege Gent (Belgium)

=== MEDEA Awards 2009 ===
Sources:

- Overall Award Winner: Know IT All for Primary Schools by Childnet International (UK)
- Special Jury Award: Eyes on the Skies by European Southern Observatory (Germany)
- European Collaboration Award: Traditions Across Europe by Istituto Comprensivo “Don Bosco” (Italy)
- Award for Creativity and Innovation: Daisy and Drago by Terakki Foundation Schools (Turkey)

=== MEDEA Awards 2010 ===
Sources:

- Overall Award Winner and Professional Production Award: BBC News School Report by BBC News (UK)
- Special Jury Award: Pocket Anatomy by eMedia Interactive (Ireland)
- European Collaboration Award: Evolution of Life by LMU Munich (Germany) and CNDP - Centre National de Documentation Pédagogique (France)
- User-Generated Content Award: Et si c'était toi? by the Lycée Technique du Centre (Luxembourg)
