= Deutscher Lehrerpreis =

German teacher award

Logo

The Deutscher Lehrerpreis is a teacher award in Germany. It is awarded in two major categories: the first category awards teachers who exhibit innovative teaching practices, and the second category allows students to nominate their teachers for responsible student-teacher collaboration. The award was created and is organized by the Vodafone Foundation and the German Philological Association.

It is supported by German education researchers, such as Professor Dr. Jürgen Baumert who is the vice-president of the Max Planck Institute for Human Development in Berlin and who conducted the Programme for International Student Assessment (PISA) study, and German politicians such as Chancellor Angela Merkel.

== Award categories ==
The award was created by the Vodafone Foundation, the German Philological Foundation, German politicians and education professors, intending to reward the work of teachers and improve public appreciation of teachers. At the 2011 award ceremony, German Chancellor Angela Merkel said: "We need teachers with a passion. They are the ones that are responsible for the quality of a school."

The Deutscher Lehrerpreis is awarded in two major categories. The first category is awarded for innovative teaching practices. Teachers from German secondary schools can apply with their projects, and a total of 13,000 Euros are awarded. The second category is awarded for responsible cooperation between students and teachers. Students who are about to graduate or have already graduated may nominate their teachers for the second category.

== Media coverage ==
The German teaching award always finds a wide media coverage in the German media each year. These articles describe the competition and discuss the importance of good teachers in Germany. The winning teachers and teaching projects are portrayed and the teachers interviewed. Media coverage regarding the Deutscher Lehrerpreis has appeared in the Süddeutsche Zeitung, die Zeit, Hannoversche Allgemeine Zeitung, Spiegel Online, Focus (German magazine) Online, the Westdeutscher Rundfunk, Abendzeitung München, the Berliner Morgenpost, Deutschlandfunk, radio stations such as the Bayerischer Rundfunk, the Deutschlandradio, and Südwestrundfunk2. Television reports regarding the Lehrerpreis and individual award recipients appear on large TV stations such as the ARD (broadcaster), Südwestrundfunk, and the Norddeutscher Rundfunk and Bayerischer Rundfunk.
