= Lake Forest Graduate School of Management =

Private business school in Illinois

- Type: Private business school
- Active: 1946–2026
- President: Carrie G. Buchwald
- Postgraduates: 196 (fall 2024)
- Location: Lake Forest, Illinois, United States
- Colors: Red, and White
- Website: www.lfgsm.edu

Lake Forest Graduate School of Management was a private business school from 1946 to 2026 in Lake Forest, Illinois, United States. The Illinois Board of Higher Education serves as the custodian of records for the school following the its closure.

It opened in 1946 as a response to the need for WWII veterans to translate their experience into practical business skills and foundational business knowledge. In 2004, the institution moved its campus to its present location near the Tri-State Tollway. Its programs included a Master in Business Administration, a graduate certificate, and open-enrollment, non-credit executive education courses. The campus of Lake Forest Graduate School of Management was also associated with the Lake Forest Center for Leadership which offers leadership development consultation and customized programming to be held within external organizations. The school's leaders closed the school at the end of the 2025-2026 academic year.

== History ==
Lake Forest Graduate School of Management was created to respond to a business need in the Lake Forest, Illinois area as a shortage of management talent left local industry in need of leadership. To address the issue, three companies, Abbott Laboratories, Fansteel Metallurgical Corporation, and Johns-Manville Products Corporation joined with Lake Forest College to form the Lake Forest College Industrial Management Institute (IMI) in 1946. IMI provided management training for returning veterans to help them transition into business.

Since then LFGSM amicably separated from Lake Forest College, changed its name to Lake Forest Graduate School of Management, and established itself as a provider of both degree and non-degree business management education in the Chicago metropolitan area. LFGSM operates as an independent, private, and not-for-profit organization. It is accredited by the Higher Learning Commission and authorized to grant master's degrees by the Illinois Board of Higher Education.

In December 2025, the school's president announced that it would discontinue its MBA academic operations and close as an accredited institution following the 2025–2026 academic year, citing declining enrollment. As part of the transition, the institution entered into an agreement with Excelsior University, a nonprofit university based in Albany, New York, to provide enrolled students the option to complete their degrees online. The Lake Forest Center for Leadership is expected to continue operating independently of the MBA program.

The Illinois Board of Higher Education serves as the custodian of records for the school following the its closure.
