= UNESCO Confucius Prize for Literacy =

The UNESCO Confucius Prize for Literacy recognizes the activities of outstanding individuals, governments or governmental agencies and non-governmental organizations (NGOs) working in literacy serving rural adults and out-of-school youth, particularly women and girls. The Prize was established in 2005 through the support of the Government of the People's Republic of China in honour of the great Chinese scholar Confucius. It is part of the International Literacy Prizes, which UNESCO awards every year in recognition of excellence and inspiring experiences in the field of literacy throughout the world. The Confucius Prize offers two awards of US$20,000 each, a medal and a diploma, as well as a study visit to literacy project sites in China.

The Prize is open to institutions, organizations or individuals displaying outstanding merit in literacy, achieving particularly effective results and promoting innovative approaches. The selection of prizewinners is made by an International Jury appointed by UNESCO's Director-General, which meets in Paris once a year. The Prize is awarded at an official ceremony held for that purpose at UNESCO Headquarters in Paris on the occasion of International Literacy Day (8 September).

== Recipients of the Prize by year ==
- 2019
  - "Camacol Antioquia" in Colombia for Obras Escuala programme
  - "BASAbali" in Indonesia for BASAbali Wiki programme
  - "Nuovo Comitato il Nobel per I Disabili" in Italy for TELL ME - Theatre for Education and Literacy Learning of Migrants in Europe programme
- 2018
  - The Literacy Movement Organization in the Islamic Republic of Iran for Consolidated teaching of literacy and ICDL basic computer skills programme
  - The Nigerian Prisons Service in Nigeria for iNational Open University of Nigeria - Prison Study Centres and Inmates General Education Programme
  - The Foundation Elche Acoge in Spain for Spanish as a second language for adult immigrants programme
- 2017
  - AdulTICoProgram (Colombia) for teaching digital competencies to seniors
  - The Citizens Foundation (Pakistan) for its Aagahi Literacy Programme for Women and Out-of-School Girls
  - FunDza (South Africa) for its readers and writers project to develop a culture of reading and writing for pleasure through an online platform
- 2016
  - The South African department of Basic Education's Kha Ri Gude Mass Literacy Campaign
  - The Jan Shikshan Sansthan organization in Kerala, India, for its programme, Vocational and Skill Development for Sustainable Development
  - The Directorate of Literacy and National Languages in Senegal for its ‘National Education Programme for Illiterate Youth and Adults through ICTs
- 2015
  - Sonia Álvarez, Juan Luis Vives School of Valparaiso, a school in Chile, is recognized for its programme Literacy for People Deprived of Liberty
  - Svatobor an Association, in Slovakia, is honoured for its ‘Romano Barardo' programme, which helps the Roma overcome social exclusion and enjoy their basic human rights.
  - Platform of Associations in Charge of ASAMA and Post-ASAMA, an NGO in Madagascar that developed a comprehensive approach to achieve the Millennium Development Goals (MDGs)
- 2012
  - Department of Continuing and Adults Education – Programme of Non-Formal and Continuing Education (Bhutan)
  - Transformemos Foundation Directors María Aurora Carrillo Rodolfo Ardila – Interactive System Transformemos Educando (Colombia)
  - (Honourable Mention) Illiteracy Eradication Directorate of the Ministry of Education – Literacy and Post-literacy programme: Means of empowerment and socio-economic integration of women in Morocco (Morocco)
- 2011:
  - Room to Read (United States)
  - Collectif Alpha Ujuvi (Democratic Republic of Congo)
  - (Honourable Mention) Dr. Allah Bakhsh Malik, Punjab (Pakistan)
- 2010:
  - Governorate of Ismailia (Egypt)
  - Coalition of Women Farmers (COWFA) (Malawi)
  - Non-Formal Education Centre (Nepal)
- 2009:
  - SERVE Afghanistan (Afghanistan)
  - Municipal Literacy Coordinating Council (Philippines)
- 2008:
  - Adult and Non-Formal Education Association (ANFEAE) (Ethiopia)
  - Operation Upgrade (South Africa)
- 2007:
  - Family Re-orientation Education and Empowerment (FREE) (Nigeria)
  - Reach Out and Read (United States of America)
- 2006:
  - Ministry of National Education of the Kingdom of Morocco, for its innovative national literacy initiative
  - Directorate of Literacy and Continuing Education of Rajasthan, for its Useful Learning through Literacy and Continuing Education Programme in Rajasthan (India)

== See also ==
- International Literacy Day
- List of international literacy prizes
- Noma Literacy Prize
- UNESCO King Sejong Literacy Prize
- UNESCO Nadezhda K. Krupskaya literacy prize
- United Nations Literacy Decade
