= Association of Colleges =

Organisation for sixth form and further education colleges in England

- Abbreviation: AoC
- Formation: 1996
- Purpose: Representative organisation for further education and sixth form colleges in England
- Location: 2-5 Stedham Place, London, WC1A 1HU
- Region served: England
- Chief Executive: David Hughes
- Website: www.aoc.co.uk

The Association of Colleges (AoC) is a not-for-profit membership organisation in England set up by colleges to act as their collective voice, representing further education colleges, with an associated registered charitable trust and a commercial arm, AoC Services. The Association was created in 1996 and provides a broad range of services to its member FE colleges.

Today, AoC represents and promotes the interests of 248 further education, sixth form, tertiary and specialist colleges across England – over 95% of the sector. It influences Government and its agencies on policies affecting colleges and their students and staff at national and regional levels. They also provide members with professional support services, which include expert advice lines for employment, communications, health and safety, governance and teaching and learning. Each year it hosts a large Annual Conference and Exhibition to consider the future of the sector.

AoC is governed by a Board composed of principals from member colleges, together with members appointed to represent the interests of various groupings within the sector or to enhance the effectiveness of the Board. In addition, there is a Governors’ Council which advises the Board on Governance related matters. Each November, AoC holds an Annual Conference and Exhibition which brings together senior leaders and policy makers to discuss the future of the sector. The 2016 event took place on 15–17 November in Birmingham.

== Subsidiaries ==
AoC Services provide additional support to colleges in areas which may not be covered in AoC's member services. These range from recruitment of permanent and interim staff, training, conferences and events, sponsorship and consultancy. All profits that AoC Create makes are reinvested into the FE sector through the AoC.

AoC Jobs is their specialist job board for further education, promoting jobs available in colleges. These range from teaching, lecturing and tutoring jobs to more general business support roles and senior management positions.

AoC Sport is the lead membership organisation for college sport and physical activity. AoC Sport encourages and supports every student to participate in sport and physical activity as an integrated part of their college experience.

AoC Charitable Trust aims to support post-16 education. The Trust administers two UK-wide annual awards schemes. Supported by education and industry sponsorship, the Beacon Awards recognise outstanding college provision in subjects ranging from widening participation to sport. The Gold Awards acknowledge college alumni who have made a major contribution to their field.

== Love Our Colleges ==
Love Our Colleges is an annual week-long event supported by the AoC, which describes it as "a chance to celebrate and shout about all the brilliant things that colleges do, day in and day out to build communities, boost businesses, and support individuals. It is also our opportunity to call on government for better investment in colleges, and fair pay for college staff." Individual colleges organise their own events, such as a skills roundtable held at Keighley College in 2023 and attended by the Skills Minister.
