= List of science communication awards =

This list of science communication awards is an index of articles about notable awards for science communication, including journalism and books. The list is organized by the country of the sponsoring organization, although awards may not be restricted to people in that country.

== List ==
Country	Award	Sponsor	Given for
Brazil	Prêmio José Reis de Divulgação Científica	National Council for Scientific and Technological Development	Contribution to the dissemination and public awareness of science and technology in Brazil
Canada	Innis-Gérin Medal	Royal Society of Canada	Distinguished and sustained contribution to the literature of the social sciences
Canada	Lane Anderson Award	Fitzhenry Family Foundation	Canadian non-fiction science in two categories; adult and young readers
Canada	Prix Hubert-Reeves	Association of Science Communicators of Quebec	Popular science book written in French and published in Canada
Canada	Yves Fortier Earth Science Journalism Award	Geological Association of Canada	Journalist exceptionally effective in presenting earth science stories in one of Canada's newspapers or periodicals
Denmark	H. C. Ørsted Medal (silver)	Selskabet for naturlærens udbredelse	Outstanding writing of science for a popular audience over several years
Europe	Science Communication Prize	European Commission	Eligible forms of science communication include public engagement, written communication including newspaper articles and popular science books, audio-visual media including TV programmes and websites, and "innovative action"
Europe	«Estudi General» European Award For The Popularisation Of Science 2024	University of Valencia and the Alzira City Council	Open to essays devoted to popularise scientific and technological knowledge written in Catalan, Spanish, English and French.
Germany	Multiple awards, see Science section of Journalistenpreise (German only)	Multiple sponsoring bodies and organizations	Multiple reasons
International	Kalinga Prize	UNESCO	Exceptional skill in presenting scientific ideas to lay people
International	Ludwik Fleck Prize	Society for Social Studies of Science	Book in the field of science and technology studies
International	Stephen Hawking Medal for Science Communication	Starmus Festival	Recognize the work of those helping to promote the public awareness of science
India	ASI Zubin Kembhavi Award	Astronomical Society of India	Biennial award for individuals or groups who have made significant and outstanding contributions in the area of Public Outreach and Education in Astronomy and allied fields
Ireland	Mary Mulvihill Award	Mary Mulvihill Association	Annual competition to find the entry that best represents the curiosity, creativity and story-telling imagination that Mary Mulvihill showed in her work.
New Zealand	SCANZ Award	Science Communicator's Association of New Zealand	Biennial awards to recognise outstanding communication of science to a non-scientific audience.
Norway	Research Council of Norway's Award for Excellence in Communication of Science	Research Council of Norway	Dissemination of research to a broad audience. The dissemination must be of high quality in both form and content
Poland	Jan Długosz Award	Kraków Book Fair	Works in the field of humanities written by Polish authors which make significant contributions to the advancement of science and cultural enrichment
Spain	Fonseca Prize	University of Santiago de Compostela	Popularization of science
United Kingdom	Best science book ever	Royal Institution	Best book
United Kingdom	Kelvin Medal and Prize	Institute of Physics	Outstanding contributions to the public understanding of physics
United Kingdom	Kohn Award	Royal Society	Beginning scientists who had achieved significant cultural impact through broadcasting or public speech
United Kingdom	Royal Society Prizes for Science Books	Royal Society	Outstanding popular science books from around the world
United Kingdom	Royal Society of London Michael Faraday Prize	Royal Society	Excellence in communicating science to UK audiences
United States	Andrew Gemant Award	American Institute of Physics	Substantial cultural, artistic, or humanistic contributions to physics
United States	Borlaug CAST Communication Award	Council for Agricultural Science and Technology	Outstanding achievement by a scientist, engineer, technologist, or other professional working in the agricultural, environmental, or food sectors for contributing to the advancement of science in the public policy arena
United States	Carl Sagan Award for Public Appreciation of Science	Council of Scientific Society Presidents	Individuals who have become “concurrently accomplished as researchers and/or educators, and as widely recognized magnifiers of the public's understanding of science
United States	Chambliss Astronomical Writing Award	American Astronomical Society	Astronomy writing for an academic audience, specifically textbooks at either the upper-division undergraduate level or the graduate level
United States	IEEE-USA Award for Distinguished Contributions Furthering Public Understanding of the Profession	Institute of Electrical and Electronics Engineers	Outstanding journalistic or other efforts that lead to a better public understanding of the contributions of engineering professionals to the enhancement and expansion of the social, economic, and cultural aspects of life
United States	James T. Grady-James H. Stack Award for Interpreting Chemistry	American Chemical Society	Outstanding reporting on chemistry, chemical engineering, and related chemical fields
United States	John Burroughs Medal	John Burroughs Association	Book judged to be distinguished in the field of natural history
United States	Kistler Prize	Foundation For the Future	Original contributions to the understanding of the connection between human heredity and human society
United States	National Academies Communication Award	National Academy of Sciences etc.	Creative works that help the public understand topics in science, engineering or medicine
United States	National Academies Eric and Wendy Schmidt Awards for Excellence in Science Communications	National Academies of Sciences, Engineering, and Medicine.	For individuals who are working on the frontlines of science communication and journalism, and who can demonstrate the potential or ability to develop high-quality, engaging communications or reporting.
United States	Patrusky Lecture	Council for the Advancement of Science Writing	
United States	PEN/E. O. Wilson Literary Science Writing Award	PEN America	Writing that exemplifies literary excellence on the subject of physical and biological sciences
United States	Science Writing Award	American Institute of Physics	Effective science communication in print and broadcast media in order to improve the general public's appreciation of physics, astronomy, and allied science fields
United States	Science in Society Journalism Awards	National Association of Science Writers	Outstanding investigative and interpretive reporting about the sciences and their impact for good and ill
Thailand	The Mahidol Science Communicator Award	Faculty of Science, Mahidol University	The persons who have outstanding achievements in science communication which are visible among the public and have received national recognition

== See also ==
- Lists of awards
- List of journalism awards
- List of writing awards#Science writing awards
- List of education awards
