= New South Wales Institute for Educational Research =

Australian educational research institute

The New South Wales Institute for Educational Research (also known as the NSW Institute for Educational Research) is a long-standing not-for-profit educational research institute, based in New South Wales, Australia.

== History ==
The NSW Institute for Educational Research Incorporated was founded in Sydney in 1928, and as such is one of the oldest established research institutes in Australia. In 1998 the institute was registered as a NSW incorporated association. Since foundation, the institute has continued to make a significant contribution to discourse on educational policy in New South Wales and Australia.

== Objectives ==
The Constitution stipulates that the objectives of the Institute are to encourage "study, research and service" in education and to do this lists discussion, criticism, identification of research issues, and dissemination of results. The Institute may conduct research as an Institute activity.

== Activities ==
The central activity for the NSW Institute for Educational Research is an Annual Conference, at which members present scholarly papers in research in education. The NSW Institute also hosts an annual Sir Harold Wyndham Memorial Lecture, to honour an important NSW educationist. The institute offers student grants for educational research. The New South Wales Institute for Educational Research Award for Outstanding Educational Research was inaugurated in 1972 and is conferred for an outstanding doctoral thesis (or outstanding doctoral theses) completed within the field of educational research.

== Publications ==
The Institute publishes a Newsletter and an academic journal Issues in Educational Research, jointly published with the Institutes for Educational Research in Western Australia, South Australia, and the Northern Territory. Addresses to the Institute are at times also published in monograph form and at times the Institute publishes its own research in monograph form.

== Governance ==
The governance of the institute is through a constitution which is administered by a voluntary elected Executive Committee. The executive committee reports to an Annual General Meeting.

== Membership ==
Membership is open to any persons committed to the objectives of the institute. However, in considering applications for membership, the Institute may consider whether the applicant holds an appropriate tertiary qualification or the equivalent, the educational experience of the applicant, and the research experience of the applicant.

== Affiliation ==
As a state institute for educational research, the NSW Institute for Educational Research is affiliated with the Australian Council for Educational Research, and elects a representative to the national body.

== Awards ==
The New South Wales Institute for Educational Research Award for Outstanding Educational Research is awarded annually by the institute to recognise outstanding individuals who have produced outstanding doctoral theses in educational research.
