= Best Student of Mongolia award =

The Ministry of Education Culture and Science of Mongolia, Ministry of Finance of Mongolia, New World Foundation of Mongolia and Young Leader Club together with the Mongolian National Television annually select the Best Student of the certain year. To be nominated, the student has to be pursuing undergraduate studies in Mongolia. The award ceremony has been organized for the last decade. It is the most prestigious award that can be given to a student pursuing an undergraduate degree in Mongolia. Its recipients are awarded a full scholarship to study in a prestigious university anywhere in the world. The Ministry of Education covers the full financial support. The award ceremony has always been broadcast on Mongolian National Television (Mongolian National Broadcaster- MNB).
