= World Literacy Foundation =

International not-for-profit organization

- Abbreviation: WLF
- Founded: 2003
- Founder: Andrew Kay, CEO
- Type: Not-for-profit organisation Educational organisation
- Purpose: Literacy, education, children's rights
- Location(s): Australia, Melbourne; Colombia, Manizales; United Kingdom, Oxford; United States, Grandville
- Method: Literacy-based projects
- Key people: Dr Anthony Cree OAM, Chairman
- Website: worldliteracyfoundation.org

The World Literacy Foundation (WLF) is a global not-for-profit that works to lift young people out of poverty through literacy. Founded in Melbourne, Australia in 2003, the World Literacy Foundation operates on the principle that education is a basic human right. It aims to eradicate global illiteracy through the promotion of literacy and the provision of educational resources.

The World Literacy foundation works to get communities involved and raise awareness of the importance of literacy. It is reported that 1 out of every 10, or 750 million people globally are illiterate.

== Background ==
Since its establishment in 2003, the World Literacy Foundation has grown to align with the needs of an evolving education sector. The World Literacy Foundation has worked towards forging partnerships with other leading educational and related not-for-profit organisations, and has built long-lasting relationships within communities around the world.

The World Literacy Foundation significantly dedicates its time and resources to conducting research, and uses resulting information to help advocate in local communities as well as on a global scale. It mobilise communities through passionate volunteers, and seeks to give individuals a voice so that they can also act as advocates for literacy within their own communities. The World Literacy Foundation believes that raising community awareness is vital to the improvement of literacy standards.

The World Literacy Foundation annually monitors a range of indicators in the education area and prepares a report on economic and social cost of illiteracy. In 2012, the WLF compiled a report which focuses on the economic and social cost of illiteracy in the United Kingdom. The research was devoted to economic and social cost of illiteracy in the country. It stated that one in five of the UK population is functionally illiterate and this rate costs the national economy 81 billion pounds a year in lost earnings and high welfare spending.

The World Literacy Foundation convened the World Literacy Summit at Oxford University (UK) in April 2012 to stimulate co-operation in the global literacy sector in order to support 796 million illiterate people in developed and developing worlds. The list of invited delegates included about 300 leaders in the fields of government, development, literacy and academic sectors. The Oxford Declaration became the resulting document of this event; it was designed to combine efforts of government, business, non-governmental organizations and educational institutions to promote literacy worldwide.

== International community projects ==
The World Literacy Foundation's projects are aimed at raising global literacy rates and teaching educational standards. The World Literacy Foundation volunteers and partner communities have worked in Azerbaijan, Indonesia, India, Pakistan, Colombia, Mozambique, Uganda, and other developing countries to provide access to quality education and learning resources to disadvantaged communities. With bases on five of the seven continents, the World Literacy Foundation tailors each operation to the country's specific literacy needs. In the African sect based in Uganda, where many people live in poverty and have no electricity the World Literacy Foundation has donated solar powered tablets. Paired with the Sun Books initiative the World Literacy Foundation is not just donating recourses but also training to teachers at the primary school level.

Where the foundation was started in Australia, the goal is geared towards closing the gap of literacy between Indigenous and non-Indigenous children. For indigenous people illiteracy rates are a more prominent problem. To improve skills such as reading and number skills, the World Literacy Foundation has developed a program called the Indigenous Learning App. This app contains multilingual e-books and multiple literacy games in not just English but also the local dialect in Australia.

In the African sect with headquarters in Uganda, where many people live in poverty and have no electricity the World Literacy Foundation has donated solar powered tablets. Paired with the Sun Books initiative the World Literacy Foundation is not just donating recourses but also training to teachers at the primary school level on how to use these resources effectively. The solar powered tablets come preloaded with digital learning content and multilingual e-books. In Uganda only roughly 27% of people have access to electricity and the cost of one book can be a whole month's salary. These Sun Books are useful in the sense that they do not need to be electrically charged and are universal tools, coming loaded with multiple uses.

Several years ago, the World Literacy Foundation founded their South America sect in Manizales, Colombia. Latin America is in dire need of educational reform, over 35 million people over the age of 15 are illiterate. Here it is only expected that children attend school for 6 years compared to the traditional 12 most other countries require. To help improve these statistics the World Literacy Foundation runs two classes a week for over 60 children and other community members. During beneficial classes the World Literacy Foundation supports learners of all ages with tutoring and reading services.

In the United Kingdom illiteracy costs the UK's economy roughly US$50 billion a year. It is here the World Literacy Foundation has run 26 fundraising projects, book distribution drives and provides numerous services. To help combat illiteracy the World literacy Foundation provides services such as parent mentoring, tutoring services, delivering literacy recourses, and distributes multilingual children/baby books. In the UK the World Literacy Foundation also has made a pack to new mothers to whom English would not be their first language to improve literacy and help them improve their standard of life.

Even in the United States there is a literacy crisis. This gap can be measured by 30 million words, and this stretches from learners who live in poverty to those who are afforded the best education money can buy. Although it is not just the socioeconomics that divide America's literate, literacy rates also greatly range between racial groups. To support American learners the World Literacy Foundation has encouraged 150 schools to participate in International literacy Day. In February 2019 a project called Michigan Reads debuted; this is an initiative to provide tutoring and literacy resources to children from all backgrounds in Michigan. In America there are also over 60 Youth Ambassadors who promote literacy in their schools and communities.

=== Global projects ===
The World Literacy Foundation hosts several global projects a year. The most popular being the International Day of Literacy. The United Nations Educational, Scientific, and Cultural Organization (UNESCO) has declared International Literacy Day September 8 and is annually celebrated by 4,000 schools. Each school participates by hosting events and fundraising to spread literacy awareness, and the belief that literacy is a basic human right. By encouraging schools to participate the World Literacy Foundation aims to spread awareness and understanding about the importance of literacy. By providing literacy skills through the promotion of International Literacy Day, the World Literacy Foundation hopes to also inspire learners to shoot for the stars and be the best them they can be.

The Youth Ambassador project is run globally starting from the beginning of the application process in February the project runs through November when applicants are certified. The World Literacy Foundation enlists people aged 12–24 to raise awareness for literacy in their communities. Recently as 2018 the foundation has enlisted ambassadors from 35 separate countries ranking more than 300 strong. Youth Ambassadors work collectively as a group of motivated individuals who aim to eradicate illiteracy.

Every two years the World Literacy Foundation hosts an event called the World Literacy Summit. Held in Oxford, UK this is a three-day long event in which numerous minds gather to discuss all matters surrounding global illiteracy. This event brings together literacy and educational leaders, specialists from governments, and inter-government bodies, for profit sectors, academic scholars and researchers. The goal is to build a global community of continuous collaboration on ideas and awareness for literacy. The fourth World Literacy Summit was scheduled for 5 April 2020.

== Efforts to end world illiteracy ==
In 1965, UNESCO declared September 8 International Literacy Day. On the same date in 2016 the World Literacy Foundation launched "The Sky's The Limit" campaign. The purpose of this campaign is to hopefully eliminate the digital divide that separate communities in which electricity is not available.

Another project in Australia is "Reading Out of Poverty", where the World Literacy Foundation distribute children's books, literacy resources and tutoring to enhance literacy skills and reading levels of children from low income backgrounds.

== Effects of illiteracy ==
According to studies by the World Literacy Foundation "illiterate parents tend to have lower expectations and aspirations regarding education for themselves and their children". Poor families often place work before education and the children of the parents who have failed to complete primary education tend to do the same. The cost of illiteracy to the global economy is estimated at US$1.19 trillion. Illiteracy does not only impact us as a society economically. It also impacts the group of people who cannot advocate for themselves because they do not possess literacy skills to do so. In countries like Latin America where work is valued over school many children only receive half the education they are entitled to. Other reports published by the World Literacy Foundation also found those who cannot read earn lower salaries and illiterate parents' children are more likely to grow up unable to read and be trapped in a cycle.

== Mission, vision, and goals ==
The mission of the World Literacy foundation is to ensure every individual has the opportunity to acquire literacy and reading skills. Regardless of geographic location, financial situation or social status, the World Literacy Foundation believes access to education is a basic human right. Free and appropriate access to education allows young individuals to eventually reach their full potential whether that be in the school or work setting.

"Goals:To raise global literacy standards, to provide free access to quality education materials, to innovate solutions that target wide-scale illiteracy and to encourage lifelong learning." The Purpose of the World Literacy foundation is to create a greater understanding and awareness of literacy in the community. The plan is to do this through the use of social media, conferences, training, research and collaborative partnerships internationally.
