= The Science, Engineering & Technology Student of the Year Awards =

British and Irish award

Science, Engineering & Technology Student of the Year Awards (SET Awards)
- Description: Recognition for outstanding undergraduate students in STEM fields
- Location: London (Award ceremony)
- Country: United Kingdom and Republic of Ireland
- Website: www.setawards.org

The Science, Engineering & Technology Student of the Year Awards (SET Awards) were presented to outstanding undergraduate students in the United Kingdom yearly between 1998 and 2013. The award was open to students who were on a first-degree course at a university located within the United Kingdom of Great Britain and Northern Ireland, as well as students from the Republic of Ireland. The awards were presented at a dinner in London among technology students, academics, industry executives, government leaders, and the media.

== Categories ==
Awards reflected the range of Science, Engineering & Technology degrees offered by UK and Irish universities. Each award was sponsored by a company, professional body, or other organisation with a particular interest in the field of the award.

- Best Aeronautical Engineering Student
- Best Biology & Biotechnology Student
- Best Chemical Engineering Student
- Best Chemistry Student
- Best Civil Engineering Student
- Best Computational Science Student
- Best Food, Nutrition & Health Student
- Best Electronic Engineering Student
- Best Information Technology Student
- Best Maritime Technology Student
- Best Materials Student
- Best Mathematics Student
- Best Mechanical Engineering Student
- Best Pharmacology Student
- Best Physics Student

The highest scoring student overall was declared the "Science, Engineering and Technology Student of the Year".
