= SIGUCCS =

ACM's special interest group on University and College Computing Services

ACM SIGUCCS
- Chair: Lisa Brown
- Website: http://www.siguccs.org/

SIGUCCS (Special Interest Group on University and College Computing Services) is an association of professionals who support and manage the diverse aspects of information technology services at higher education institutions by providing professional development opportunities for SIGUCCS members and other individuals in the field. SIGUCCS is one of 34 special interest groups of ACM, the Association for Computing Machinery, the world’s largest educational and scientific computing society.

Founded in 1963, ACM SIGUCCS focuses on issues surrounding the support, delivery and management of information technology services in higher education. Areas of special interest include but are not limited to: end user services (help desk, student labs, training, documentation, consulting), curricular support, audio-visual services, educational technology issues, information technology management, academic technology, and faculty support.

== Conference ==
ACM SIGUCCS hosts a single conference annually, typically in March or April. Conference proceedings are available online through the ACM Digital Library to SIGUCCS members or library subscribers. Information about past conferences and SIGUCCS-sponsored travel grants is available on the ACM SIGUCCS Website.

The SIG hosts webinars throughout the year. Ongoing communication to allow networking in between conferences is available through an email discussion list and social media.

== Awards ==
The ACM SIGUCCS Penny Crane Award for Distinguished Service is a high-level award to recognize significant, multiple contributions from individuals over an extended period of time. This award was named after Penny Crane, who was actively involved in SIGUCCS from the mid-70's until her untimely death in January 1999.

The ACM SIGUCCS Hall of Fame Award is an ongoing, web-based recognition of many individuals who have contributed significant time and energy in support of SIGUCCS activities.

Each year SIGUCCS sponsors Communication Awards to recognize outstanding publications developed at college and university computing centers. These awards recognize excellence in developing useful and attractive publications and provide SIGUCCS conference participants with an opportunity to review model publications that may help them develop or enhance their own work.

== History ==
Founded in 1963, SIGUCCS began as SIGUCC (Special Interest Group for University Computing Centers) but changed its name in 1981 to reflect the growing use of computing among large and small institutions of higher education. Originally meeting at ACM events, it began hosting its own conferences in 1973 (fall user services) and 1974 (spring management symposium). In 2011, the two conferences began to be held back-to-back and in 2016 the content from each was combined into a single conference that supports the needs of all information technology professionals in higher education, from help desk to leadership.
