= William C. Carter Award =

Secure computing prize

The William C. Carter Award is a technical award presented annually since 1997 to recognizing an individual who has made a significant contribution to the field of dependable and secure computing throughout his or her PhD dissertation. It is named after, and honors, the late William C. Carter, an important figure in the field. The award is sponsored by IEEE Technical Committee on Fault-Tolerant Computing (TC-FTC) and the IFIP Working Group on Dependable Computing and Fault Tolerance (WG 10.4).

== Past recipients ==
Year	Recipient (University)	Paper
2024	Romain Cayre (Institut national des sciences appliquées de Toulouse)	"“Offensive and defensive approaches for wireless communication protocols security in IoT”"
2023	Ben Gras (University of Amsterdam)	"Side Channel Security Risks in Commodity Microarchitectures"
2022	Minesh Patel (ETH Zurich)	"Enabling Effective Error Mitigation in Memory Chips That Use On-Die Error-Correcting Codes"
2021	Victor van der Veen (Vrije Universiteit Amsterdam)	"When Memory Serves Not So Well: Memory Errors 30 Years Later"
2020	Bo Fang (University of British Columbia)	"Approaches for Building Error Resilient Applications"
2019	João Catarino de Sousa (University of Lisbon)	"Byzantine state machine replication for the masses"
2018	Christoph Borchert (Technische Universität Dortmund)	"Aspect-Oriented Technology for Dependable Operating Systems"
2017	Homa Alemzadeh (University of Illinois at Urbana-Champaign)	"Data-Driven Resiliency Assessment of Medical Cyber-Physical Systems"
2016	Sebastiano Peluso (Virginia Tech)	"Efficient Protocols for Replicated Transactional Systems"
2015	Dmitrii Kuvaiskii (TU Dresden)	"Δ-encoding: Practical Encoded Processing"
2014	Cuong Pham (University of Illinois at Urbana Champaign)	"Reliability and Security Monitoring of Virtual Machines Using Hardware Architectural Invariants"
2013	Suman Saha (Laboratoire d'Informatique de Paris 6)	"Hector: Detecting Resource-Release Omission Faults in Error-Handling Code for Systems Software"
2012	Collin Mulliner (Technische Universität Berlin)	"Taming Mr Hayes: Mitigating Signaling Based Attacks on Smartphones "
2011	Gabriela Jacques da Silva (University of Illinois at Urbana-Champaign)	"Modeling Stream Processing Applications for Dependability Evaluation"
2010	Basel Alomair (University of Washington at Seattle)	"Scalable RFID Systems: A Privacy-Preserving Protocol with Constant-Time Identification"
2009	José Fonseca (University of Coimbra)	"Vulnerability & Attack Injection for Web Applications"
2008	Karthik Pattabiraman (University of Illinois at Urbana-Champaign)	"SymPLFIED: Symbolic Program Level Fault Injection and Error Detection Framework"
2007	Jorrit N. Herder (Vrije Universiteit)	"Failure Resilience for Device Drivers"
2006	Jonathan Chang (Princeton University)	"Automatic Instruction-Level Software-Only Recovery Methods"
2005	Alper T. Mizrak (University of California, San Diego)	"Fatih: Detecting and Isolating Malicious Routers"
	Mohan Rajagopalan (University of Arizona)	"Authenticated System Calls"
2004	Alex X. Liu (University of Texas at Austin)	"Diverse Firewall Design"
2003	João Durães (University of Coimbra)	"Definition of Software Fault Emulation Operators: A Field Data Study"
2002	John DeVale (Carnegie Mellon University)	"Robust Software – No More Excuses"
2001	Martin Hiller (Chalmers University)	"An Approach for Analysing the Propagation of Data Errors in Software"
2000	Wei Chen (Cornell University)	"On the Quality of Service of Failure Detectors"
1999	Wee Teck Ng (University of Michigan)	"The Systematic Improvement of Fault Tolerance in the Rio File Cache"
1998	Nuno Neves (University of Illinois at Urbana-Champaign)	"RENEW: A Tool for Fast and Efficient Implementation of Checkpoint Protocols"
1997	Bharat P. Dave (Princeton University)	"COFTA: Hardware-Software Co-Synthesis of Heterogeneous Distributed Embedded System Architectures for Low Overhead Fault Tolerance"
	Christof Fetzer (University of California at San Diego)	"Fail-Awareness: An Approach to Construct Fail-Safe Applications"

== See also ==
- List of computer science awards
