= Teaching Awards =

The Teaching Awards is an annual teacher awards ceremony in the United Kingdom.

The National Teaching Awards were established by Lord Puttnam CBE in 1998 and are managed by an independent charity, the Teaching Awards Trust.

The Oscar award winning actress Emma Thompson became the president of the Teaching Awards in 2009.

In 2008, the awards were hosted by Jeremy Vine and Myleene Klass. In 2009, the awards were hosted by Jeremy Vine and Christine Bleakley. In 2010, Lenny Henry presented the awards.

The presentations are televised on BBC Two under the programme title Britain's Classroom Heroes. During the programme, winning teachers are presented with a Plato award, designed by sculptor Glynis Owen and based on her work titled 'The Thinking Man.'

The Awards are supported by all the main political parties, the Department for Education in England, the Department of Education in Northern Ireland, the Scottish Executive and the Welsh Assembly Government as well as all the national teaching unions and associations.

== Presenters ==
- Jeremy Vine (2007–2009)
- Kate Thornton (2007)
- Elisabeth Sladen (2007)
- Myleene Klass (2008)
- Christine Bleakley (2009)
- Lenny Henry (2010–2011)
- Clare Balding (2012–2013)
- Dan Snow (2014–2015)
- Hugh Dennis (2016)
- Naga Munchetty (2017)
- Sean Fletcher (2017–)
- Anita Rani (2018)

== Process ==
Every year, all schools and FE colleges are invited to nominate their most outstanding headteachers, teachers, teaching assistants, lecturers and school teams. Anyone can make a nomination. Nominations are then endorsed by the senior management team to proceed to the next stage. The Awards year culminates in a televised ceremony, held in the Autumn, where awards are given out in various categories.

== Goals ==
The Teaching Awards Trust was initially established to regenerate national pride in the teaching profession. The Trust has been successful in achieving this aim and has repositioned itself as a centre of excellence in education with the following aims:

- promote teaching as a career
- disseminate best practice
- encourage the involvement of other stakeholders in education
- engage with a wider audience at a national level

== Funding ==
The Teaching Awards are funded through sponsorship, donations and grants. The current main sponsor is Pearson plc.
