= UNESCO King Sejong Literacy Prize =

The UNESCO King Sejong Literacy Prize (Korean: 유네스코 세종대왕 문해상) is an annual prize awarded to three institutions, organizations or individuals "for their contribution to the fight against illiteracy."

It is funded by the government of South Korea, which first offered the Prize in 1989, honouring the outstanding contribution made to literacy by King Sejong the Great, who created the Korean alphabet Hangul. The prize differs from other UNESCO literacy prizes, in that "it gives special consideration to the development and use of mother-tongue literacy education and training".

Each award consists of a sum of US$20,000, a silver medal and a certificate.

== Purpose and significance ==
The UNESCO King Sejong Literacy Prize aims to recognize outstanding contributions to the promotion of literacy, particularly in multilingual contexts and in the development of mother-tongue–based literacy programs. The prize highlights UNESCO's long-standing commitment to literacy as a foundation for human rights, social participation, and sustainable development. It also emphasizes the importance of culturally relevant education by supporting initiatives that use local languages and scripts.

== Recent laureates ==
=== 2017 ===
- Center for the Study of Learning (CSLP) at Concordia University (Canada) CSLP at Concordia University is awarded for Using Educational Technology to Develop Essential Educational Competencies in Sub-Saharan Africa project, which develops and distributes its material internationally free of charge
- We Love Reading (Jordan) is honoured as a programme with a virtual community that offers online read-aloud trainings for parents, mobilizes volunteers to read aloud in community spaces to children and provides age-appropriate material through a digital library.

=== 2016 ===
- Patani Malay-Thai Bi/Multilingual Education Project (PMT-MLE), Research Institute for Languages and Cultures of Asia, Mahidol University - Thailand
- Books for rural areas of Viet Nam, Center for Knowledge Assistance and Community Development - Viet Nam

=== 2013 ===
- Mother Tongue Literacy in the Guera Region programme, Federation of Associations for the Promotion of Guera Languages - Chad
- Saakshar Bharat (Literate India) Mission, National Literacy Mission Authority, Ministry of Human Resource Development - India

=== 2012 ===
- Directorate of Community Education Development - Indonesia
- National Adult Literacy Programme, Pentecostal Church - Rwanda
- Honourable Mention: Directorate of Literacy and Adult Education - Niger

=== 2011 ===
- National Literacy Service - Burundi
- National Institute for the Education of Adults - Mexico
- Honourable Mention: City Literacy Coordinating Council, Tagum City - Philippines

=== 2010 ===
- Virtual Assisted Literacy Programme, The North Catholic University Foundation, Antioquia - Colombia
- General Directorate of Adult Training - Cape Verde
- Family Literacy Project (FLY) - Hambourg

=== 2009 ===
- Nirantar - India
- Tin Tua - Burkina Faso

=== 2008 ===
- People's Action Forum, Reflect and HIV/AIDS - Zambia
- Honourable Mention: BBC-RAW (Reading and Writing) - UK

=== 2007 ===
- TOSTAN - Senegal
- The Children's Book Project - Tanzania

=== 2006 ===
- Youth and Adult Literacy and Education Chair of the Latin American and Caribbean Pedagogical Institute of the Republic of Cuba (IPLAC) - Cuba
- Mother Child Education Foundation - Turkey

=== 2005 ===
- AULA Cultural Association - Spain
- GOAL Sudan - Sudan

=== 2004 ===
- Alfabetização Solidária (AlfaSol)] - Brazil
- The Steering Group of Literacy Education in Qinghai Province - China

=== 2003 ===
- Tembaletu Community Education Centre - South Africa
- International Reflect Circle (CIRAC)

=== 2002 ===
- Regional Centre for Adult Education (ASFEC) - Egypt
- Bunyad Literacy Community Council (BLCC) - Pakistan

=== 2001 ===
- Tianshui Education Commission, Gansu Province - China
- Alfatitbonit/Alfa Desalin Project - Haiti

=== 2000 ===
- Juvenile Education - Iraq
- National Literacy and Basic Education Directorate - Senegal

== See also ==
- List of international literacy prizes
- International Literacy Day
- United Nations Literacy Decade
- UNESCO Nadezhda K. Krupskaya literacy prize
- UNESCO Confucius Prize for Literacy
- Noma Literacy Prize
