= UNESCO Prize for Girls' and Women's Education =

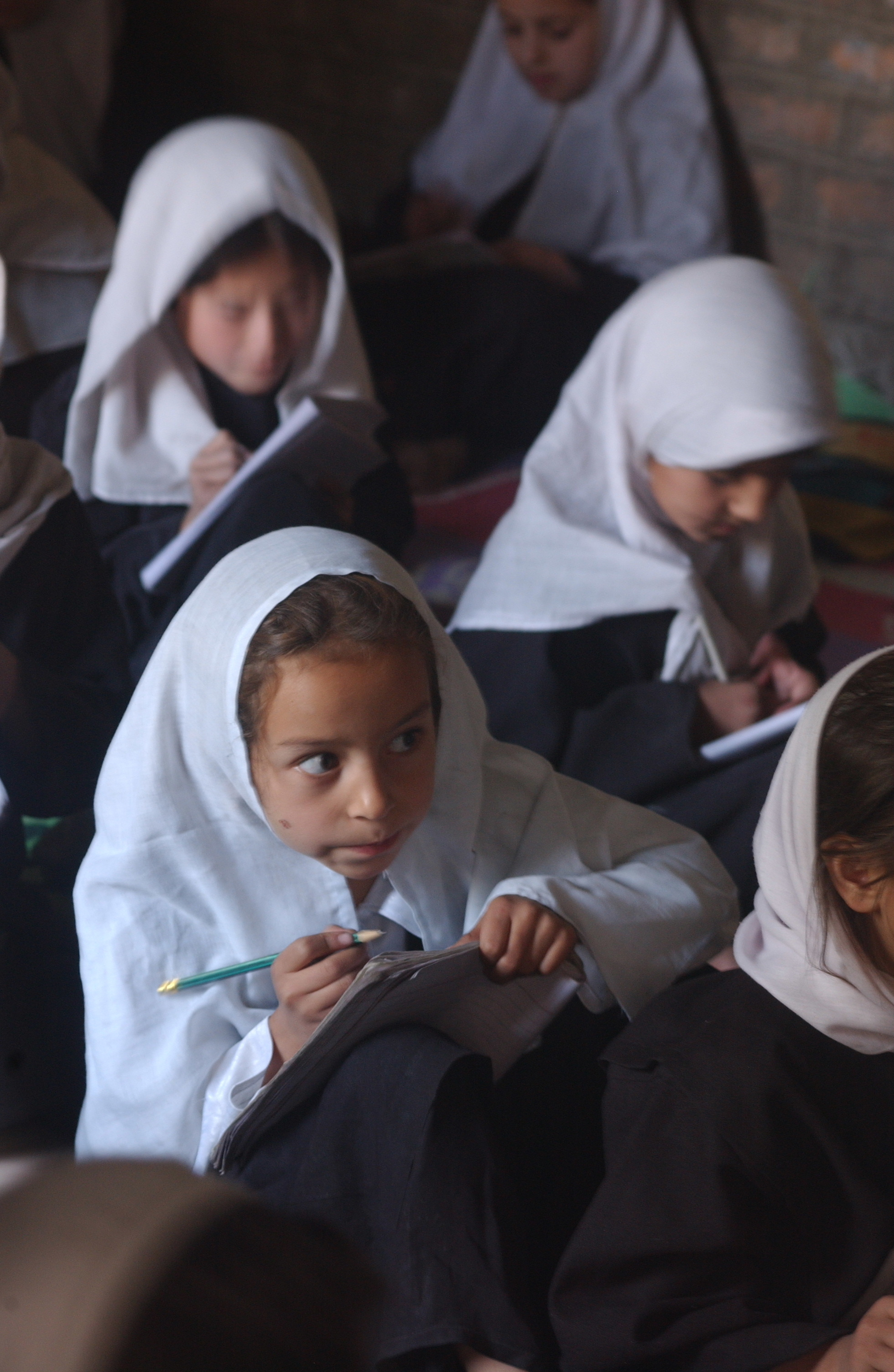
Girls’ classroom in Afghanistan

The UNESCO Prize for Girls’ and Women’s Education is an award, recognizing outstanding contributions to the advancement of female education. Supported by the Government of the People’s Republic of China, the Prize is conferred annually to two laureates. The prize awards USD 50,000 to each laureate to further their work in the area of girls’ and women’s education. Laureates are nominated by Member States, in consultation with their National Commissions, as well as non-governmental organizations in official partnership with UNESCO. They are recognized by UNESCO's Director General.

== Background and purpose ==
Gender equality in education is a basic right and a prerequisite to build inclusive societies. While progress has been made globally, large gender gaps still exist in education in many settings. Globally,133 million girls and 139 million boys are out of school. Women still account for almost two-thirds of all adults unable to read.

The UNESCO Prize for Girls’ and Women’s Education honours outstanding and innovative contributions made by individuals, institutions, and organizations to advance girls’ and women’s education. It is the first UNESCO Prize of this nature and is unique in showcasing successful projects that improve and promote the educational prospects of girls and women and in turn, the quality of their lives.

Funded by the Government of the People’s Republic of China, the Prize is conferred annually to two laureates and consists of an award of US $50,000 each to help further their work in the area of girls’ and women’s education. The Director-General of UNESCO awarded the Prize for the first time in 2016.

The Prize contributes to the attainment of the 2030 Sustainable Development agenda, particularly SDG goals 4 on education and 5 on gender equality.

== Nominations ==
The UNESCO Prize for Girls' and Women's Education's call for nominations opens every year on, or around 8 March as part of UNESCO's celebration of International Women's Day. Nominations are made by Governments of UNESCO Members States via their Permanent Delegation to UNESCO, and Non-Governmental Organizations (NGOs) in official partnership with UNESCO. Self-nominations are not accepted.

Nominations are assessed by an independent international Jury on the basis of a comprehensive selection criteria including (1) impact, (2) innovation and (3) sustainability. The selection of laureates is made by the UNESCO Director-General based on the jury's recommendation.

== Laureates ==
=== 2016 ===
The two laureates of the first edition of the Prize were selected in 2016 by the Director-General of UNESCO, Irina Bokova, on the basis of recommendations by an International Jury of experts. The two outstanding projects selected in 2016 were the Female Students Network Trust from Zimbabwe and the Directorate of Early Childhood Education Development from Indonesia, who received their award at an official ceremony in June 2016.

=== 2017 ===
The 2017 laureates included The Development and Education Programme for Daughters and Communities Center in the Greater Mekong Sub-Region (DEPDC/GMS) from Thailand and The Mini Academy of Science and Technology (MaCTec) from Peru. Both received their awards on the sidelines of the 9th BRICS Summit.

=== 2018 ===
The 2018 laureates are the Misr El Kheir Foundation in Egypt and the Women’s Centre of Jamaica Foundation in Jamaica. Both have been awarded during a ceremony at UNESCO Headquarters on the International Day of the Girl 2018.

=== 2019 ===
The 2019 laureates are Sulá Batsú from Costa Rica and the Department of Education of the Government of Navarre, Spain for their project SKOLAE.They received their rewards during a ceremony at UNESCO Headquarters on the International Day of the Girl 2019.

=== 2020 ===
The 2020 laureates are the Shilpa Sayura Foundation in Sri Lanka and the Girl Child Network from Kenya. They have been recognized through an online campaign linked to the International Day of the Girl Child of 2020.

=== 2021 ===
The 2021 laureates are Girl MOVE Academy from Mozambique and {reprograma} from Brazil. They were recognized during an online award ceremony on 15 October 2021, held as part of UNESCO’s celebration of International Day of the Girl.

=== 2022 ===
The 2022 laureates are Room to Read from Cambodia for its Girls’ Education Programme and Girls Livelihood and Mentorship Initiative (GLAMI) from Tanzania. Both have been awarded the prize during a ceremony held at UNESCO Headquarters on 11 October, as part of UNESCO’s celebration of the 10th International Day of the Girl Child.

=== 2023 ===
The 2023 laureates are the China Children Trust Fund from China and the Pakistan Alliance for Girls Education in Pakistan. Both laureates received their award at a ceremony in China’s Diaoyutai State Guesthouse.

=== 2024 ===
The 2024 laureates are CAMFED (Campaign for Female Education) Zambia and PEAS (Promoting Equality in African Schools) Uganda. Both laureates received their awards at a ceremony held as part of UNESCO's celebration of International Day of the Girl 2024.

=== 2025 ===
The 2025 laureates are All Girls Code from Lebanon and Nashipai Maasai Community Projects from Kenya. Both laureates received their award at a ceremony in China’s Diaoyutai State Guesthouse, marking the 10th anniversary of the Prize.
