= Carpenter Medal =

The Carpenter Medal was awarded by the Senate of the University of London once every three years. The recipient was a former student who had submitted a thesis (resulting in the award of a doctorate) of exceptional distinction in statistical, genetic, comparative or experimental psychology during the three-year period. This could include work on the physiology of the central nervous system and "special senses". It was accompanied by a prize of £20.

The medal was named after William Benjamin Carpenter, registrar of the university from 1856 until 1879. The Carpenter Testimonial Committee had allocated money for an annual prize in 1881, but the Carpenter Medal was not instituted until 1910, with the first award for the period ending 31 May 1913. The medal need not be awarded if the Senate did not consider that a sufficiently good thesis had been submitted during the three-year period.

Winners of the prize included

- Francis Aveling, 1912
- Nellie Carey
