= List of student science award programs =

List of student science award programs - a generic list of programs, fairs, and/or competitions for youth or students.

Some examples include the Intel International Science and Engineering Fair or European Union Contest for Young Scientists, India International Sarabhai Student Scientist Award. Discovery Education 3M Young Scientist Challenge is another, and it used to be called Discovery Channel Young Scientist Challenge (DCYSC), which was targeted at grades 5-8 (in the US system). MIT Lincoln Lab has named asteroids it discovered as a reward for the competition.

Examples:

- Intel International Science and Engineering Fair
- Discovery Education 3M Young Scientist Challenge
- European Union Contest for Young Scientists
- India International Sarabhai Student Scientists Award
- Siemens Westinghouse Competition (Siemens Competition)
- New Zealand Science Fair
- Belgian Science Fair
- Blavatnik Awards for Young Scientists
