= Luke Rivington =

British priest

Luke Rivington (17 July 1838 in London – 30 May 1899 in London) was an English Anglican and later Roman Catholic priest and controversy writer.

== Life ==
He was the fourth son of Francis Rivington, a London publisher, and a collateral descendant of James Rivington, Loyalist New York publisher during the American Revolution. He was born on 17 July 1838 and baptised on 4 October at St James Piccadilly, London. He was educated at Highgate Grammar School and Magdalen College, Oxford. After his ordination as an Anglican clergyman in 1862, he became curate of St. Clement's, Oxford. His sisters Mary and Rita lived with him at Oxford.

In 1867 Rivington left St. Clement's for All Saints, Margaret Street, London, where he attracted attention as a preacher. His sister Mary then joined the Society of All Saints Sisters of the Poor. Shortly after being professed, Sister Mary Christina died of typhoid fever, contracted while nursing at University College Hospital. Rivington attended his sister during her illness. Failing in his efforts to found a religious community at Stoke, Staffordshire, he joined the Cowley Fathers and became superior of their house in Bombay.

Becoming unsettled in his religious convictions he visited Rome, where in 1888 he was received into the Catholic Church. His ordination to the Catholic priesthood took place on 21 September 1889. He returned to England and settled in Bayswater, not undertaking any parochial work, but devoting himself to preaching, hearing confessions, and writing controversial works.

In 1897, Pope Leo XIII conferred on him an honorary doctorate in divinity. During his latter years he lived near St. James Church, Spanish Place.

== Works ==
His works of controversy included:

- "Authority; or a plain reason for joining the Church of Rome" (1888);
- "Dust", a letter to Charles Gore on his book "Roman Catholic Claims" (1888);
- "Dependence; or the insecurity of the Anglican Position" (1889);
- "The Primitive Church and the See of Peter" (1894);
- "Anglican Fallacies; or Lord Halifax on Reunion" (1895);
- "Rome and England or Ecclesiastical Continuity" (1897);
- "The Roman Primacy A.D. 430-51" (1899) which was practically a new edition of "The Primitive Church and the See of Peter".

He also wrote several pamphlets and brought out a new edition of John Milner's "End of Religious Controversy". This was for the Catholic Truth Society of which he was long a member of the committee.

His pamphlets include:

- "Primitive and Roman" (1894) a reply to the notice of his book "The Primitive Church" in the "Church Quarterly Review";
- "The Conversion of Cardinal Newman" (1896);
- "Tekel" (1897) in which he criticized the reply of the Archbishops of Canterbury and York to Pope Leo XIII after the condemnation of Anglican Orders.
