= Noma Literacy Prize =

Prize awarded by UNESCO for combating illiteracy

The Noma Literacy Prize is a UNESCO award. It goes to the group or individual who has done most to combat illiteracy. It is one of a series of Noma Prizes. It was founded in 1980 by Shoichi Noma, the president of the publishing firm Kodansha, Japan's largest publisher of literature and manga.

== Select recipients ==
- 1985 — NUFI Institution of the Republic of Cameroun.
- 1993 — Indian National Federation of UNESCO Clubs and Associations (INFUCA)
- 1999 — India's National Literacy Mission Programme.

== See also ==
- Noma Prize
- UNESCO Nadezhda K. Krupskaya literacy prize
- UNESCO Confucius Prize for Literacy
- UNESCO King Sejong Literacy Prize
