= UNESCO Nadezhda K. Krupskaya literacy prize =

UNESCO Nadezhda K. Krupskaya literacy prize' was named after Russian politician of the Soviet era Nadezhda K. Krupskaya. The prize was sponsored by the government of the Soviet Union in the period 1970-1992. The prize was offered in UNESCO along with Mohammad Reza Pahlavi Shah of Iran literacy prize which was offered until the Iranian revolution of 1979.

== List of Winners and Honourable Mentions ==
Year	Winner	Honourable Mention	Ref
1970	Language and Literature Institute of the Mongolian Academy of Sciences, Mongolian People's Republic	Mobile rural schools, Mexico; Amir Birdjandi, Iran; Anna Lorenzetto, President of the National Union for the Struggle against Illiteracy, Italy; National Adult Literacy and Education Services, People's Republic of the Congo; Union of Sudanese Women, Sudan	
1971	Zambia Adult Literacy Programme, Zambia	Angolan Women's Organization, Angola; Ministry of Education and Fine Arts, Dominican Republic; Literacy Section of the State of Kuwait	
1972	Education Corps Iran	The Technical Workers' Collective, Department of Adult Education. Cuba; Kibaru (The News), Mali; The National Board of Primary Education and Teacher Training, Uruguay; Mr. Alfa Sow, Society of African Culture	
1973	Literacy Project, West Lake Region, Tanzania	Adult and Community Education Division, Philippines; The Anti-illiteracy Programme by Radio, Egypt; Ye Kotebe Berhane Amin Youth Association, Ethiopia; National Federation of Indian Women, India	
1974	Shyorongi Community Development Centre, (CEDECOS), Rwanda	National Directorate of Adult Education, Argentina; Mr. J. P. Crossenbacher (expert from the Swiss Technical Co-operation Programme, proposed by Dahomey); Bengal Social Service League, India; Mr. Mohammad Bahman Beighi, Iran	
1975	Abdirizak Mohamoud Abukar, Somali Democratic Republic	Directorate of Literacy and Lifelong Education, People's Republic of the Congo; Kerala Granthasala Sangham (Libraries Association of the State of Kerala), India; Institution for Workers' Education, Iraq; National Service for Literacy, Togo	
1976	Literacy Department of the Ministry of Ecuation and Culture, Syrian Arab Republic	Directorate of Non-formal (Adult) Education, India; Jamaica Movement for the Advancement of Literacy (JAMAL); Somali Women's Organization, nominated by the Women's International Democratic Federation; Zambia Association of Literacy Clubs	
1977	award deferred, later awarded in 1979	Mr. Bernard Sero Gauthier, People's Republic of Benin; Telimele Regional Centre for Improving the Status of Women, Guinea; Seva Mandir (for the development of Adult Education), Udaipur, India; General Union of Women of Yemen, People's Democratic Republic of Yemen, nominated by the Women's International Democratic Foundation	
1978	The Commune of Cambinh, Pilot Literacy and Complementary Education Unit, submitted by the Socialist Republic of Viet Nam	The Mutual Aid and Development Centre, Burundi; Andhra Mahila Sabha, Hyderabad, India; The Syrian Federation of Women	
1979	The Supreme Council of the National Campaign for Compulsory Literacy of Iraq, Iraq; The Popular Union of Peruvian Women, Peru	Directorate of Literacy and the Rural Press, Benin; Functional Literacy Programme, Adult Education Division, Department of Non-formal Education in Thailand, Thailand; The Commune of Cat Hanh, Socialist Republic of Viet Nam	
1980	Nicaraguan Literacy Campaign, Nicaragua	National Literacy Centre of Angola, Angola	
1981	Federation of Cuban Women, Cuba	Research Centre for Adult Education of the People's Republic of the Congo, People's Republic of the Congo; Mr. Nail Mahmood al-Saidi, Iraq	
1982	Directorate of Non-Formal and Adult Education of Tamil Nadu, India	All Ethiopian Peasants Association, Ethiopia; Directorate of Adult Education, United Republic of Tanzania	
1983		Vương Kiêm Toàn, Director of Common People Learning Bureau (Nha bình dân học vụ), SR Viet Nam	
1984	Cuban National Association of the Blind, Cuba	Directorate of Adult Education of the State of Uttar Pradesh, India; Directorate of Popular Education and Literacy, Madagascar	
1985	Xiengkho District, Lao People's Democratic Republic	Brother Jean-Baptiste Bunkungu, Burkina Faso; Literacy Programme for Adults, Maharashtra, India	
1986	Wu Lien County, Shandong Province, China	Democratic Women's Organization of Afghanistan, Afghanistan; Carlos Fonseca Task Force, Nicaragua; Miss Ghada Raghib al-Jabi, Syria	
1987	Mrs Eriyah, Indonesia		
1988	National Literacy Centre, Angola	Educar Foundation Basic Education Project, Baixada Fluminense, Brazil; Professor Ramlal Parikh, India (submitted by the Association for World Education); The Executive Committee for the Eradication of Illiteracy and Complementary Education, Binh Minh District, Cuu Long Province, Socialist Republic of Vietnam	

== See also ==
- UNESCO Confucius Prize for Literacy, China
- UNESCO King Sejong Literacy Prize, South Korea
- Noma Literacy Prize
