= American Sociological Association Distinguished Scholarly Book Award =

The Distinguished Scholarly Book Award is presented annually by the American Sociological Association (ASA) in recognition of an ASA member's outstanding book published within two years prior to the award year.

== Description ==
In 1956, the ASA presented its first annual book award, the MacIver Award. Since then, this award has gone through a number of changes, and is now known as the Distinguished Scholarly Book Award.

As it is currently named, the Distinguished Scholarly Book Award of the ASA was first given in 1986, and is presented at the ASA Annual Meeting every August. It is an ASA Major Award, given at association-level, in contrast to the various section-level ASA awards.

Members of the ASA make nominations for the prize. The Distinguished Scholarly Book Award selection committee, whose members serve two-year terms, selects award recipients.

== Recipients ==
- 2020 – Trans Kids: Being Gendered in the Twenty-First Century by Tey Meadow
- 2020 – Pathways of Desire: The Sexual Migration of Mexican Gay Men by Hector Carrillo
- 2020 (honorable mention) – Multinational Maids: Stepwise Migration in a Global Labor Market by Anju Mary Paul
- 2019 – Crook County: Racism and Injustice in America's Largest Criminal Court by Nicole Gonzalez Van Cleve
- 2018 – Working Law: Courts, Corporations, and Symbolic Civil Rights by Lauren B. Edelman
- 2017 – Culling the Masses: The Democratic Origins of Racial Immigration Policy in the Americas by David Cook-Martin and David Scott FitzGerald
- 2016 – Love, Money and HIV: Becoming a Modern African Woman in the Age of AIDS by Sanyu A. Mojola
- 2015 – Paying for the Party: How College Maintains Inequality by Elizabeth A. Armstrong and Laura T. Hamilton
- 2014 – The Land of Too Much: American Abundance and the Paradox of Poverty by Monica Prasad
- 2014 – Great American City: Chicago and the Enduring Neighborhood Effect by Robert J. Sampson
- 2014 (honorable mention) – The Opera Fanatic: Ethnography of an Obsession by Claudio E. Benzecray
- 2013 – Capitalizing on Crisis: the Political Origins of the Rise of Finance by Greta R. Krippner
- 2013 (honorable mention) – Peculiar Institution: America's Death Penalty in an Age of Abolition by David W. Garland
- 2012 – Investing in Equal Opportunity by Frank Dobbin
- 2012 – Impossible Engineering: Technology and Territoriality on the Canal du Midi by Chandra Mukerji
- 2011 – Violence: A Micro-sociological Theory by Randall Collins
- 2011 – Economists and Societies: Discipline and Profession in the United States, Britain and France, 1890s to 1990s by Marion Fourcade
- 2010 – Inheriting the City: The Children of Immigrants Come of Age by Philip Kasinitz, John H. Mollenkopf, Mary C. Waters, and Jennifer Holdaway
- 2009 – Inclusion: The Politics of Difference in Medical Research by Steven Epstein
- 2008 – Mexican New York: Transnational Lives of New Immigrants by Robert Courtney Smith
- 2007 – Black Sexual Politics: African Americans, Gender and the New Racism by Patricia Hill Collins
- 2007 – The Chosen: The Hidden History of Admission and Exclusion at Harvard, Yale, and Princeton by Jerome Karabel
- 2006 – Race in Another America:The Significance of Skin Color in Brazil by Edward Telles
- 2006 (honorable mention) – Locked in Place: State-Building and Late Industrialization in India by Vivek Chibber
- 2005 – Forces of Labor: Workers' Movements and Globalization since 1870 by Beverly J. Silver
- 2004 – States and Women’s Rights: The Making of Postcolonial Tunisia, Algeria, and Morocco by Mounira M. Charrad
- 2003 – Capitalists in Spite of Themselves: Elite Conflict and Economic Transitions in Early Modern Europe by Richard Lachmann
- 2002 – Legacies: The Story of the Immigrant Second Generation by Alejandro Portes and Rubén G. Rumbaut
- 2001 – Legalizing Gender Inequality: Courts, Markets, and Unequal Pay for Women in America by Robert L. Nelson and William P. Bridges
- 2000 – Durable Inequality by Charles Tilly
- 1999 – The Sociology of Philosophies: A Global Theory of Intellectual Change by Randall Collins
- 1998 – Abolition of Feudalism: Peasants, Lords and Legislators in the French Revolution by John Markoff
- 1998 (honorable mention) – Making Ends Meet by Kathryn Edin and Laura Lein
- 1998 (honorable mention) – The Cultural Contradictions of Motherhood by Sharon Hays
- 1998 (honorable mention) – Class Counts by Erik Olin Wright
- 1997 – Black Wealth/White Wealth: A New Perspective on Racial Inequality by Thomas M. Shapiro and Melvin L. Oliver
- 1997 (honorable mention) – The Challenger Launch Decision: Risky Technology, Culture, and Deviance at NASA by Diane Vaughan
- 1996 – Status and Sacredness: A General Theory of Status Relations and an Analysis of Indian Culture by Murray Milner, Jr.
- 1995 – American Apartheid: Segregation and the Making of the Underclass by Douglas S. Massey and Nancy A. Denton
- 1995 – Sociology and the Race Problem by James B. McKee
- 1994 – Slim's Table: Race, Respectability, and Masculinity by Mitchell Duneier
- 1993 – Revolution and Rebellion in the Early Modern World by Jack Goldstone
- 1992 – Foundations of Social Theory by James S. Coleman
- 1991 – The System of Professions: An Essay on the Division of Expert Labor by Andrew Abbott
- 1990 – Urban Fortunes: The Political Economy of Place by John R. Logan and Harvey L. Molotch
- 1990 (special recognition) – Legal Secrets: Equality and Efficiency in the Common Law by Kim Scheppele
- 1989 – The Contentious French by Charles Tilly
- 1988 – The Sources of Social Power, Volume 1 by Michael Mann
- 1987 – Communist Neo-Traditionalism: Work and Authority in Chinese Industry by Andrew G. Walder
- 1986 – Origins of the Civil Rights Movement: Black Communities Organizing for Change by Aldon D. Morris
- 1986 – The Divorce Revolution: The Unexpected Social and Economic Consequences for Women and Children in America by Lenore J. Weitzman

== See also ==
- List of social sciences awards
