= U.S. presidential IQ hoax =

False claims about American presidents' intelligence

In mid-2001, an e-mail and internet hoax that purported to provide a list of estimated IQs of the U.S. presidents from Franklin D. Roosevelt to George W. Bush began circulating online.

== Hoax ==
The hoax email showed Bill Clinton having the IQ 182, and George W. Bush 91. However, the numbers claimed in the email were fabricated, and the sociologists and institutions (e.g., the "Lovenstein Institute") quoted in the article do not exist. The techniques purportedly used to measure the IQ of the presidents are not recognized means of measuring IQs. The hoax also contains other factual errors. When the hoax was debunked, it appeared that Bush's IQ and college entrance test scores were never released.

== Coverage ==
Perhaps because some pundits and politicians claimed George W. Bush had low intelligence, the hoax was unquestioned by many. The British newspaper The Guardian, for example, quoted the report in its diary section of July 19, 2001, and used it to belittle Bush, although the paper published a retraction two days after the Associated Press drew attention to the error. Other media outlets to fall for the hoax included Bild (Germany), Pravda (Russia), and the Southland Times (New Zealand) as well as a few U.S. newspapers.

The IQ hoax was revived in March 2007 in Spanish-language media when the news agency EFE distributed a piece referring to it. Dozens of outlets (primarily in their online versions) reproduced EFE's text. Among the newspapers publishing the hoax were El País (Spain's leading newspaper), ABC, La Vanguardia, and El Mercurio (Chile's leading newspaper).

== IQ estimations by academics ==
In 2001, political psychologist Aubrey Immelman made an IQ estimation of G. W. Bush based on the SAT Reasoning Test results of Bush (1206) and Al Gore, who achieved IQ scores of 133 and 134 in his school years, and an SAT of 1355: "It's tempting to employ Al Gore's IQ:SAT ratio of 134:1355 as a formula for estimating Bush's probable intelligence quotient—an exercise in fuzzy statistics that predicts a score of 119."

A 2006 study analyzing presidential IQs by Dean Keith Simonton of U.C. Davis appeared in the journal Political Psychology. Simonton's study analyzed the results of varied and often subjective historical material using the tools of historiometry. It estimated IQs for all US presidents, and validated the headline of the hoax, which stated Bush's was the lowest of any president in the last 50 years, though it estimates his IQ considerably higher (by nearly two standard deviations) than the 91 suggested in the hoax report. It rated G.W. Bush second to last since 1900, with an estimated IQ of 119 (the estimates ranged from 111 to 139). Bush's estimated IQ was less than those estimated for Grant (120), Monroe (124), and Harding (124). The same study estimated president Bill Clinton's IQ at 149, behind only those of Kennedy (151), Jefferson (154) and John Quincy Adams (169).

Simonton's 2006 study follows earlier studies done on this subject, including a 1926 study by Catharine Cox Miles. This study concluded that there is a statistically significant correlation of 0.56 between a U.S. president's IQ and his perceived amount of success. It is worth noting that other sources and/or studies might have different results for the IQs of United States presidents. For instance, John F. Kennedy's IQ has also been estimated to have been significantly lower than in this 2006 study (Chester Arthur biographer Thomas C. Reeves refers to an actual IQ test by Kennedy with a score of 119), while Richard Nixon's IQ has also been estimated to have been significantly higher than in this study.

== See also ==
- Intelligence Quotient (IQ) and Browser Usage, another IQ-related Internet hoax, this time claiming low IQs for users of Internet Explorer 6.
