= StraighterLine =

American educational company

- Type: Higher education courses for college transfer credit
- Founded: 2009
- Founder: Burck Smith, David Parento
- Headquarters: 1201 South Sharp Street Suite 110, Baltimore, MD 21230, United States
- Website: straighterline.com

StraighterLine is a for-profit U.S. educational company that offers low-price, online higher education courses that are accepted as general education credit at some accredited institutions. The American Council on Education’s College Credit Recommendation Service (ACE CREDIT) has evaluated and recommended college credit for StraighterLine courses. (Note: StraighterLine - About Us) The company is unaccredited, but partners with some accredited institutions, primarily for-profit and small private colleges, that accept its courses for credit. Some of its previous partners have dropped the partnership citing loss of revenue and concerns about StraighterLine course quality

== Courses ==
The company primarily offers McGraw-Hill generated course content delivered via a Moodle learning management system, rather than offering courses developed by professors. StraighterLine charges a flat monthly rate, plus a charge for each course taken. Straighterline requires proctoring for a course final exam. eTextbooks and tutoring are included with course purchase.

StraighterLine offers more than 60 online college courses as of August 2022. (Note: StraighterLine - Course List)

The company has strategic partnerships with the Educational Testing Service and the makers of the Collegiate Learning Assessment, as part of a plan to expand into offering validated tests from leading educational organizations.

== Professor Direct ==
In 2012, StraighterLine launched professor led courses under the name Professor Direct. Professor Direct was the first time a business or school allowed professors to set their own prices for courses that could potentially lead to college credit. As of March, 2026, no mention of Professor Direct can be found on the StraighterLine website.

== Partners ==
StraighterLine has a network of over 150 partner colleges (Note: StraighterLine - Partner Colleges) that guarantee full credit transfer, and the company website claims that over 3,000 institutions have accepted StraighterLine credits in the past. In 2016, the U.S. Department of Education selected StraighterLine to participate in the EQUIP program to test a financial aid partnership with Dallas County Community College District and the Council for Higher Education Accreditation. The EQUIP experiment, which the US Department of Education considered a failure, allowed students to use federal student aid to enroll in courses offered by unaccredited partners of accredited institutions of higher education. Dallas County Community College District withdrew from the experiment before the program became operational.

The online course provider has served over 150,000 students as of 2021.

== History ==
The company was founded in 2009 by Burck Smith and David Parento as a division of Smarthinking, Inc., an online tutoring provider, and was spun out in 2010, shortly before Smarthinking was acquired by Pearson PLC. In 2011, the company was named one of "The 10 Most Innovative Companies in Education" by Fast Company (magazine). In 2017, the company was named an "Innovator Worth Watching" by The Christensen Institute. StraighterLine has had multiple rounds of investment, and in April 2012 received a 10-million dollar investment. Investors include: FirstMark Capital, City Light Capital, and Chrysalis Ventures.

The company showed growth in its first 5 years, in January 2012 StraighterLine was at 11 employees, by July 2012 it was at 22. As of September 2017, the company was at 50.

== CEO ==
Heather Combs was named CEO, March 15, 2022 of StraighterLine. Shweta Kabadi of BV Investment Partners, a current investor, was the interim CEO, as of December 19, 2023. (Note: About Us) The current CEO is Matt Hulett of Rosetta Stone.

== Criticism ==
Courses such as Straighterline are highly controversial with educators, including concerns about course quality, cheating, and lack of tracking. Additionally, complaints from students whose credits from courses they completed did not transfer to degree-granting institutions have been registered in online reviews. The company retains an A+ rating with the Better Business Bureau and is rated1.2 out of 5 stars on Consumer Affairs.
