= Common Data Set =

Common data definitions for US colleges and universities

The Common Data Set (CDS) is an annual product of the Common Data Set Initiative, "a collaborative effort among data providers in the higher education community and publishers as represented by the College Board, Peterson's, and U.S. News & World Report." The stated goal is to provide accurate and timely data to students and their families while decreasing the workload of administrators. Publishers use the standards and data items defined by the CDS to "ask the same core questions" (in addition to their own proprietary ones) when making their rankings and publications of institutions. Response data are also used in public accountability efforts such as the Voluntary System of Accountability's College Portrait.

== Annual CDS survey results ==
Each year, the Common Data Set Initiative makes small changes to the surveys submitted for every contributing college and university to complete. While the resulting database of all responses is not available to the public, individual colleges and universities typically publish their responses on their own website.

These individual responses can provide useful information for students applying to a particular college or university. For example, section C7 indicates the admission process the college places on items like class rank, GPA, and extra-curricular activities, while sections C9 to C12 give a statistical breakdown of SAT/ACT scores, class rank, and GPA for the current freshman class. Taken together, these can be a good indicator of what is typically needed for admission. Further sections illustrate the typical costs and potential aid an applicant might receive based on the current freshman class statistics.

== Survey sections and topics ==
The CDS annual survey includes the following major sections (A–J) and their subsections (0, 1, 2, ...):

- A – General College Information: Address, Classification of Undergraduate Institution, Academic Year Calendar, Degrees Offered
- B – Enrollment and Persistence: Current Institutional Enrollment – Men and Women, Enrollment by Racial/Ethnic Category, Number of Degrees Awarded, Graduation Rates, Retention Rates
- C – First-Time, First-Year (Freshman) Admissions: Freshman Student Applicants (Admitted, Enrolled, Wait-Listed), Relative Importance of Common Academic and Non-Academic Admission Criteria, Admission Requirements (Diploma, GED, College Prep Program), HS Academic Subject Requirements, Open Enrollment, SAT & ACT Policies (Requirements, Deadlines), Existing Freshman Class Statistical Profile (SAT & ACT Scoring Breakdown, Class Rank Breakdown, HS GPA Breakdown), Average GPA, Admission Policies (Application Fees, Closing Dates, Notification Date(s)), Other Admission Policies
- D – Transfer Admissions: Transfer Students Accepted or Not, Number from Last Year, Transfer Enrollment Term(s), Other Transfer Requirements and Deadlines, Transfer Credit Policies
- E – Academic Offerings and Policies: Special Study Options, Academic Areas Required for Graduation
- F – Student Life: Freshman Information (Fraternities, On/Off Campus Housing, Full/Part-Time), Activities Offered, ROTC, Housing Types Offered
- G – Annual Expenses: Undergraduate Full-Time Costs (Tuition, Required Fees, Room and Board), Changes in Tuition by Instructional Program, Estimated Expenses for Residents and Commuters, Per-Credit Hour Fees
- H – Financial Aid: Need-Based and Non-Need Based Financial Aid Offered in $'s, Number of Enrolled Students and Average Aid Awarded (Need and Non-Need Based), Financial Aid Filing Deadlines, Types of Aid Available, Scholarships and Grant Available, Criteria used in Awarding Institutional Aid
- I – Instructional Faculty and Class Size: Faculty Demographics (Men/Women, Degrees, Full/Part-Time), Student-to-Faculty Ratio, Class Counts by Section/Sub-Section Size
- J – Degrees Conferred by Disciplinary Areas

== See also ==
- Common data model
