= Fredrik deBoer =

American author

- Born: June 2, 1981 (age 45); Middletown, Connecticut, U.S.
- Other name: Freddie deBoer
- Occupation: Author
- Years active: 2008–present

Academic background
- Education: Central Connecticut State University (BA); University of Rhode Island (MA); Purdue University (PhD)
- Thesis: The CLA+ and the Two Cultures: Writing Assessment and Educational Testing (2015)
- Doctoral advisor: Richard Johnson-Sheehan

Academic work
- Discipline: English literature
- Sub-discipline: Composition studies, educational assessment, higher education policy
- Website: fredrikdeboer.com

Fredrik deBoer (born June 2, 1981) is an American left-wing author and cultural critic known for his heterodox commentary on education policy, social justice, and mental health.

== Early life and education ==
DeBoer was born in Middletown, Connecticut on June 2, 1981 to Lois (née Tinkham) and Fredrik Eugene "Fritz" deBoer (1937–1997), a professor of theater at Wesleyan University, and was raised there alongside his two brothers and sister.

DeBoer earned his Bachelor of Arts degree in English at Central Connecticut State University, his Master of Arts degree in writing and rhetoric at the University of Rhode Island, and his Doctor of Philosophy degree in English at Purdue University. His dissertation was titled The CLA+ and the Two Cultures: Writing Assessment and Educational Testing.

== Views and career ==
DeBoer identifies himself as a "Marxist of an old-school variety".

DeBoer has written for magazines, newspapers and websites. Topics include American education policy, cancel culture, and police reform. He was the communications editor for Kairos: A Journal of Rhetoric, Technology, and Pedagogy until 2017.

DeBoer's book, The Cult of Smart, was published in 2020 by All Points Books. Gideon Lewis-Kraus, writing for The New Yorker, says the book "argues that the education-reform movement has been trammelled by its willful ignorance of genetic variation." Lewis-Kraus groups deBoer with "hereditarian left" authors such as Kathryn Paige Harden and Eric Turkheimer in their shared emphasis on the importance of recognizing the heritability of intelligence when formulating social policy. Nathan J. Robinson, the editor-in-chief of the left-wing, progressive Current Affairs, vehemently disputed the accuracy of deBoer's position, saying "the central argument of the book is not just wrong, but wrong in the strongest possible sense of that term." His next book, critical of individuals and institutions taking advantage of Black Lives Matter, How Elites Ate the Social Justice Movement (his preferred title being No Justice, No Peace, No Progress), was published in 2023.

DeBoer has been a teacher at both the high school and college level.

DeBoer has written publicly about his struggle with bipolar disorder. While he has stated that he stopped using Twitter and other social media in 2017 for the sake of his health, he returned to Bluesky in 2025 in anticipation of his then-forthcoming novel, The Mind Reels (Coffee House Press).

== Books ==
- The Cult of Smart: How Our Broken Education System Perpetuates Social Injustice. All Points Books, an imprint of St. Martin's Publishing Group. 2020. ISBN 9781250200372.
- How Elites Ate the Social Justice Movement. Simon & Schuster. 2023. ISBN 9781668016015.
- The Mind Reels. Coffee House Press. 2025. ISBN 9781566897372.
- All in Your Head: Illness as Identity, Trauma as Fashion, and the Desire to be Disordered. Simon & Schuster. 2026. ISBN 9781668081037.
