= Robin Murphy Williams =

American sociologist (1914–2006)

Robin Murphy Williams (October 11, 1914 – June 3, 2006) was an American sociologist who is primarily known for identifying and defining 15 core values that are central to the American way of life.

== Life ==
Williams was born on October 11, 1914, in the city of Hillsborough, North Carolina. He graduated from North Carolina State University in 1933 at the age of 19 before going on earn an M.A. at Harvard University in 1939 and his PhD from the same establishment in 1943.

Following the work and studies he did on soldiers during the Second World War, Williams went on to take up a role as a professor at Cornell University, where he taught from 1946 to 1985. In 1990 he joined the University of California, Irvine, where he would continue to publish books until the very end of his life. His sister Helen Coble reveals that his final publication was made when he reached the age of 89. Williams died at the age of 91.

== Career/works ==
As Philip Kasinitz states "From his earliest academic work to his chairing the committee in 1989, Robin Williams Jr insisted on confronting the centrality of race in the U.S society." Fresh out of Harvard University, Robin Williams found his way to the war torn battlefields from where he would begin his analysis on the reasons that push soldiers to fight in the war. This would give him the sufficient data needed for his first publication The American Soldier: adjustment during army life. In this work he comes to the realization that what pushes man to participate in the violence of war is not the protection of the abstract notion of a nation, but rather the concrete idea which is direct protection of his comrades in the battlefield and the indirect protection of their loved ones at home. "People fought to save their buddies, because of relational solidarity," The study offered key findings that "essentially created the social science foundations for the way military infantry are trained."

The elaboration of Robin William's 12 core American Values remains Perhaps his most influential and pivotal work with regards to the effect on the sociological spheres. Robin William's established what he believed encompassed the 9 core values that drove the American individuals in 1970 before adding 3 more in 1975. He presented them in this manner: Equal opportunity, achievement and success, material comfort, activity and work, practicality and efficiency, progress, science, democracy and enterprise and finally freedom. Williams proceeded by adding these core values after 1975: religiosity, education, religious love and monogamy.

These values would go on to be an important part of the sociological approach of the American population, earning substantial space in manuals and other books alike. However, it would not be without criticism. Indeed, Williams' theory has received criticism for the lack of inclusion of the different races and ethnicities which are an integral part of the American culture which, however, do not comply with the same principles of religiosity, for example.
