= Coming Apart =

Coming Apart may refer to:

- Coming Apart (film), a feature film directed by Milton Moses Ginsberg
- Coming Apart (album), debut album by experimental rock duo Body/Head
- Coming Apart (book), a book by Charles Murray about the class stratification of white Americans
- Coming Apart (novel), a novel by Ann M. Martin
