= Paying for the Party =

2013 book

Paying for the Party: How College Maintains Inequality is a 2013 book by sociologists Elizabeth A. Armstrong and Laura T. Hamilton. Published by Harvard University Press, Paying for the Party is based on a five-year ethnographic study at an unnamed public flagship university in the Midwestern United States. In Paying for the Party, the authors report that students followed one of three "pathways" at the university: the professional pathway, the mobility pathway, or the party pathway.

Paying for the Party was preceded by sociologists Richard Arum and Josipa Roksa's 2011 book Academically Adrift, which focused on stagnating academic development of American undergraduate students. Armstrong and Hamilton had originally planned to study sexuality; they later chose to focus on social class "based on what they saw". While Armstrong and Hamilton used the pseudonym Midwestern University (MU), readers identified the study site as Indiana University due to the book's mention of the school's unique Department of Apparel Merchandising and Interior Design.

The book received the American Sociological Association Distinguished Scholarly Book Award in 2015. A reviewer for The Review of Higher Education said the book was "persuasive and much needed", but flawed due to the authors' "underdeveloped anthropological assumptions [which] fail to muster a critique capable of truly challenging the behavior of Indiana University's Kappa Delta sorority and the comparable, or even worse, behavior of other Greek organizations". A favorable review from Research & Practice in Assessment called the study "an exemplar of qualitative, ethnographic research in higher education", writing that "the party pathway described in the text clearly dominated at the institution in the study and likely dominates on many college campuses across the country". Reviewing Paying for the Party for the politically conservative organization National Association of Scholars, Amy Wax and Isaac N. Cohen called the book "engrossing and well-written" but stated its "fatal flaw" was in its focus on wealthy sorority members who made up a minority of students at the university.
