= John R. Logan =

American sociologist (born 1946)

- Born: John Richard Logan; 1946 (age 79–80)

Academic background
- Education: University of California, Berkeley; Columbia University
- Thesis: Industrialization, Repression, and Working Class Militancy in Spain (1974)
- Doctoral advisor: Arthur Stinchcombe
- Other advisor: Immanuel Wallerstein

Academic work
- Discipline: Sociology
- Sub-discipline: Political sociology; sociology of race and ethnicity; sociology of the family; urban sociology
- Institutions: University at Albany, SUNY; Brown University
- Doctoral students: Min Zhou
- Main interests: Housing discrimination in the United States
- Notable works: Urban Fortunes (1987)

John Richard Logan (born 1946) is a professor of sociology at Brown University, where he has taught since 2004. He is known for his research on housing discrimination and racial segregation in the United States.

Awards
Preceded by Charles Tilly	American Sociological Association; Distinguished Scholarly Book Award; 1990; With: Harvey Molotch	Succeeded by Andrew Abbott
