= Joseph Dumit =

American cultural anthropologist

Joseph Patrick Dumit (born September 3, 1966) is an American cultural anthropologist and science and technology studies scholar. He is a professor of anthropology and science & technology studies at the University of California, Davis, where he was formerly the director of the Institute for Social Sciences and Science and Technology Studies. He received his BA from Rice University and his PhD from the University of California, Santa Cruz. His 2004 book, Picturing Personhood: Brain Scans and Biomedical Identity, received the Diana Forsythe Prize from the American Anthropological Association in 2005 and the Rachel Carson Prize from the Society for Social Studies of Science in 2006.
