= Adia Benton =

American cultural and medical anthropologist

- Born: 1977 (age 48–49)
- Occupations: Anthropologist, Professor
- Awards: Rachel Carson Prize

Academic background
- Education: Brown University; Emory University; Harvard University

Academic work
- Discipline: Medical anthropology, science and technology studies
- Institutions: Northwestern University
- Notable works: HIV Exceptionalism: Development Through Disease in Sierra Leone

Adia Benton is an American cultural and medical anthropologist whose research concerns how care is provided in humanitarian emergencies and development projects. Benton is currently an associate professor of anthropology and African Studies at Northwestern University.

== Education and career ==
Adia Benton received a Bachelor of Arts in Human Biology from Brown University in 1999. She completed a Master of Public Health degree at Emory University in 2001. Benton did her doctoral work at Harvard University, completing an A.M. and Ph.D. in Social Anthropology in 2007 and 2009.

In 2014, while assistant professor of anthropology at Brown University, Benton was interviewed and contributed to several articles and discussions on the topic of Ebola.

== Selected publications ==
- Benton, Adia; Dionne, Kim Yi (March 16, 2015). "International Political Economy and the 2014 West African Ebola Outbreak". African Studies Review. 58 (1). Cambridge University Press (CUP): 223–236. doi:10.1017/asr.2015.11. ISSN 0002-0206. S2CID 145655484.
- Benton, Adia. HIV exceptionalism : development through disease in Sierra Leone. Minneapolis. ISBN 9781452943848. OCLC 903645936.
- Benton, Adia (2017). "Ebola at a Distance: A Pathographic Account of Anthropology's Relevance". Anthropological Quarterly. 90 (2): 495–524. doi:10.1353/anq.2017.0028. ISSN 1534-1518. S2CID 149189478.
- Benton, Adia (2020). "Mourning, Survival, and Time". In McGranahan, Carole (ed.). Writing anthropology : essays on craft and commitment. Durham: Duke University Press. pp. 140–142. doi:10.1215/9781478009160-026. ISBN 978-1-4780-0916-0. OCLC 1146544910. S2CID 241535734.

== Awards ==
In 2017, Benton won the Rachel Carson Prize for her book HIV Exceptionalism: Development Through Disease in Sierra Leone from the Society for Social Studies of Science.
