= Charis Thompson =

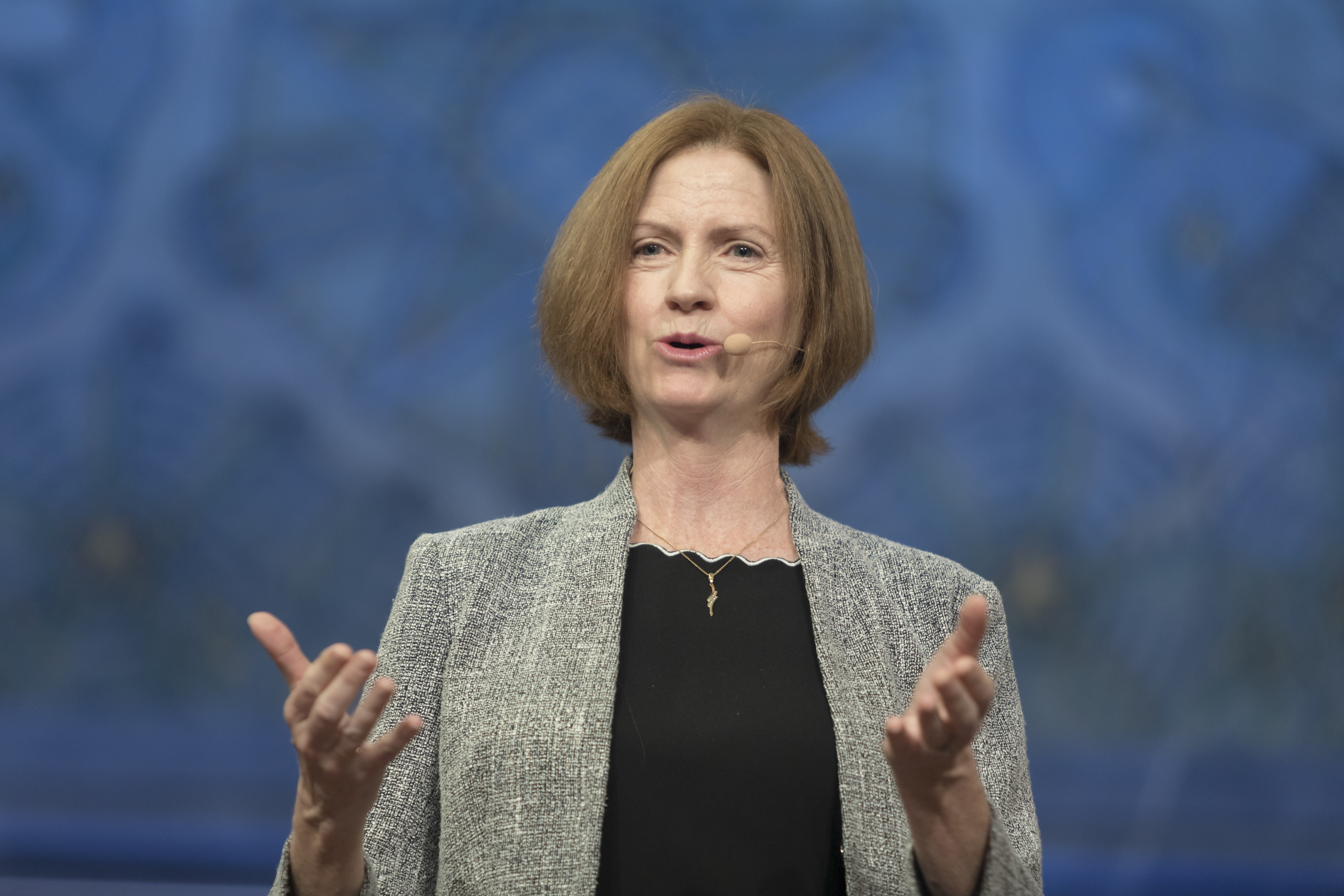
Photo of Charis Thompson in November 2017

Charis Thompson was Professor of Sociology at the London School of Economics, and before that a Professor at Harvard and Berkeley. She was a professor of Gender and Women's Studies in the Department of Gender and Women's Studies at the University of California at Berkeley. She was also associate director, and the founding Director, of the Science, Technology, and Society Center at UC Berkeley.

She is the author of Making Parents: The Ontological Choreography of Reproductive Technologies (MIT Press 2005) which won the 2007 Rachel Carson Prize from the Society for Social Studies of Science. From that book, she is known for the concept of "ontological choreography".

== Career ==
She has written on stem cell research, biodiversity conservation, and population. She is the author of Good Science: the Ethical Choreography of Stem Cell Research (MIT Press 2013).

Thompson has degrees from the Science Studies program University of California, San Diego (Ph.D.) and Oxford University (BA Hons).

She was a National Science Foundation postdoctoral fellow at Cornell University's Science, Technology, & Society Department, and Assistant Professor at the University of Illinois at Urbana-Champaign and Harvard University.

She has been a visitor at the Institute for Research on Women and Gender at the University of Michigan and at the Centre de Sociologie de l'Innovation, École Supérieure des Mines de Paris.

== Personal life ==
She is a recipient of the Distinguished Teaching Award from the UC Berkeley Social Science Division.

In 2017, she was awarded an honorary doctorate by the Norwegian University of Science and Technology (NTNU).
