= Charles Murray (political scientist) =

American political scientist (born 1943)

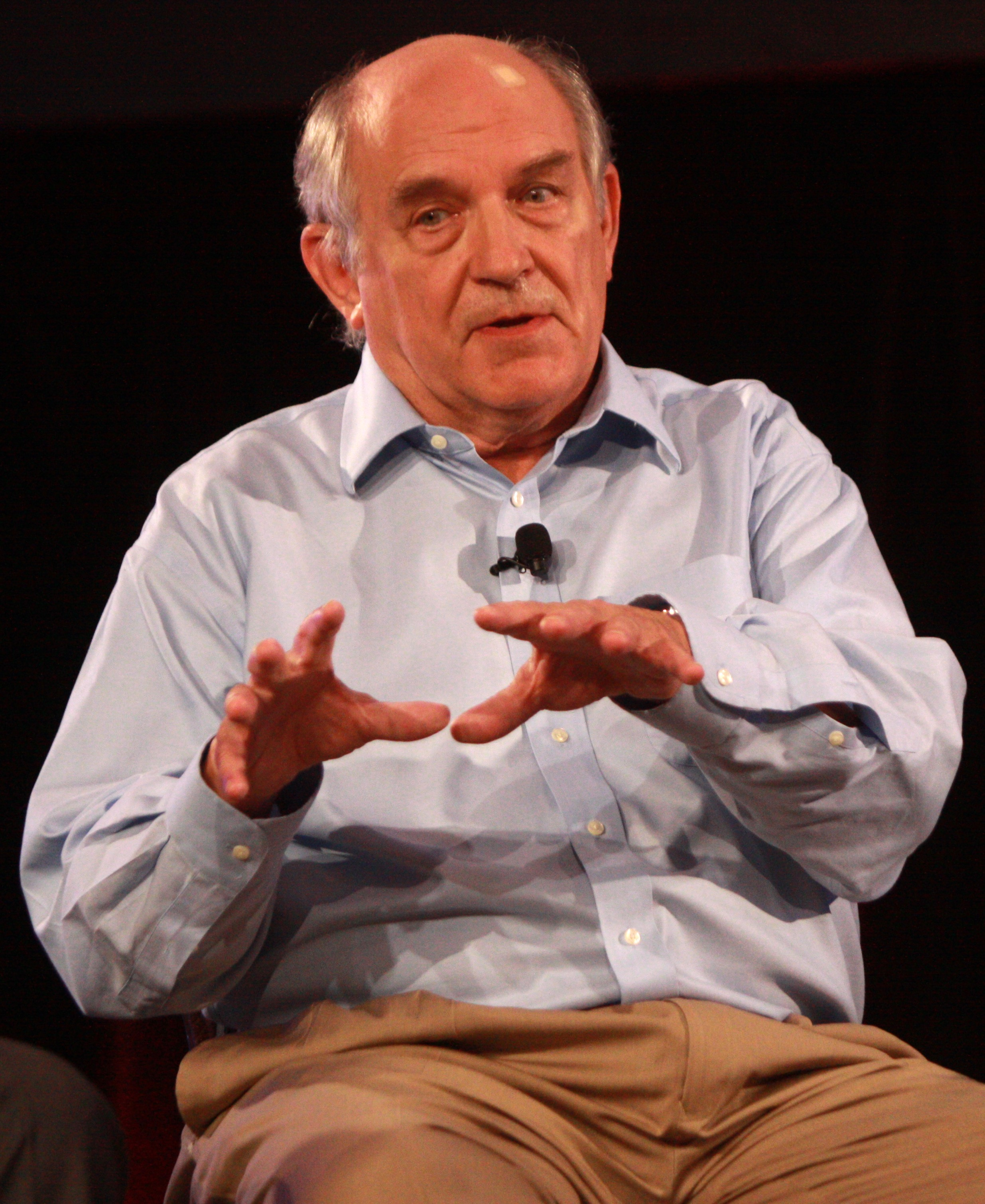
- Murray in 2013
- Born: Charles Alan Murray; January 8, 1943 (age 83); Newton, Iowa, U.S.
- Spouses: Suchart Dej-Udom (m. 1966; div. 1980) Catherine Bly Cox (m. 1983)
- Children: 4
- Awards: Irving Kristol Award (2009); Kistler Prize (2011)

Scholarly background
- Education: Harvard University (BA); Massachusetts Institute of Technology (MA, PhD)
- Thesis: Investment and Tithing in Thai Villages: A Behavioral Study of Rural Modernization (1974)
- Doctoral advisor: Lucian Pye

Scholarly work
- Discipline: Political science
- School or tradition: Right-libertarianism
- Institutions: American Institutes for Research; Manhattan Institute for Policy Research; American Enterprise Institute
- Main interests: Race and intelligence Social welfare policy
- Notable works: Losing Ground (1984); The Bell Curve (1994); Coming Apart (2012)

Charles Alan Murray (/ˈmɜːri/; born January 8, 1943) is an American political scientist. He is the W.H. Brady Scholar at the American Enterprise Institute, a conservative think tank in Washington, D.C.

Murray's work is highly controversial. His book Losing Ground: American Social Policy, 1950–1980 (1984) discussed the American welfare system. In the book The Bell Curve (1994), he and co-author Richard Herrnstein argue that in 20th-century American society, intelligence became a better predictor than parental socioeconomic status or education level of many individual outcomes, including income, job performance, pregnancy out of wedlock, and crime, and that social welfare programs and education efforts to improve social outcomes for the disadvantaged are largely counterproductive. The Bell Curve also argues that average intelligence quotient (IQ) differences between racial and ethnic groups are at least partly genetic in origin, a view that is now considered discredited by mainstream science.

== Early life and education ==
Of Scotch-Irish ancestry, Murray was born on January 8, 1943, in Newton, Iowa, and raised in a Republican, "Norman Rockwell kind of family" that stressed moral responsibility. He is the son of Frances B. (née Patrick) and Alan B. Murray, an executive for the Maytag Company. His youth was marked by a rebellious and pranksterish sensibility. As a teen, he played pool at a hangout for juvenile delinquents, developed debating skills, espoused labor unionism (to his parents' annoyance), and on one occasion helped burn a cross that he and his friends had erected near a police station. Murray grew up in a Presbyterian family, but by college had become an agnostic.

Murray credits the SAT with helping him get out of Newton and into Harvard. "Back in 1961, the test helped get me into Harvard from a small Iowa town by giving me a way to show that I could compete with applicants from Exeter and Andover," wrote Murray. "Ever since, I have seen the SAT as the friend of the little guy, just as James Bryant Conant, president of Harvard, said it would be when he urged the SAT upon the nation in the 1940s." However, in a 2012 op-ed published in The New York Times, Murray argued in favor of removing the SAT's role in college admissions, commenting that the SAT "has become a symbol of new-upper-class privilege, as people assume (albeit wrongly) that high scores are purchased through the resources of private schools and expensive test preparation programs".

Murray earned a BA in history from Harvard University in 1965 and a PhD in political science from the Massachusetts Institute of Technology (MIT) in 1974.

== Peace Corps ==
Murray left for the Peace Corps in Thailand in 1965, staying abroad for six years. At the beginning of this period, Murray kindled a romance with his Thai Buddhist language instructor (in Hawaii), Suchart Dej-Udom, the daughter of a wealthy Thai businessman, who was "born with one hand and a mind sharp enough to outscore the rest of the country on the college entrance exam". Murray subsequently proposed by mail from Thailand, and their marriage began the following year, a move that Murray now considers youthful rebellion. "I'm getting married to a one-handed Thai Buddhist," he said. "This was not the daughter-in-law that would have normally presented itself to an Iowa couple."

Murray credits his time in the Peace Corps in Thailand with his lifelong interest in Asia. "There are aspects of Asian culture as it is lived that I still prefer to Western culture, 30 years after I last lived in Thailand," says Murray. "Two of my children are half-Asian. Apart from those personal aspects, I have always thought that the Chinese and Japanese civilizations had elements that represented the apex of human accomplishment in certain domains."

His tenure with the Peace Corps ended in 1968, and during the remainder of his time in Thailand he worked on an American Institutes for Research (AIR) covert counter-insurgency program for the US military in cooperation with the CIA.

Recalling his time in Thailand in a 2014 episode of Conversations with Bill Kristol, Murray commented that his worldview was fundamentally shaped by his time there, "Essentially, most of what you read in my books I learned in Thai villages." He continued, "I suddenly was struck first by the enormous discrepancy between what Bangkok thought was important to the villagers and what the villagers wanted out of government. And the second thing I got out of it was that when the government change agent showed up, the village went to hell in terms of its internal governance."

Murray's work in the Peace Corps and subsequent social research in Thailand for research firms associated with the US government led to the subject of his doctoral thesis in political science at MIT, in which he argued against bureaucratic intervention in the lives of Thai villagers.

== Divorce and remarriage ==
By the 1980s, his marriage to Suchart Dej-Udom had been unhappy for years, but "his childhood lessons on the importance of responsibility brought him slowly to the idea that divorce was an honorable alternative, especially with young children involved."

Murray divorced Dej-Udom after fourteen years of marriage and three years later married Catherine Bly Cox (born 1949, Newton, Iowa), an English literature instructor at Rutgers University. Cox was initially dubious when she saw his conservative reading choices, and she spent long hours "trying to reconcile his shocking views with what she saw as his deep decency". In 1989, Murray and Cox co-authored a book on the Apollo program, Apollo: Race to the Moon. Murray attends and Cox is a member of a Quaker meeting in Virginia, and they live in Frederick County, Maryland near Washington, D.C.

Murray has four children, two by each wife. While his second wife, Catherine Bly Cox, had converted to Quakerism as of 2014, Murray still considered himself an agnostic. Murray described himself in 2021 as a "wannabe Christian" who takes faith seriously but had yet to acquire deep faith. As of 2025, Murray now considers himself a Christian, and wrote Taking Religion Seriously, exploring rational arguments for faith.

== Research ==
Murray continued research work at AIR, one of the largest of the private social science research organizations, upon his return to the US. From 1974 to 1981, Murray worked for the AIR eventually becoming chief political scientist. While at AIR, Murray supervised evaluations in the fields of urban education, welfare services, daycare, adolescent pregnancy, services for the elderly, and criminal justice.

From 1981 to 1990, he was a fellow with the conservative Manhattan Institute where he wrote Losing Ground, which heavily influenced the welfare reform debate in 1996, and In Pursuit. He has been a fellow of the conservative American Enterprise Institute since 1990 and was a frequent contributor to The Public Interest, a journal of conservative politics and culture. In March 2009, he received AEI's highest honor, the Irving Kristol Award. He has also received a doctorate honoris causa from Universidad Francisco Marroquín. Murray has received grants from the conservative Bradley Foundation to support his scholarship, including the writing of The Bell Curve.

=== Losing Ground ===
Murray argues in his book Losing Ground: American Social Policy, 1950–1980 (1984) that social welfare programs actually hurt society as a whole, as well as the very people those programs are trying to help, and concludes that these programs should therefore be eliminated. Murray proposes three "laws" of social programs to defend this policy prescription:

1. "Law of Imperfect Selection": Any objective rule that defines eligibility for a social transfer program will irrationally exclude some persons.
2. "Law of Unintended Rewards": Any social transfer increases the net value of being in the condition that prompted the transfer.
3. "Law of Net Harm": The less likely it is that the unwanted behavior will change voluntarily, the more likely it is that a program to induce change will cause net harm.

=== The Bell Curve ===
External videos
- Booknotes interview with Murray on The Bell Curve, December 4, 1994, C-SPAN

The Bell Curve: Intelligence and Class Structure in American Life (1994) is a controversial bestseller that Charles Murray wrote with Harvard professor Richard J. Herrnstein. The book's title comes from the bell-shaped normal distribution of IQ scores. Its central thesis is that in American society in the 20th century intelligence had become a better predictor of many factors including income, job performance, unwed pregnancy, and crime than one's parents' socio-economic status or education level. The book also argued that those with high intelligence (the "cognitive elite") were becoming separated from those with average and below-average intelligence, and that this constituted a dangerous social trend. He also warned of a merger of the "cognitive elite" with the "wealth elite", which would become increasingly isolated and could result in an authoritarian "custodial state". After its publication, academics criticized the book over his assertions on race and IQ. Some said it supported long-discredited "scientific racism" and a number of books were written to rebut The Bell Curve. Those works included a 1996 edition of evolutionary biologist Stephen Jay Gould's The Mismeasure of Man; a collection of essays, The Bell Curve Wars (1995), reacting to Murray and Herrnstein's commentary; and The Bell Curve Debate (1995), whose essays similarly respond to issues raised in The Bell Curve. Arthur S. Goldberger and Charles F. Manski critiqued the empirical methods supporting the book's hypotheses.

The book's most controversial argument hinged on a hypothesized relationship between race and intelligence, specifically the hypothesis that differences in average IQ test performance between racial groups are at least partially genetic in origin. Subsequent developments in genetics research have led to a scholarly consensus that this hypothesis is false. The idea that there are genetically determined differences in intelligence between racial groups is now considered discredited by mainstream science.

Much of the work referenced by The Bell Curve was funded by the Pioneer Fund, which aims to advance the scientific study of heredity and human differences, and which has been accused of promoting white supremacist views, particularly scientific racism. Murray criticized the characterization of the Pioneer Fund as a racist organization, arguing that it has as much relationship to its founder as "Henry Ford and today's Ford Foundation".

=== Coming Apart ===
In his bestseller Coming Apart: The State of White America, 1960–2010 (2012), Murray describes diverging trends between poor and upper middle-class white Americans in the half-century after the death of John F. Kennedy. He focuses on white Americans in order to argue that economic decline in that period was not experienced solely by minorities, whom he brings into his argument in the last few chapters of the book. He argues that class strain has cleaved white Americans into two distinct, highly segregated strata: "an upper class, defined by educational attainment, and a new lower class, characterized by the lack of it. Murray also posits that the new [white] 'lower class' is less industrious, less likely to marry and raise children in a two-parent household, and more politically and socially disengaged."

In his review in The New York Times, columnist David Brooks wrote, "I'll be shocked if there's another book that so compellingly describes the most important trends in American society."

Critics have suggested that he cherry-picked the data and time period under analysis, with Nell Irvin Painter, for example, writing that "behaviors that seem to have begun in the 1960s belong to a much longer and more complex history than ideologically driven writers like Mr. Murray would have us believe."

=== Op-ed writings ===
Murray has written opinion pieces for The New Republic, Commentary, The Public Interest, The New York Times, The Wall Street Journal, National Review, and The Washington Post. He has been a witness before United States House and Senate committees and a consultant to senior Republican government officials in the United States and other conservative officials in the United Kingdom, Eastern Europe, and the Organisation for Economic Co-operation and Development.

In the July/August 2007 issue of The American, a magazine published by the American Enterprise Institute, Murray says he has changed his mind about SAT tests and says they should be scrapped: "Perhaps the SAT had made an important independent contribution to predicting college performance in earlier years, but by the time research was conducted in the last half of the 1990s, the test had already been ruined by political correctness." Murray advocates replacing the traditional SAT with the College Board's subject achievement tests: "The surprising empirical reality is that the SAT is redundant if students are required to take achievement tests."

== Public speech and protest at Middlebury College ==
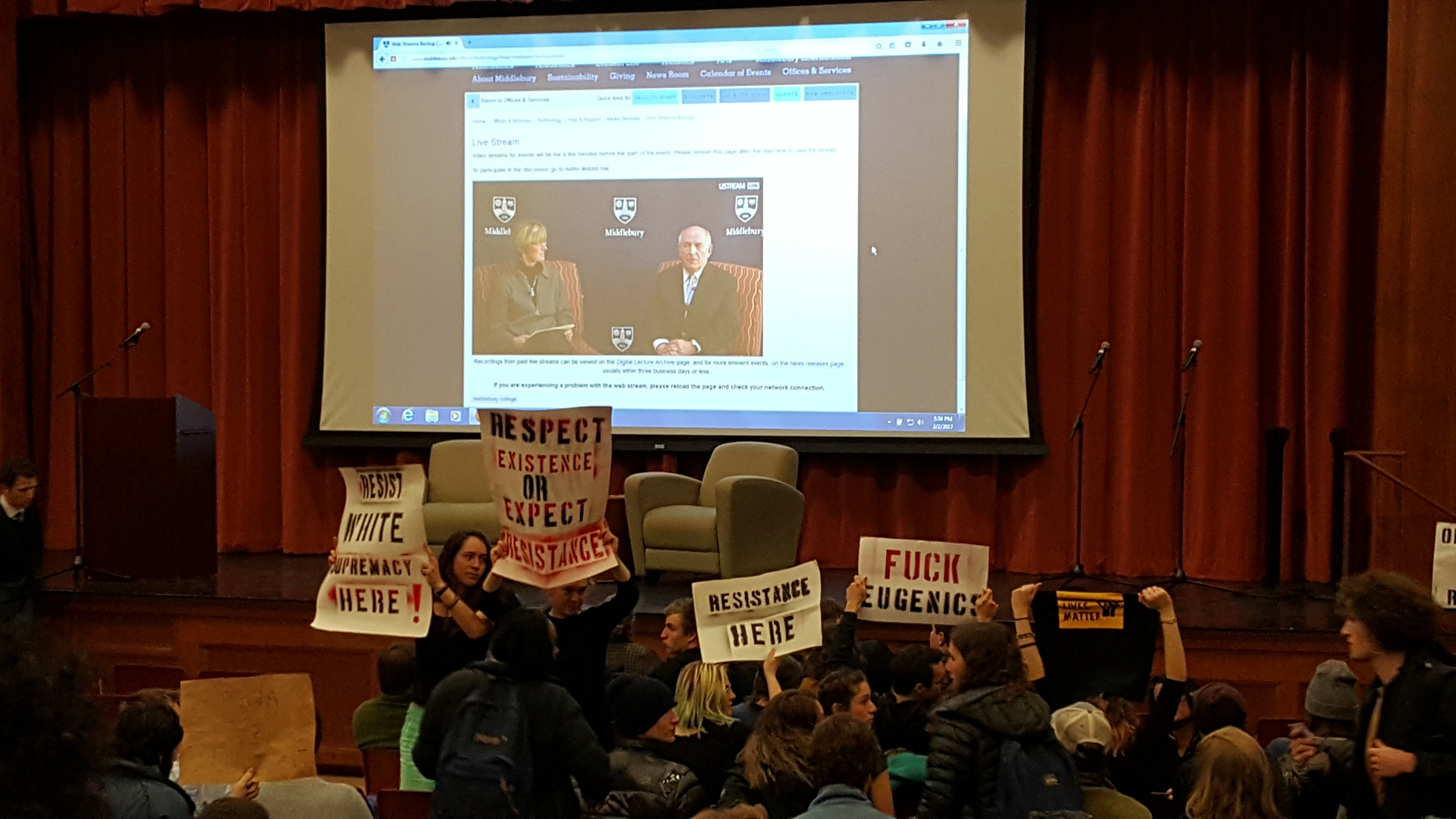
Murray speaks at Middlebury College as students protest.

On March 2, 2017, Murray was scheduled to speak at Middlebury College in Middlebury, Vermont, about Coming Apart: The State of White America, 1960-2010. Murray was invited to attend the college by Middlebury's American Enterprise Institute Club, who received co-sponsorship of the event from a professor in the political science department. Before Murray was able to speak, students within the hall rose to their feet and recited in unison a speech about the eugenicist implications of Murray's work. Students proceeded to chant and dance in the hall in an effort to stop Murray from speaking. Bill Burger, Middlebury College's Vice President of Communications, announced that the speech would be moved to another location. A closed circuit broadcast showed Murray being interviewed by political science professor Allison Stanger—chanting from protesters could be heard throughout the broadcast. After the interview, there was a violent confrontation between protesters—both from the college and the surrounding community—and Murray, Vice President for Communications Bill Burger, and Stanger (who was hospitalized with a neck injury and concussion) as they left the McCullough Student Center. Middlebury students said that Middlebury Public Safety officers instigated and escalated violence against nonviolent protesters and that administrator Bill Burger assaulted protesters with a car. Middlebury President Laurie L. Patton responded after the event, saying the school would respond to "the clear violations of Middlebury College policy that occurred inside and outside Wilson Hall". The school took disciplinary action against 74 students for their involvement in the incident.

== Political views ==
Murray identifies as a libertarian. He has also been described as conservative, and far-right.

Murray supported and voted for Donald Trump in the 2024 United States presidential election, arguing on X that his opponent Joe Biden was "overwhelmingly doctrinaire DEI" and "demonized whites."

=== Education ===
Murray has been critical of the No Child Left Behind law, arguing that it "set a goal that was devoid of any contact with reality.... The United States Congress, acting with large bipartisan majorities, at the urging of the President, enacted as the law of the land that all children are to be above average." He sees the law as an example of "Educational romanticism [which] asks too much from students at the bottom of the intellectual pile, asks the wrong things from those in the middle, and asks too little from those at the top."

Challenging "educational romanticism", he wrote Real Education: Four Simple Truths for Bringing America's Schools Back to Reality, making the argument for "four simple truths", namely: ability varies, half of all children are below average, too many people are going to college, and that America's future depends on how we educate the academically gifted.

In 2014, a speech that Murray was scheduled to give at Azusa Pacific University was "postponed" due to Murray's research on human group differences. Murray responded to the institution by claiming that it was a disservice to the students and faculty to dismiss his research because of its controversial nature rather than the evidence. Murray also urged the university to consider his works as they are and reach conclusions for themselves, rather than relying on sources that "specialize in libeling people".

=== Economics ===
Murray has indicated that he believes that the government is over regulated and has expressed support for disobeying regulations he considers to be unjust.

Murray supports having simpler tax codes and decreasing government benefits which could incentivize childbearing. In June 2016, Murray wrote that replacing welfare with a universal basic income (UBI) was the best way to adapt to "a radically changing U.S. jobs market" and defended that, as of 2014, the annual cost of a UBI in the US would have been about $200 billion cheaper than the current system.

=== Abortion ===
During an appearance at CPAC, Murray said of abortions: "It's a murder—it's a homicide—but sometimes homicide is justified". He has said that he believes that it is acceptable in certain situations including when a woman's life is at risk and when there is severe damage to the brain of the child. Murray has also indicated that he thinks that conservatives should put social issues like abortion on the back burner and has said they should seek a "moral suasion" rather than criminalization of issues like abortion and same-sex marriage.

=== Race ===
In the April 2007 issue of Commentary magazine, Murray wrote on the disproportionate representation of Jews in the ranks of outstanding achievers and says that one of the reasons is that they "have been found to have an unusually high mean intelligence as measured by IQ tests since the first Jewish samples were tested". His article concludes with an assertion: "At this point, I take sanctuary in my remaining hypothesis, uniquely parsimonious and happily irrefutable. The Jews are God's chosen people."

In Murray's The Bell Curve in chapters 13 and 14 the authors wrote about the enduring differences in race and intelligence and discuss implications of that difference. They write in the introduction to chapter 13 that "The debate about whether and how much genes and environment have to do with ethnic differences remains unresolved," and that "It seems highly likely to us that both genes and the environment have something to do with racial differences." This stands in contrast to the contemporary and subsequent consensus of mainstream researchers, who do not find that racial disparities in educational attainment or measured intelligence are explained by between-group genetic differences.

Citing assertions made by Murray in The Bell Curve, The Southern Poverty Law Center charged that his ideas were rooted in eugenics. Murray disputed this. Francis Wheen summarized Murray's arguments as "Black people are more stupid than white people: always have been, always will be. This is why they have less economic and social success. Since the fault lies in their genes, they are doomed to be at the bottom of the heap now and forever." Other intellectuals have defended Murray against allegations of racism, including Sam Harris, Glenn Loury, Andrew Sullivan, James Flynn, and Kyle Smith.

== Selected bibliography ==
- A Behavioral Study of Rural Modernization: Social and Economic Change in Thai Villages, Praeger Publishers, 1977.
- Beyond Probation: Juvenile Corrections and the Chronic Delinquent (with Louis A. Cox Jr.), Sage Publishing, 1979.
- Losing Ground: American Social Policy, 1950–1980, Basic Books, 1984, ISBN 0465042317. Analyzes welfare reform.
- In Pursuit: Of Happiness and Good Government, Simon & Schuster, 1989, ISBN 0671687433.
- Apollo: The Race to the Moon (with Catherine Bly Cox), Simon & Schuster, 1989, ISBN 978-0671706258.
- The Bell Curve: Intelligence and Class Structure in American Life (with Richard J. Herrnstein), Free Press, 1994, ISBN 0029146739.
- What It Means to Be a Libertarian, Broadway Books, 1997, ISBN 0553069284.
- "IQ and economic success", The Public Interest (1997): 128, 21–35.
- Income Inequality and IQ, AEI Press, 1998.
- The Underclass Revisited, AEI Press, 1999. PDF copy
- Human Accomplishment: The Pursuit of Excellence in the Arts and Sciences, 800 B.C. to 1950, HarperCollins, 2003, ISBN 006019247X. A quantification and ranking of well-known scientists and artists.
- In Our Hands: A Plan To Replace The Welfare State, AEI Press, March 2006, ISBN 0844742236.
- Real Education: Four Simple Truths for Bringing American Schools Back to Reality, Crown Forum, August 2008, ISBN 978-0307405388.
- Coming Apart: The State of White America, 1960–2010, Crown Forum, 2012, ISBN 0307453421.
- The Curmudgeon's Guide to Getting Ahead: Dos and Don'ts of Right Behavior, Tough Thinking, Clear Writing, and Living a Good Life, Crown Business, 2014, ISBN 978-0804141444.
- By the People: Rebuilding Liberty Without Permission, Crown Forum, 2015, ISBN 978-0385346511.
- Human Diversity: The Biology of Gender, Race, and Class, Twelve, 2020, ISBN 978-1538744017
- Facing Reality: Two Truths About Race in America, Encounter Books, 2021, ISBN 978-1641771979
- Taking Religion Seriously, Encounter Books, 2025, ISBN 978-1641774857

In addition to these books, Murray has published articles in Commentary magazine, The New Criterion, The Weekly Standard, The Washington Post, The Wall Street Journal, and The New York Times.

== See also ==
- Historiometry
