= Human Accomplishment =

2003 book by Charles Murray

Human Accomplishment : The Pursuit of Excellence in the Arts and Sciences, 800 B.C. to 1950
- Author: Charles Murray
- Cover artist: Robert Bull Design
- Language: English
- Subjects: Art, science
- Publisher: HarperCollins
- Publication date: 9 October 2003
- Publication place: United States
- Media type: Print (Hardcover and Paperback)
- Pages: 668
- ISBN: 978-0060192471
- OCLC: 52047270

Human Accomplishment: The Pursuit of Excellence in the Arts and Sciences, 800 B.C. to 1950 is a 2003 book by the political scientist Charles Murray. Surveying outstanding contributions to the arts and sciences from ancient times to the mid-twentieth century, Murray attempts to quantify and explain human accomplishment worldwide in the fields of arts and sciences by calculating the amount of space allocated to them in reference works, an area of research sometimes referred to as historiometry.

== Index scores ==
Murray ranks the leading 4,000 innovators in several fields of human accomplishment from 800 BC to 1950. In each field Murray identifies a number of sources (leading encyclopedias, histories and surveys) providing information about the leading figures in the field. The rankings are made from information in these sources. A raw score is determined based on how many sources mention and on how much space in each source is devoted to a person. Then these raw scores are normalized so that the lowest score is 1 and the highest score is 100. The resulting scores are called "Index Scores".

== Analysis ==
According to Murray's analysis, accomplishment has not been uniformly distributed. For example, in Italian Renaissance, accomplishment was concentrated in Florence and Venice. In the British Isles, around London, the industrial north, and lowland Scotland. Another result of his analysis was that most innovation has been accomplished by men, not women, and Europeans, not other ethnic and cultural groups.

There is a relationship between closeness to elite universities and human accomplishment (but not between non-elite universities and accomplishment). Furthermore, innovation is self-reinforcing: where there has been innovation, likely more will occur.

The book argued that streams of accomplishment are fostered by political regimes that give de facto freedom of action to their potential artists and scholars. This means freedom of expression and innovation. It does not necessarily mean democracy although totalitarianism suppressed innovation. War and civil unrest did not affect innovation.

Religious liberty increased innovation. Jews had "sparse representation in European arts and sciences through the beginning of the 19th century", but within a century Jews were disproportionately represented (except in astronomy). This coincided with the emancipation of Jews who earlier had been denied legal rights and access to universities and public office.

The highest scoring woman in a category was Murasaki Shikibu among Japanese literature. The highest in western literature was Virginia Woolf. The highest in science was Marie Curie.

== Decline ==
In Human Accomplishment, Murray concludes that Western civilization is in decline based in part on his qualitative judgement that there has been less creative activity in the Western world during the late twentieth century.

He argued that the world's per capita progress in the Sciences and especially the Arts have declined, usually starting sometimes in the nineteenth century. In part this is due to diminishing returns. In the final chapters he abandons empirical analysis, writing "I cannot supply Quantitative measures", and the analysis is "less Quantitative, more speculative, and definitely more opinionated." He argued, based on Aristotle in the Nicomachean Ethics, that innovation is increased by beliefs that life has a purpose and that the function of life is to fulfill that purpose; by beliefs about transcendental goods and a sense of goodness, truth and beauty; and by beliefs that individuals can act efficaciously as individuals, and a culture that enables them to do so. Murray argued that there is an absence of this in the current secularist and nihilist society which has caused the decline.

== Reviews ==
The American Library Association: Murray says, "Achievements that require mental and spiritual effort are the highest forms of human endeavor". He has scanned the most reputable biographical dictionaries and histories of the Arts, Philosophy, and Sciences to find who and what, during 800 B.C.–1950, are mentioned in them. He came up with 4,139 people and a list of events and ponders 20 persons in each of nine scientific, three philosophic, and nine artistic fields who were most extensively covered in the resources. More than 80 percent are "dead white males," and Murray carefully examines why. The greatest achievements of India, China, Japan, and Islam occurred well before the West took off during the Renaissance, and each of those cultures valued duty, family, and consensus, whereas the West prefers individualism, the sine qua non of scientific debate and discovery. Further, the scientific method was a set of Western "meta-inventions" (Murray's term) that arose, fortunately, simultaneously with the ratification of Thomism, with its dual emphasis on Faith and Reason, by the most important Cultural force in the West, the Roman Catholic Church of overarching importance to great achievements in any culture. Murray argues that life has purpose and belief in ideals of beauty, truth, and goodness.

An academic review by two authors from two different fields criticized Murray's reliance on easily available English-language sources and questioned whether he was being frank when he attributed his results to environmental differences rather than genetic differences:

Galton and Murray share the belief that Western civilization can boast human achievements measurably superior to any other civilization. Whether this inference seems reasonable rests on whether his methods can circumvent the potential ethnocentric biases in his archival sources. A striking personal experience leads me to be skeptical. For one investigation, I collected an apparently huge database of over 10,000 notables of Chinese civilization (Simonton, 1988). Later, I had a graduate student who, unlike me, had access to reference works written in Chinese. Focusing solely on literary creators, he obtained a sample size almost three times the number I had obtained from European-language sources. Such disparities in coverage make cross-civilization comparisons extremely precarious.

A review in the journal Evolutionary Psychology suggested that "The reason (Human Accomplishment) is such a roaring success is that it does not, in the end, intend to illuminate, enlarge, edify or inform, but, rather, to demonstrate and establish the intrinsic pre-eminence of a small group of elites, to differentiate human accomplishment on the grounds of racial and intellectual superiority—which it in no short measure succeeds in doing." The reviewer compared Aristotle's argument that some people are natural slaves, whose work allowed "the Patrician class its leisure and learning."
