= Lauren B. Edelman =

American sociologist (1955-2023)

President of the Law and Society Association
- In office 2002–2003

Personal details
- Born: May 11, 1955 Urbana, Illinois, U.S.
- Died: February 7, 2023 (aged 67)
- Occupation: Sociologist
- Awards: Guggenheim Fellowship (2000); American Sociological Association Distinguished Scholarly Book Award (2018); Fellow of the American Academy of Arts and Sciences (2022)

Academic background
- Education: University of Wisconsin–Madison (BA); Stanford University (MA and PhD); UC Berkeley School of Law (JD)
- Thesis: Organizational governance and due process: the expansion of rights in the American workplace (1986)
- Doctoral advisor: John W. Meyer; William Richard Scott

Academic work
- Sub-discipline: Sociology of law
- Institutions: University of Wisconsin–Madison; UC Berkeley School of Law

Lauren Beatrice Edelman (May 11, 1955 – February 7, 2023) was an American sociologist. She was a professor at University of Wisconsin–Madison and the UC Berkeley School of Law, becoming the Agnes Roddy Robb Professor of Law and Sociology at the latter. A sociologist of law and organizations, she won the 2018 American Sociological Association Distinguished Scholarly Book Award for her 2016 Working Law: Courts, Corporations and Symbolic Civil Rights. She was a 2000 Guggenheim Fellow and 2022 Fellow of the American Academy of Arts and Sciences, and was president of the Law and Society Association from 2002 to 2003.

== Biography ==
Lauren Beatrice Edelman was born on May 11, 1955, in Urbana, Illinois. She was the daughter of ceramic artist Bacia (née Stepner) and political scientist Murray Edelman, and was raised in Madison, Wisconsin, as well as in Italy. As a youth, she was first-chair violin for the State of Wisconsin Youth Symphony Orchestra.

Originally majoring in music at the University of Wisconsin–Madison, Edelman later changed her major to sociology, before obtaining a BA from that institution in 1977. She did her graduate studies at Stanford University, getting a MA in 1980 and PhD in 1986. Her doctoral dissertation, Organizational governance and due process: the expansion of rights in the American workplace, was supervised by John W. Meyer and William Richard Scott. She also obtained a JD from UC Berkeley School of Law in 1986. Christopher Hamerton cited the work of her Berkeley Law mentor Philip Selznick, particularly his work in the sociology of law and organizational structures, as an influence.

In 1986, Edelman returned to her baccalaureate alma mater as a professor in their sociology department, starting off as assistant professor before being promoted to associate professor in 1992. In 1996, she returned to Berkeley Law as the Agnes Roddy Robb Professor of Law and Sociology. She was also the Director of the Center for the Study of Law and Society (2004-2009) and the Chair and Associate Dean for Jurisprudence and Social Policy (2010-2013). She was president of the Law and Society Association from 2002 to 2003, as well as chair of the American Sociological Association's Sociology of Law Section from 1996 to 1997.

Edelman researched the relationship between organizations and law. She co-wrote an American Journal of Sociology article, "When Organizations Rule: Judicial Deference to Institutionalized Employment Structures", which won the 2012 Law and Society Association Article Prize. Her book, Working Law: Courts, Corporations and Symbolic Civil Rights, was released by University of Chicago Press in November 2016. It won several awards: the ASA Sociology of Law Section's 2017 Distinguished Book Award, the 2017 Academy of Management George R. Terry Book Award, and the 2018 ASA Distinguished Scholarly Book Award.

In 2000, Edelman was elected a Guggenheim Fellow "for a study of the formation of civil rights law in the workplace". She also held fellowships at the Center for Advanced Study in the Behavioral Sciences at Stanford University and the Rockefeller Center at Villa Serbelloni. She also won the 2018 Harry J. Kalven, Jr. Prize, as well as the 2017 Stan Wheeler Mentorship award. She was elected Fellow of the American Academy of Arts and Sciences in 2022, and was an elected member of the Sociological Research Association.

Edelman was a friend of Purdue University Distinguished Professor Robin Stryker. She also had a dog named Juno.

Edelman died on February 7, 2023, following brief period of illness. Law & Society Review dedicated the third issue of volume 57 to Edelman, remarking: "Stated another way, Laurie was law and society". The issue elaborated further that her work "bridged the sociology of law and the sociology of organizations" and described her as "a pioneer in studying the application of anti-discrimination laws to different organizations and developing and elaborating new institutional organizational theory".

== Works ==
- Working Law: Courts, Corporations, and Symbolic Civil Rights (2016) (Note: Reviews of this book:)
