= Richard Lachmann =

American sociologist (1956–2021)

- Born: May 17, 1956; New York City, US
- Died: September 19, 2021 (aged 65); New York City, US
- Awards: ASA Distinguished Scholarly Book Award

Academic background
- Education: Princeton University; Harvard University

Academic work
- Main interests: Elite conflict theory Cultural Sociology Economic Sociology Political Sociology Social Networks Development/World Systems
- Notable works: Capitalists in Spite of Themselves (2000) "States and Power" (2010)

Richard Lachmann (May 17, 1956 – September 19, 2021) was an American sociologist and specialist in comparative historical sociology who was a professor at the University at Albany, SUNY.

Lachmann is best known as the author of the book "Capitalists in Spite of Themselves", which was awarded several prizes, including the American Sociological Association Distinguished Scholarly Book Award. In this work, Lachmann shows that relations among elites rather than class struggle, or any other set of factors proposed by other historians, primarily determined the creation or non-creation of capitalism in early modern Europe. Later, he used his elite conflict theory to analyze the political crisis in the United States. He died after a heart attack in 2021 at the age of 65.

== Early life and education ==
Lachmann was born in New York to Jewish parents who had escaped from Nazi Germany. "Each of them had a parent who was killed by the Nazis so I grew up with an understanding of Nazism and an appreciation of US liberal democracy," he recalled many years later. Richard's father, Karl Eduard Lachmann, worked for the United Nations; his mother, Lotte Becker Lachmann, taught French at a community college. Richard had a younger brother and sister.

Lachmann graduated from the United Nations International School, becoming one among the first cohorts to receive an International Baccalaureate. He attended Princeton as an undergraduate and Harvard for his PhD, studying historical sociology at both universities. He met his partner, Arlyn Miller, at Princeton. They had two children together.

== Career ==
From 1983 to 1990, Lachmann served as assistant professor of sociology at the University of Wisconsin in Madison. From 1990, he was a professor of sociology at the University at Albany, SUNY.

== Scientific contributions ==
=== The formation of scientific views ===
Lachmann's interest in sociology was sparked by political events of the 1970s: the war in Vietnam, the military coup in Chile, apartheid in South Africa, the Indonesian occupation of East Timor - these and other significant events and phenomena in the life of the world led Lachmann as a high school student and undergraduate to look for the root causes. In 2007, Lachmann remembered asking himself:

"Why did soldiers line up to die in imperialist wars? Why did workers put up with bad wages and alienating and dangerous labor? Even then, well before the piggishness of the Reagan and Clinton eras and still far from the unrestrained and boastful viciousness of the current George W. Bush administration, I was stunned at what I read in the New York Times (and even more so when I saw the fuller reality presented in small leftist outlets). On many days I would walk outside after reading about the latest outrages and wonder more than half seriously: Where are the guillotines?"

Lachmann recalled that after reading Marx's "Das Kapital" he had the feeling that in this work were the answers to his questions, in the form of historical analysis. The young scientist was highly influenced by modernization theory, which then was the dominant approach in Princeton University's sociology department. By his own admission, it took him a few years to realize that modernization is not the same as capitalism. At Harvard, which gave graduate students almost total freedom to design and pursue their own research projects, Lachmann could focus on the question that interested him most: the genesis of capitalism. He believed that only if we understand the origins of this social formation, can we fully understand the current trends of its development. Having familiarized himself with the works of the major historians and sociologists who had studied the subject of the genesis of capitalism, Lachmann came to the conclusion that none of their works offered a convincing explanation for the differences in capitalist development across nations. As he developed his own theory, Lachmann realized that "Marx and later Marxists asked the right questions but that the answers required a heavy dose of Weberian and elitist analysis".

=== The conflict of elites and the genesis of capitalism in England ===
In his first monograph, "From manor to the market" (1987), Lachmann put forward the idea that the genesis of capitalism in England was not due to class conflict (as the Marxists supposed), or the expansion of foreign trade (as the Weberians and some Marxists believed), but instead was the result of a chain of contingent elite conflicts, an outcome which could not be foreseen by anyone. Lachmann analyzed the interactions of conflict at the national level (between the Crown, the Church and the magnates), and at the local level (between commercial farmers, landowners and tenants). During the Reformation, Henry VIII dealt a crushing blow to the church, secularized monastic lands and confiscated church property. Trying not to let the land, alienated from the Church, fall into the hands of magnates, the Crown limited their local power. This strengthened the gentry, who privatized common lands and extinguished tenant rights in order to block crown efforts to reclaim agrarian lands, power and income. The inadvertent results of these political maneuvers were the formation of a large landless class and an agrarian revolution that provided the resources for industrial capitalism.

The book was highly appreciated by both sociologists and historians. Peter Bearman praised the originality of ideas and its logical, well-structured presentation. Retha Warnicke commended the work with the words: "his provocative and clearly stated analysis responds to questions left unanswered by the other theories". The most critical was a well-known British historian, an expert on agrarian history of England, Joan Thirsk, whom Lachmann had critiqued in the book for neglecting to take the high inflation of that era into her analysis. Thirsk chided the author for relying on secondary sources and a stubborn desire to subordinate historical facts to sociological concepts.

=== Elite conflict in medieval Europe ===
In his next book, "Capitalists in Spite of Themselves: Elite Conflict and Economic Transitions in Early Modern Europe" (2000), Lachmann consistently applies his theoretical model to cases beyond that of England: France, Spain, the Netherlands, and Renaissance Florence. According to Lachmann, all social development theories cannot fully explain the social changes in the period under review, above all because the factors they emphasize cannot account for why this process has successfully taken place in one country or region, and was stymied in others. So, Lachmann criticized Robert Brenner, who saw Britain as a Goldilocks case, where peasants were strong enough to liberate themselves from serfdom but not strong enough to appropriate all of the growing agricultural surplus. Lachmann shows that Brenner never identifies a mechanism that results in capitalism as opposed to some other post-feudal social system. Fernand Braudel and Immanuel Wallerstein, the authors of the world-system analysis, in turn, do not explain why the Italian city-states, which dominated European trade, did not realize the full potential of capitalist development, and instead stagnated and then lost economic leadership to the Netherlands and Britain.

Lachmann consistently traces elite and class conflicts to explain the outcomes in each of his cases. He shows how the fights against the French and Burgundian kings, the German emperors and the Roman Papacy combined with geopolitical stalemate to provide the conditions for the autonomy of the Italian cities in the Renaissance, and then at the local level how conflict elites launched the development of urban trade and efficient business techniques by defining the institutional specificity of mature institutions and the limits of urban capitalism. Critically important here is the case of Florence: cut off from the super-profits of transnational trafficking, the Florentine elite were forced to focus on the production of wool and silk, as well as on the financial support of the Pope. Florence was marked by centuries of elite and factional conflict that periodically led elites to "lower" themselves and ally with hierarchically subordinate groups. As a result, power passed from the aristocracy to the patricians, and then to the new elites, each of which, seeking hegemony, tried to block the next phase of the conflict. The desire of the elite to consolidate its hegemony stabilized social structure and become an obstacle on the path of capitalist development. Similarly, elite conflict resulted in a rapid stasis in Habsburg Spain, which prevented kings or metropolitan elites from exerting decisive control over their empire and the revenues it produced, thereby blocking every possibility of capitalist development. Dutch elites quickly grabbed trade routes and colonies but their settlement through Contracts of Correspondence immobilized resources and power, preventing the reallocation of military force needed to defend their commercial hegemony from Britain. Wealth and entrepreneurship were diverted into finance, and elites focused on controlling state offices that became the main source of wealth and the site from which they could manipulate the prices of government bonds.

Analyzing the transformation of the British and French elites, Lachmann considers the Reformation as a moment of "strategic breakthrough" in European history, but, unlike Weber, sees this process not so much as an ideological, but rather a structural, transformation. At the end of these processes of elite conflict, two sorts of absolutist states emerged: "horizontal", in England; and "vertical", in France. French monarchs were unable to overcome the clergy and magnates at the national level and were forced to create an apparatus of multiple 'state' offices in an effort to manipulate competing elites in their struggle for lucrative positions. This generated a power structure different from that in England, where the crown achieved dominance at the national level at the cost of severing links downward to local offices. Two horizontal elites, the crown and the gentry, each controlled a level of social structure, but the crown was unable to reach down to the local level to exert power or extract resources, leading to its defeat in the Civil War. The gentry took advantage of the crown's weakness, and, as Lachmann showed in From manor to market, established capitalist relations in the countryside.

British historian Rosemary Hopcroft and American sociologist Jack Goldstone have criticized this book. Hopcroft noted two important points: 1) it was absolutely unclear for her why the gentry, occupying a dominant position in the society, did not become rentiers, but instead continued to participate actively in the production of surplus product; 2) secondly, according to Hopcroft, capitalism had the strongest positions in those places where there had always been few communal rights to land and control of the elites had been extremely weak.

Jack Goldstone, a leading representative of the California School, stated that, until the mid-19th century, there was no difference in the agricultural development of Europe and China, and therefore considered almost all of Lachmann's arguments inconclusive, including his analysis of the difference between horizontal and vertical absolutism. Goldstone rejected Lachmann's claim that elite conflict was the driving force of social change and instead suggested that European development took off only after an "ideological and epistemological break", more related to the fields of science and philosophy than to the economy or elite and class relations.

=== Elites and hegemonic decline in the contemporary United States ===
Lachmann applied his elite conflict theory to the contemporary United States.

Lachmann found that, starting in the 1980s, national and state-level elites combined through mergers and changes in governmental regulations. This unity allowed elites to block state reforms and to appropriate ever more resources from the American masses while starving the state of revenues. In crucial ways, this elite autarky has paralleled the elite structures of Spain, France and the Netherlands when they failed to achieve, or lost, hegemony. He argued that, even if a new hegemon doesn't emerge, the U.S. will not be able to mobilize the resources and channel state power to ensure that it can govern the world geopolitically or manage the global economy. The U.S.-created financial bubble that led to the 2008 crash is likely to be repeated in different forms, further undermining America's ability to finance hegemonic projects or to win the consent of other nations to its policies.

=== Synthesizing works ===
In the period from 2010 to 2013 Lachmann released two books, which synthesize the state of their relevant fields. In "States and Power," he provides an overview of the existing scientific theories on the origins of states, the varying capacities of states to effect economic development, to exert geopolitical power, to offer social welfare benefits, and to shape national cultures, and on the role of ordinary citizens to influence state policies.

In his book, "What is Historical Sociology?" Lachmann reviews and critiques historical studies of the origins of capitalism, revolutions and social movements, states, empires, inequality, and gender. He discusses how the strengths and weaknesses of work in those areas suggest ways in which historical sociology can be developed most fruitfully. Lachmann researched media coverage of war deaths in the United States and Israel from the 1960s to the present.

== Major works ==
=== Books ===
- From Manor to Market: Structural Change in England, 1536–1640. University of Wisconsin Press, 1987.
- Capitalists in Spite of Themselves: Elite Conflict and Economic Transitions in Early Modern Europe. Oxford University Press, 2000.
- States and Power. Polity Press, 2010
- What Is Historical Sociology? Polity Press, 2013.
- First-Class Passengers on a Sinking Ship: Elite Politics and the Decline of Great Powers. Verso Books, 2020.

=== Articles ===
- Lachmann, Richard. Feudal Elite Conflict and the Origins of English Capitalism // Politics and Society. — 1985. — Vol. 14, no. 3. — pp. 349–378.
- "Absolutism's Antinomies: Class Formation, State Fiscal Structures and the Origins of the French Revolution (with Julia Adams) in Political Power and Social Theory, volume 7 (1988) pp. 135–75.
- Lachmann, Richard. Graffiti as Career and Ideology // American Journal of Sociology. — 1988. — Vol. 94, no. 2. — pp. 229—250.
- Lachmann, Richard. The Origins of Capitalism and the State in Western Europe // Annual Review of Sociology. — 1989. — Vol. 15. — pp. 47—72.
- "Elite Conflict and State Formation in Sixteenth and Seventeenth Century England and France" in American Sociological Review, volume 54, No.2, April, 1989, pp. 141–162.
- "Class Formation without Class Struggle: An Elite Theory of the Transition to Capitalism" in American Sociological Review, volume 55, No.3, June, 1990, pp. 398–414.
- "Making History From Above and Below: Elite and Popular Perspectives on Politics" (with Nelson Pichardo) in Social Science History 18:4 (winter 1994), pp. 497–504. Introduction to a special section on this topic which the authors edited and which appeared in the winter 1994 and spring 1995 issues of the journal.
- Lachmann, Richard. Comparisons Within a Single Social Formation: A Critical Appreciation of Perry Anderson's Lineages of the Absolutist State // Qualitative Sociology. — 2002. — Vol. 25, no. 1. — pp. 83–92. — DOI:10.1023/A:1014308324923.
- "Elite Self-Interest and Economic Decline in Early Modern Europe" in American Sociological Review, volume 68, No.3, June 2003, pp. 346–372.
- "Greed and Contingency: State Fiscal Crises and Imperial Failure in Early Modern Europe" in American Journal of Sociology, volume 115, No.1, July 2009, pp. 39–73. [Chinese translation in Fudan Political Science Review, vol. 7, 2009, pp. 105–33.]
- "Nationalism in a Post-Hegemonic World" in Review XXXIV, 3, 2011, pp. 259–83.
- "The Roots of American Decline" in Contexts, volume 10, No.1, winter 2011, pp. 44–49.
- "Between a Rock and a Hard Place" in Contexts, volume 11, No.3, summer 2012, pp. 20–21.
- "Toward a Sociology of Wealth: Definitions and Historical Comparisons" in Sociologia: Revista da Faculdade de Letras da Universidade do Porto (Portugal), volume 26 (2013), pp. 11–36.
- "Hegemons, Empires, and their Elites" in Sociologia, Problemas e Práticas (Portugal), no. 75, 2014, pp. 9–38.
- "Museums in the New Gilded Age: Collector Exhibits in New York Art Museums, 1945–2010." (with Emily Pain and Anibal Gauna), in Poetics 43 (2014) 60–69.
- "From Consensus to Paralysis in the United States, 1960–2012" in Political Power and Social Theory 26 (2014), pp. 195–233.
- "The Changing Face of War in Textbooks: Depictions of World War II and Vietnam, 1970–2009" (with Lacy Mitchell), in Sociology of Education Vol. 87, No.3 (2014), pp. 188–203.
- "States, Citizen Rights and Global Warming" Revue Internationale de Philosophie, vol. 70, No.275 (March 2016).
- "Neoliberalism, the Origins of the Global Crisis, and the Future of States" Sociology of Development Handbook, edited by Gregory Hooks (University of California Press).
- "Why We Fell: Declinist Writing and Theories of Imperial Failure in the Longue Durée" (with Fiona Rose-Greenland) in Poetics.
- "Neoliberalism, the Origins of the Global Crisis, and the Future of States" pp. 463–84 in The Sociology of Development Handbook, edited by Gregory Hooks (University of California Press, 2016).
- "The Culture of Sacrifice in Conscript and Volunteer Militaries: The U.S. Medal of Honor from the Civil War to Iraq, 1861–2014" (with Abby Stivers) in American Journal of Cultural Sociology, Vol. 4, No.3 (October 2016), pp. 323–58.
- "The Comparative Study of Empires" Sage Handbook of Political Sociology, edited by Stephen Turner and William Outhwaite.

== Awards and honors ==
- 2001 Distinguished Publication Award from the Political Sociology Section of the American Sociological Association
- 2002 Barrington Moore Best Book Award Honorable Mention from the Comparative Historical Sociology Section of the American Sociological Association (for "Capitalists in Spite of Themselves")
- 2003 Distinguished Scholarly Publication Award of the American Sociological Association (for "Capitalists in Spite of Themselves")
