= Year On =

Alternative education organization

- Website type: Education
- Available in: English
- Website: Archived website at the Wayback Machine (archived July 22, 2018)
- Commercial: Yes
- Current status: Out of business

UnCollege
- Website type: Education
- Available in: English
- Owner: Dale J. Stephens
- Website: www.uncollege.org
- Commercial: Yes

Year On, formerly UnCollege, was an organization which aims to equip students with the tools for self-directed learning and career building. Its flagship program was a yearlong gap year program involving training in work skills and life skills, volunteer service in a foreign country, and internship or personal project.

== Background ==
UnCollege was founded by Dale J. Stephens in 2011. Stephens is a self-described "elementary school dropout", as he was homeschooled with emphasis on real-world experience for the majority of his childhood. He briefly attended Hendrix College. While there, Stephens had a night-long discussion with a friend regarding the disconnect between the theoretical subject matter taught in college and its real world applications. This discussion would become the basis for UnCollege, which Stephens founded in 2011 in San Francisco.

In 2010, Stephens also applied for the Thiel Fellowship, a program founded by Peter Thiel which grants fellows US$100,000 to forgo college for two years and focus on their passions. After his initial proposal was rejected, Stephens was encouraged to reapply in pursuit of his work as an educational futurist through UnCollege. His second application succeeded and he was in the first batch of Thiel Fellows.

The UnCollege website featured resources, forums, and workshops designed to help students, both in and out of college, with the task of self-directed learning. The site also hosted The UnCollege Manifesto, a 25-page document written by Stephens that covers subjects like "The value (or lack thereof) of a college degree" and "Twelve steps to self-directed learning." Stephens expanded upon the approach described therein in a book, Hacking Your Education: Ditch the Lectures, Save Tens of Thousands, and Learn More Than Your Peers Ever Will, which was published in 2013.

In 2013, UnCollege began offering its flagship year-long program. The first iteration of the year-long program included four phases: Launch, in which students learnt life skills, work skills, and how to engage in self-directed learning; Voyage, in which students traveled to a foreign country, for a service learning trip; Internship, in which the students, using work skills acquired at Launch, seek out and work through an internship of their choosing; and Project, in which students completed, from start to finish, a capstone project of their choosing. The inaugural class of students in the year-long program included ten students from four countries. Later iterations of the yearlong program reversed the order of Launch and Voyage, eliminated the Project, and/or allowed students to choose between an Internship and a Project.

Initially, the year-long program was presented as an alternative to university. Students were encouraged to take a pathway, similar to Stephens' own, that avoided university studies. However, Stephens found that this pathway was neither practical nor desirable for most of his students. Subsequently, the year-long program was rebranded as a gap year program, designed for students to take in between high school and university or vocational training, or for university students taking a year-long break from their studies. A semester-long program was subsequently introduced, branded as a gap semester, consisting only of the Voyage and Launch phases of the year-long program.

In 2018, UnCollege rebranded as Year On. The goal of the programs shifted to preparing students for life at university and in the world of work. The year-long program and the semester-long program were retained, and additional programs were added.

== Programs ==
Year On offered several programs. The year-long program had three phases: Explore, in which students take a service learning trip abroad; Focus, in which students learn life skills and work skills, and receive one-on-one mentorship; and Launch, in which students may take an internship, take an apprenticeship, work on a personal project, and/or apply for college. The semester-long program had students complete portions of the year-long program. The flexible program had students complete portions of the life skills, work skills, and/or self-directed learning curriculum, over a shorter period of time.

== Reception ==
Through his work with UnCollege, Stephens was named as one of Splashlife's 30 Under 30: Social Media Titans. UnCollege has been profiled in world publications like CNN, The New York Times, The Asia Times, ABC, Fast Company, Mashable, NPR, CBS, Inc., TechCrunch, and The Huffington Post.

== See also ==
- Academically Adrift
- In the Basement of the Ivory Tower
- Real Education: Four Simple Truths for Bringing America's Schools Back to Reality
