= In the Basement of the Ivory Tower =

- Author: Professor X
- Publisher: Viking Adult
- Publication date: 2011
- ISBN: 978-0-670-02256-4

In the Basement of the Ivory Tower: Confessions of an Accidental Academic is a 2011 book by an adjunct professor of English, who writes under the pen name Professor X. It is based on an Atlantic Monthly article of the same title. "Professor X teaches at a private college and at a community college in the northeastern United States" and argues that "The idea that a university education is for everyone is a destructive myth."

== Reception ==
The Christian Science Monitor praised Professor X, saying "the man can write", but criticized the book as "padded" from "a powerful essay". The New York Times praised the book as "a clear-eyed report from what the author calls 'the college of last resort'” but also criticizes its length. The New Yorker wrote of the author that "he’s smart and he’s generally good company", but criticized his personal details as "too vague to be engaging." In 2011 the Atlantic posted a follow-up essay from Professor X, in which he responded to feedback on his ideas but not criticism of his book.

== Reviews ==
- Sunday New York Times
- NY Times
- Christian Science Monitor
- Washington Post
- L.A. Times
- The Millions
- The New Yorker

== See also ==
- Academically Adrift
- Real Education: Four Simple Truths for Bringing America's Schools Back to Reality
- UnCollege
