= Losing Ground (book) =

1984 book by Charles Murray

Losing Ground: American Social Policy, 1950–1980
- Cover of the first edition
- Author: Charles Murray
- Language: English
- Subject: Welfare state
- Published: November 1984 (hardback); January 1994 (paperback)
- Publication place: United States
- Media type: Print
- Pages: 346
- ISBN: 978-0465065882

Losing Ground: American Social Policy, 1950–1980 is a 1984 book about the effectiveness of welfare state policies in the United States between 1950 and 1980 by the political scientist Charles Murray. Both its policy proposals and its methodology have attracted significant controversy.

== Background ==
Murray wrote the book while a fellow at the Manhattan Institute, then under the aegis of Irving Kristol. The Manhattan Institute funded his work on the book and also promoted it. Approximately $25,000 of the Manhattan Institute grant money for the book was provided by the John M. Olin Foundation. Joan Kennedy Taylor of the Manhattan Institute is credited with having brought the book into publication.

== Summary ==
Murray's main thesis is that social welfare programs, as they have historically been implemented in the United States, tend to increase poverty rather than decrease it because they create incentives rewarding short-sighted behavior not conducive to escaping poverty in the long term.

== Reception ==
Christopher Jencks wrote a detailed review in the May 9, 1985, issue of The New York Review of Books in which he describes the book as a work of "Social Darwinism" which owes its popularity not to its scientific rigor but rather to its utility in providing a veneer of "moral legitimacy for budget cuts that many politicians want to make in order to reduce the federal deficit." Murray responded to Jencks's critique, to which Jencks responded in turn.

The Institute for Research on Poverty at the University of Wisconsin–Madison published a special report with the views of poverty researchers affiliated with the Institute on Murray's claims. A 12-page summary was also published in their Focus magazine, in which the researchers "reject [Losing Ground's] broad condemnations of the Great Society", but they agreed that a new approach was needed for the 1980s to meet the goal of reducing poverty and crime.

In 1985, a few months after the book's release, an op-ed in The New York Times called it a budget-cutter's bible, also saying the book's "proposition may be as deeply flawed as it is startling, unlikely to survive scrutiny."

In a December 1993 interview with NBC News, then U.S. President Bill Clinton wrote of Murray and Losing Ground: "He did the country a great service. I mean, he and I have often disagreed, but I think his analysis is essentially right. ... There's no question that it would work. But the question is ... Is it morally right?"

In 2006, conservative pundit Michael Barone wrote that the book "undermined the case that welfare was a moral obligation" and that it inspired the welfare reform measures of the 1990s.

In his 2009 book Prisons of Poverty, sociologist Loïc Wacquant criticized the book for misinterpreting data in a way that purported to demonstrate that rising poverty levels after the 1960s were caused by the emergence of the social welfare state when according to Wacquant the data showed no such thing.
