= Rachel Carson Prize (academic book prize) =

- Awarded for: A book "of social or political relevance" in the field of science and technology studies
- Sponsored by: Society for Social Studies of Science
- Date: 1998
- Website: www.4sonline.org/what-is-4s/4s-prizes/

The Rachel Carson Prize is awarded annually by the Society for Social Studies of Science, an international academic association based in the United States. It is given for a book "of social or political relevance" in the field of science and technology studies. This prize was created in 1996.

== Honorees ==
Year	Recipient	Awarded work
1998	Diane Vaughan	The Challenger Launch Decision: Risky Technology, Culture, and Deviance at NASA
1999	Steven Epstein	Impure Science: AIDS, Activism, and the Politics of Knowledge
2000	Wendy Espeland	The Struggle for Water: Politics, Rationality, and Identity in the American Southwest
2001	Andrew Hoffman	From Heresy to Dogma: An Institutional History of Corporate Environmentalism
2002	Stephen Hilgartner	Science On Stage: Expert Advice as Public Drama
2003	Simon Cole	Suspect Identities: A History of Fingerprinting and Criminal Identification
2004	Jean Langford	Fluent Bodies
2005	Nelly Oudshoorn	The Male Pill
2006	Joseph Dumit	Picturing Personhood: Brain Scans and Biomedical Identity
2007	Charis Thompson	Making Parents: The Ontological Choreography of Reproductive Technologies
2008	Joseph Masco	The Nuclear Borderlands: The Manhattan Project in Post-Cold War New Mexico
2009	Jeremy Greene	Prescribing by Numbers
2010	Susan Greenhalgh	Just One Child
2011	Lynn M. Morgan	Icons of Life: A Cultural History of Human Embryos
2012	Stefan Helmreich	Alien Oceans
2013	Tim Choy	Ecologies of Comparison
2014	Robert N. Proctor	Golden Holocaust: Origins of the Cigarette Catastrophe and the Case for Abolition
2015	Gwen Ottinger	Refining Expertise. How responsible engineers subvert environmental justice challenges
2016	Gabrielle Hecht	Being Nuclear: Africans and the Global Uranium Trade
2017	Adia Benton	HIV Exceptionalism: Development Through Disease in Sierra Leone
2018	Kalindi Vora	Life Support: Biocapital and the New History of Outsourced Labor
2019	Aya Kimura	Radiation Brain Moms and Citizen Scientists: The Gender Politics of Food Contamination
2020	Sara Wylie	Fractivism: Corporate Bodies and Chemical Bonds
2021	Laura Watts	Energy at the End of the World: An Orkney Islands Saga
2022	Kregg Hetherington	The Government of Beans: Regulating Life in the Age of Monocrops
2023	Michele Ilana Friedner	Sensory Futures: Deafness and Cochlear Implant Infrastructures in India
2024	Helena Hansen, Jules Netherland, and David Herzberg	Whiteout: How Racial Capitalism Changed the Color of Opioids in America
2025	Emily Yates-Doerr	Mal-Nutrition: Maternal Health Science and the Reproduction of Harm

- 2026 - Angela Frederick
