= Real Education =

Book by Charles Murray

- Author: Charles Murray
- Publisher: Crown Forum
- Publication date: 2008
- ISBN: 978-0-307-40538-8

Real Education: Four Simple Truths for Bringing America's Schools Back to Reality is a 2008 book by Charles Murray. He wrote the book to challenge the "Educational romanticism [which] asks too much from students at the bottom of the intellectual pile, asks the wrong things from those in the middle, and asks too little from those at the top."

Murray claims that there are "four simple truths" about education:

1. "Ability varies."
2. "Half of the children are below average."
3. "Too many people are going to college."
4. "America's future depends on how we educate the academically gifted."

Critic Michael J. Feuer, writing in Issues in Science and Technology, in addition to Murray's "four simple truths", sees "an equally simplistic proposal:... [that] privatization will fix the schools."

When New York Times interviewer Deborah Solomon said, "I believe that given the opportunity, most people could do most anything," Murray responded, "You're out of touch with reality in that regard."

Times critic Charles McGrath defends the current educational system:

And yet for all its sloppiness, the present arrangement seems preferable to what Mr. Murray proposes: a vast system of certification exams whereby instead of going to college and sitting through courses in the history of rock 'n' roll or the comic book, you bone up on your chosen profession—law, accounting, social work, whatever—and pass a test. This would surely give rise to a cram-school industry that would dwarf even the current SAT-prep business and that, like the SAT, would unfairly reward the well off and those savvy enough to game the system.

President of St. John's College, Annapolis, Christopher B. Nelson, in what he called his "version of educational romanticism," agreed with some of Murray's premises but challenged his conclusions:

Of course ability varies and half the children are below average. Indeed, we should not set the college degree as our gold standard for success in life. We should teach people how to better make a living and to respect the work of the craftsmen and technicians among us. We should not stigmatize those Mr. Murray calls the "forgotten half." But neither should we abandon our efforts to provide each of our citizens with an opportunity to have the education that is required to keep us all watchful, wakeful protectors of our personal and political freedoms.

== See also ==
- Academically Adrift
- In the Basement of the Ivory Tower
- UnCollege
