= Human Diversity =

2020 book by Charles Murray

Human Diversity: The Biology of Gender, Race, and Class
- Author: Charles Murray
- Language: English
- Subject: Psychology, sociology, economics
- Published: 2020
- Publisher: Twelve (an imprint of Hachette Book Group)
- Publication place: United States
- Media type: Print, e-book
- Pages: 528 pp
- ISBN: 978-1538744017
- OCLC: 1135894646
- Dewey Decimal: 304.5
- LC Class: GN365.9 .M87 2020

Human Diversity: The Biology of Gender, Race, and Class is a 2020 non-fiction book written by the American political scientist Charles Murray, co-author of the book The Bell Curve. In the book, Murray argues against the scientific consensus that race is a social construct, as well as other orthodoxies such as the view that gender is a social construct, and class is a function of privilege.

== Reception ==
Writing for The New Republic, Alex Shephard described Human Diversity as an example of the "juggernaut" of conservative publishing. According to Shephard, claims of cancel culture and political correctness were used by the publisher Twelve (a division of Hachette) as a justification for publishing Murray, despite his "lack of scientific credentials and a penchant for relying on dubious sources". Shephard also quoted science journalist Angela Saini who told him that "we should really have left this behind by now".

In the National Review, journalist Robert VerBruggen called the book an "excellent primer for the uninitiated" while noting that it can be "pretty boring for those already familiar with the topics it covers" and also saying that Murray should've dealt more thoroughly with research "showing that environments do matter, sometimes a lot".

In The New York Times, literary critic Parul Sehgal criticizes Murray for not addressing the role of the environment further, ignoring information in genetics that might weaken his arguments, ignoring information contradicting his views on gender, and inconsistencies. As an example of Murray ignoring contradictory information, she cites a study to show that sexism is the culprit as to why women have not branched into more male dominated fields, rather than differences between the sexes.

Psychologist Douglas K. Detterman, reviewing the book in the journal Intelligence, agreed with Murray, and hoped "that there will be relatively little negative reaction to Human Diversity."

Science writer Philip Ball, reviewing the book for New Statesman, criticized the book for Murray's misplaced confidence in the alleged differences between male and female brains. Ball also says that Murray's claim that there is a natural predominance of men in STEM "is deluded" because it flies in the face of "masses of evidence" that women face discrimination in the sciences. Ball also criticizes Murray's discussion of race because he tries to redefine it as a "cluster of SNP variants". Ball points out that not only are SNP clusters silent on behavioural differences, but also that these clusters can be applied at all levels—between traditional populations of different cities, for example.
