= Academically Adrift =

2011 book by Richard Arum

Academically Adrift: Limited Learning on College Campuses
- Author: Richard Arum
- Language: English
- Published: 15 January 2011 University of Chicago Press
- Publication place: United States
- Pages: 272
- ISBN: 978-0226028552

Academically Adrift: Limited Learning on College Campuses is a book written by Richard Arum and Josipa Roksa, published by the University of Chicago Press in January 2011.

The book examines the current state of higher education in the United States. The book and its findings received extensive national media coverage and sparked a debate about what undergraduate students learn once they get into college.

The research draws on transcript data, the Collegiate Learning Assessment, and survey responses from more than 2,300 undergraduates at twenty-four institutions in their first semester and again at the end of their second year. The analysis reveals that 45 percent of these students demonstrated no significant improvement in a range of skills—including critical thinking, complex reasoning, and writing—during their first two years of college.

== See also ==
- In the Basement of the Ivory Tower
- Paying for the Party
- Real Education
- UnCollege

== Reviews ==
- Leef, George (25 January 2011). "No Work, All Play, No Job — Room for Debate". The New York Times. Archived from the original on 18 February 2011.
- Jaschik, Scott (18 January 2011). "News: 'Academically Adrift'". Inside Higher Ed. Archived from the original on 16 February 2011.
- Glenn, David (13 February 2011). "News: Scholars Question New Book's Gloom on Education". Chronicle of Higher Education.
- Bell, Steven (27 January 2011). "What Do We Do Now?". Library Journal.
- The New Yorker
