= Historiometry =

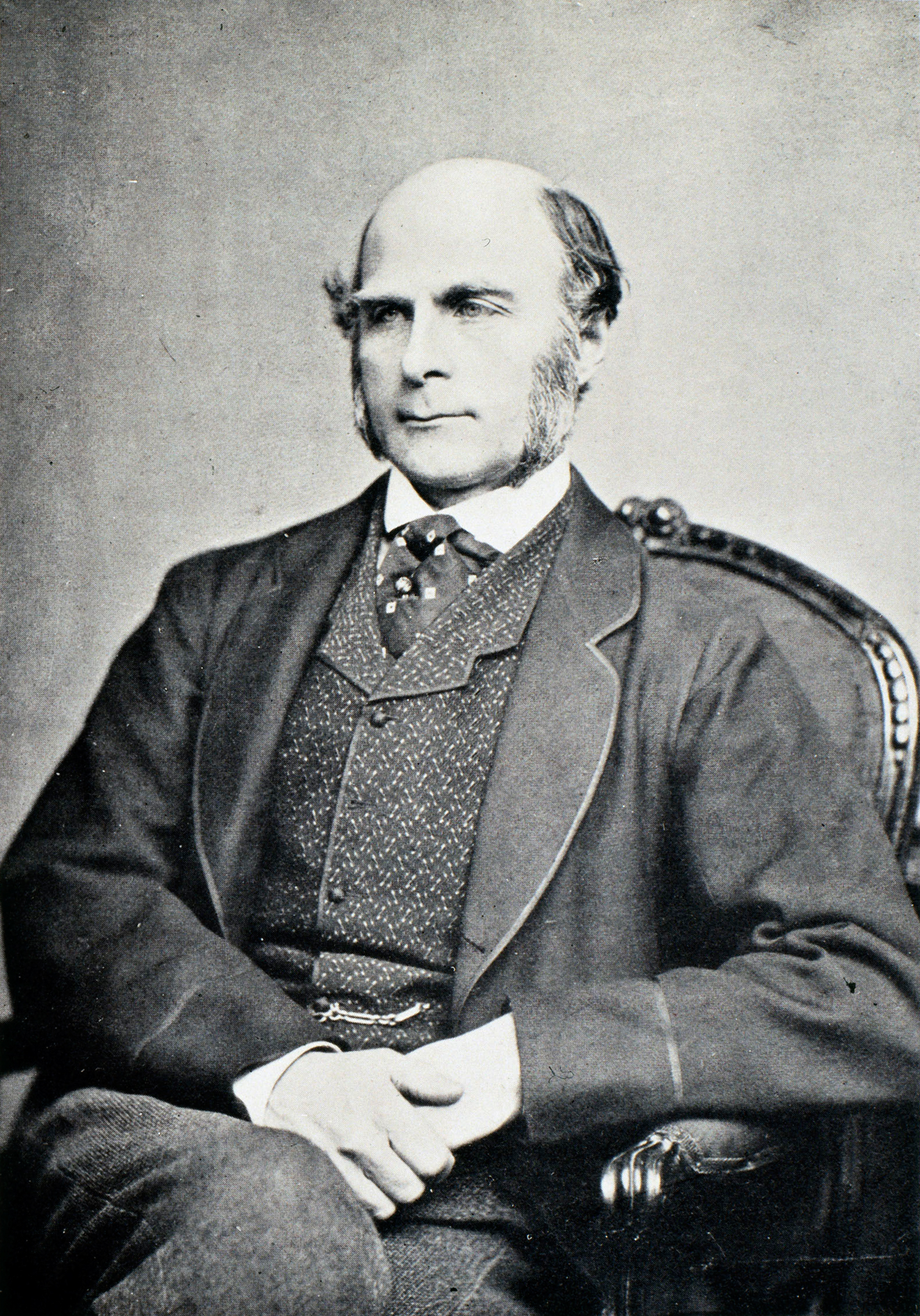
Francis Galton, one of the pioneers of historiometry

Historiometry is the historical study of human progress or individual personal characteristics, using statistics to analyze references to geniuses, their statements, behavior and discoveries in relatively neutral texts. Historiometry combines techniques from cliometrics, which studies economic history and from psychometrics, the psychological study of an individual's personality and abilities.

== Origins ==
Historiometry started in the early 19th century with studies on the relationship between age and achievement by Belgian mathematician Adolphe Quetelet in the careers of prominent French and English playwrights but it was Sir Francis Galton, an English polymath who popularized historiometry in his 1869 work, Hereditary Genius. It was further developed by Frederick Adams Woods (who coined the term historiometry) in the beginning of the 20th century. Also psychologist Paul E. Meehl published several papers on historiometry later in his career, mainly in the area of medical history, although it is usually referred to as cliometric metatheory by him.

Historiometry was the first field studying genius by using scientific methods.

== Current research ==
Prominent current historiometry researchers include Dean Keith Simonton and Charles Murray.

Historiometry is defined by Dean Keith Simonton as: a quantitative method of statistical analysis for retrospective data. In Simonton's work the raw data comes from psychometric assessment of famous personalities, often already deceased, in an attempt to assess creativity, genius and talent development.

Charles Murray's Human Accomplishment is one example of this approach to quantify the impact of individuals on technology, science and the arts. This work tracks many famous innovators in these areas, and quantifies how much attention to them has been paid by past historians, in terms of the number of references and the number of pages of reference material devoted to each subject. However, this work has been criticized for manipulating its data to derive conclusions that would not follow from unmanipulated data.

== Examples of research ==
Since historiometry deals with subjective personal traits as creativity, charisma or openness most studies deal with the comparison of scientists, artists or politicians. The study (Human Accomplishment) by Charles Murray classifies, for example, Einstein and Newton as the most important physicists and Michelangelo as the top ranking western artist. As another example, several studies have compared charisma and even the IQ of presidents and presidential candidates of the United States. The latter study classifies John Quincy Adams as the most clever US president, with an estimated IQ between 165 and 175. A historiometric analysis has also been applied successfully in the field of musicology. In one groundbreaking study, researchers analyzed statistically a collection of over 1,300 printed program leaflets (playbills) of concerts given by Clara Schumann (1819–1896) throughout her lifetime. The resulting analysis revealed Clara Schumann's influential role in the canonization of classical piano music repertoire. Her strategy of repertoire selection was guided by extremely traditionalistic tendencies.

== Critique ==
Since historiometry is based on indirect information like historic documents and relies heavily on statistics, the results of these studies are questioned by some researchers, mainly because of concerns about over-interpretation of the estimated results.

The previously mentioned study of the intellectual capacity of US presidents, a study by Dean Keith Simonton, attracted a lot of media attention and critique mainly because it classified the former US president, George W. Bush, as second to last of all US presidents since 1900. The IQ of G.W. Bush was estimated as between 111.1 and 138.5, with an average of 125, exceeding only that of president Warren Harding, who is regarded as a failed president, with an average IQ of 124. Although controversial and imprecise (due to gaps in available data), the approach used by Simonton to generate his results was regarded "reasonable" by fellow researchers. In the media, the study was sometimes compared with the U.S. Presidents IQ hoax, a hoax that circulated via email in mid-2001, which suggested that G.W. Bush had the lowest IQ of all US presidents.

== See also ==
- Catharine Cox
- Cliometrics
- Psychometrics
- Quantitative history
- Quantitative psychology
