= Steven Epstein (academic) =

American sociologist

Steven Epstein is the John C. Shaffer Professor in the Humanities and Professor in the Department of Sociology at Northwestern University. He spent 15 years as Professor of Sociology and Director of the Science Studies program at the University of California, San Diego.

== Education ==
Epstein received his bachelor's degree in social studies at Harvard College and his master's degree and PhD in sociology from the University of California, Berkeley in 1993.

== Career ==
He is widely published, and has written three books, Learning By Heart: AIDS and Schoolchildren in America's Communities, with David L. Kirp, Marlene Strong Franks, Jonathan Simon, Doug Conaway, and John Lewis (1989), Impure Science: AIDS, Activism, and the Politics of Knowledge (1996), and Inclusion: The Politics of Difference in Medical Research (2007). Impure Science has been reviewed by the New York Times, The Washington Post, and others. In 2009, Inclusion won the Distinguished Scholarly Book Award of the American Sociological Association.

Impure Science discusses how AIDS patients in the 1980s were able to transform their status from being a disease constituency to being experts in experience. AIDS activism was seen by many as being the template for patient and health groups' activities. The book won the C. Wright Mills Award for the best first book published by a sociologist and the Rachel Carson Prize of the Society for Social Studies of Science.
