= Voluntary System of Accountability =

Computer search tool for colleges

The Voluntary System of Accountability (VSA) and its College Portraits website was a college search tool for prospective students and an accountability tool for public institutions.

Students and their families used the College Portraits to find a presentation of comparable information that comes directly from public universities.

Participating institutions used the College Portraits to provide common information prospective students and families. Institutions and systems used the College Portraits to meet accountability requirements from governing boards, state legislatures, state coordinating offices, and other outside groups, often reducing their burden and duplication of effort. The College Portraits was also used for the accreditation process as evidence of student learning outcomes, institutional improvement, transparency, and commitment to the public good.

A joint project of the Association of Public and Land-grant Universities (APLU) and the American Association of State Colleges and Universities (AASCU) in collaboration with the higher education community, VSA became VSA Analytics in 2017 - an analytics tool that aggregates publicly available data from IPEDS, NSF, the College Scorecard, and the Student Achievement Measure. Institutions of higher education use the tool create custom peer groups for benchmarking and longitudinal analysis to support strategic planning.

== See also ==
- Association of Public and Land-grant Universities
- American Association of State Colleges and Universities
- Collegiate Learning Assessment
- ACT
- Educational Testing Service
