= Coming Apart (book) =

2012 book by Charles Murray

Coming Apart: The State of White America, 1960–2010
- Author: Charles Murray
- Language: English
- Published: 2012
- Publisher: Crown Forum
- Publication place: United States
- Media type: Print, eBook
- Pages: 416
- ISBN: 0307453421

Coming Apart: The State of White America, 1960–2010 is a 2012 book about class stratification of White Americans by Charles Murray, a political scientist and W.H. Brady Scholar at the American Enterprise Institute.

== Overview ==
Charles Murray describes what he sees as the economic divide and moral bifurcation of European Americans that has occurred since 1960. Murray describes diverging trends between poor and upper middle class White Americans in the half century after the death of John F. Kennedy. He focuses on White Americans to argue that economic decline in that period was not experienced solely by minorities, whom he brings into his argument in the last few chapters of the book. He argues that class strain has cleaved White Americans into two distinct, highly segregated strata: "an upper class, defined by educational attainment, and a new lower class, characterized by the lack of it. Murray also posits that the new [White] 'lower class' is less industrious, less likely to marry and raise children in a two-parent household, and more politically and socially disengaged."

Additionally, Murray writes of several differences he sees forming between and causing two emerging classes—the New Upper Class and the New Lower Class—among which are differences in or lack thereof in regard to religiosity, work ethic, industriousness, family, etc. Murray goes on to provide evidence that religiosity, work ethic, industriousness, family, etc., have either remained strong or have weakened minimally in the New Upper Class, whereas these same attributes have either weakened substantially or have become almost nonexistent in the New Lower Class. Much of his argument is centered on a notion of self-selective sorting that began in the 1960s and 1970s, when he argues that cognitive ability became the essential predictor of professional and financial success, and people overwhelmingly began marrying others in the same cognitive stratum and living in areas surrounded largely by others in that same stratum, leading to not only an exacerbation of existing economic divides, but an unprecedented socio-cultural divide that had not existed before in America.

== Reception ==
In his review in The New York Times, columnist David Brooks wrote, "I'll be shocked if there's another book that so compellingly describes the most important trends in American society."

Critics have complained that he cherry picked the data and time period under analysis, with The New York Times, for example, writing that "behaviors that seem to have begun in the 1960s belong to a much longer and more complex history than ideologically driven writers like Mr. Murray would have us believe."

Coming Apart was included in The New York Times's list of 100 Notable Books of 2012.
