= Philip Kasinitz =

American sociologist

- Born: September 18, 1957 (age 69)

Academic background
- Education: New York University; Boston University

Philip Kasinitz (born September 18, 1957) is an American sociologist. He is currently a Presidential Professor of Sociology at the CUNY Graduate Center where he has chaired the doctoral program in Sociology since 2001. He chaired CUNY's doctoral program in Sociology from 2001 to 2011, 2014-2017 and 2023-2024 and founded CUNY's Master's program in International Migration Studies. He directed its Advanced Research Collaborative from 2019 to 2024.

Kasinitz graduated Boston University in 1979 and earned his doctorate from New York University in 1987, where he studied primarily with Richard Sennett and Dennis Wrong. He specializes in immigration, ethnicity, race relations, urban social life and the nature of contemporary cities. Much of his work focuses on New York. He is the author of Caribbean New York for which he won the Thomas and Znaniecki Book Award in 1996. His co-authored book Inheriting the City: The Children of Immigrants Come of Age won the Eastern Sociological Society's Mirra Komarovsky Book Award in 2009 and the American Sociological Association Distinguished Scholarly Book Award in 2010. In 2022, he received the Distinguished Career Award from the International Migration Section of the American Sociological Association.

Kasinitz served as the President of the Eastern Sociological Society in 2007-2008 and was awarded the Society's “Merritt” Award for career contributions in 2015. Since 2005 he has been the book review editor of the ESS journal, Sociological Forum. He is a member of the Historical Advisory Board of the Statue of Liberty-Ellis Island Foundation and a former member of the Social Science Research Council's Committee on International Migration and the Russell Sage Foundation's committee to study the social effects of 9–11 on New York City.

Kasinitz is the author or co-author of more than 80 academic journal articles and book chapters. In addition, his work has appeared in CNN On Line, New York Newsday; The Nation; The Wall Street Journal, Dissent and Lingua Franca. Prior to coming to CUNY, Kasinitz taught at Williams College. He has held visiting appointments at Princeton University, The University of Amsterdam, the Technische Universität Berlin, The Netherlands Institute for Advanced Studies (NIAS), the Max-Planck-Institut zur Erforschung multireligiöser und multiethnischer Gesellschaften in Gottingen, Germany and the Departmento di Sociologica e Ricerca Sociale, at Universita di Trento (Italy).

== Selected publications ==
- Music, Immigration and the City: A Transatlantic Dialogue. (co-edited Marco Martiniello), Routledge 2020.
- Super-diversity and Everyday Life: A Trans-Atlantic Dialog. (co-edited Jan Willem Duyvendak and Nancy Foner), Routledge, 2019.
- Growing up Muslim in Europe and the United States. (co-edited with Mehdi Bozorgmehr), Routledge. 2018.
- Global Cities, Local Streets (with Sharon Zukin and Xiangming Chen), Routledge, 2015. (Chinese Translation, Tongji University Press, 2016; Korean Translation, Korea Research Institute for Human Settlements, 2017)
- The Urban Ethnography Reader (co-edited with Mitchell Duneier and Alexandra Murphy), Oxford University Press, 2013.
- Inheriting the City: The Children of Immigrants Come of Age (with John Mollenkopf, Mary C. Waters, and Jennifer Holdaway), Harvard University Press and Russell Sage Foundation Press, 2008.
- Becoming New Yorkers: Ethnographies of the New Second Generation (co-edited with Mary C. Waters and John H. Mollenkopf), Russell Sage Foundation Press, 2004.
- The Handbook of International Migration: The American Experience (with Charles Hirschman and Josh Dewind), Russell Sage Foundation, 1999.
- Metropolis: Center and Symbol of Our Times, London: MacMillan Ltd. and New York University Press, 1995.
- Caribbean New York: Black Immigrants and the Politics of Race, Cornell University Press, 1992.
