= Diane Vaughan =

American sociologist

Diane Vaughan is an American sociologist and professor at Columbia University. She is known for her work on organizational and management issues, in particular in the case of the space shuttle Challenger Disaster.

== Career ==
Diane Vaughan studied sociology at Ohio State University, and received her PhD in 1979. From 1979 to 1982 she was a Post-Doctoral Fellow in Sociology of Social Control at Yale University. From 1982 to 1984 she was a Research Associate, at Wellesley College Center for Research on Women, and then joined the Department of Sociology at Boston College. From 1986 to 1987 she was a Visiting Fellow, Centre for Socio-Legal Studies, Wolfson College, Oxford. She taught at Boston College from 1984 to 2005. Since 2005 she has been a professor of Sociology and International and Public Affairs at Columbia University.

== Awards ==
Vaughan is a laureate of the Public Understanding of Sociology Award, of the American Sociological Association.

The Challenger Launch Decision (1996) won the Rachel Carson Prize (inaugural winner) and the Robert K. Merton Award, as well as being nominated for the Pulitzer Prize and National Book Award.

== Work ==
In the understanding of safety and risk, Vaughan is perhaps best known for coining the phrase "normalization of deviance", which she has used to explain the sociological causes of the Challenger and Columbia disasters. Vaughan defines this as a process where a clearly unsafe practice comes to be considered normal if it does not immediately cause a catastrophe: "a long incubation period [before a final disaster] with early warning signs that were either misinterpreted, ignored or missed completely."

In the study of relationships, Vaughan is known for her research into the process of relationship breakups.

== Publications ==
=== Books ===
- Controlling Unlawful Organizational Behavior (1983).
- Uncoupling. Turning Points in Intimate Relationships (1986), Oxford University Press.
- The Challenger Launch Decision: Risky Technology, Culture and Deviance at NASA (1996), Chicago: University of Chicago Press.
- “Theorizing: Analogy, Cases, and Comparative Social Organization.”(2014) In: Richard Swedberg (ed.), Theorizing in the Social Sciences. Stanford: Stanford University Press, 61-8
- Vaughan, Diane (2021). Dead Reckoning: Air Traffic Control, System Effects, and Risk. University of Chicago Press. ISBN 9780226796406.

=== Peer-reviewed articles ===
2008 "Bourdieu and Organizations: the empirical challenge". Theory and Society, 37, pp.65-81

2006 "NASA Revisited: Theory, analogy, and public sociology". American Journal of Sociology, 112(2), pp.353-393

2004 "Theorizing Disaster: Analogy, historical ethnography, and the Challenger accident". Ethnography, 5(3), pp.315-347

1999 "The Dark Side of Organizations: Mistake, misconduct, and disaster". Annual Review of Sociology, 25(1), pp.271-305

1999 "The Role of the Organization in the Production of Techno-scientific Knowledge". Social Studies of Science, 29(6), pp.913-943

1998 "Rational Choice, Situated Action, and the Social Control of Organizations". Law & Society Review, 32(1), pp.23-61

1990 "Autonomy, Interdependence, and Social Control: NASA and the space shuttle Challenger". Administrative Science Quarterly, pp.225-257

1989 "Regulating Risk: Implications of the Challenger accident". Law & Policy, 11(3), pp.330-349

== See also ==
- Elephant in the room
- Groupthink
