= Richard Arum =

American sociologist

- Born: 1963 (age 62–63); New York, New York
- Education: Tufts University; Harvard University; University of California, Berkeley
- Occupation: Sociologist
- Website: www.faculty.uci.edu/profile/?facultyId=6235

Richard Arum (born 1963) is an American sociologist of education and stratification, best known for his research on student learning, school discipline, race, and inequality in K-12 and higher education.

Arum has a B.A. in political science from Tufts University, an M.Ed. in Teaching and Curriculum from the Harvard University Graduate School of Education, and a Ph.D. in sociology from the University of California, Berkeley.

He was the second dean of the University of California, Irvine School of Education, as well as a senior fellow at the Bill and Melinda Gates Foundation.

== Research and scholarship ==
=== Higher education ===
Arum's most notable contributions to research on higher education stem from his work on the CLA Longitudinal Study, a project he led as Education Research Program Director at the Social Science Research Council from 2005 to 2013. The CLA Longitudinal Study was a large-scale longitudinal study that “tracked over 2,000 young adults as they made their way through college and transitioned into the labor force and graduate school.” Academically Adrift: Limited Learning on College Campuses (University of Chicago Press, 2011) is a book based on the first two years of the study. It received national media attention for its finding that, after the first two years of college, a significant number of students demonstrated no improvement in a range of skills, including critical thinking, complex reasoning, and writing. A follow-up book to Academically Adrift, entitled Aspiring Adults Adrift: Tentative Transitions of College Graduates, was released in September 2014. Arum co-authored both of these books with Josipa Roksa, associate professor of sociology and education at the University of Virginia.

Since 2019, Arum has served as the project director for the University of California, Irvine, Measuring Undergraduate Success Trajectories (MUST) Project. The MUST project is a longitudinal measurement study that pioneers new approaches to gathering and analyzing educational data. This comprehensive effort aims to enhance institutional effectiveness, promote educational equity, and deepen societal understanding of the undergraduate experience. By developing metrics and analytical frameworks, this research combines administrative, learning management systems, performance assessment, experiential sampling methods, and survey data to paint a full picture of the value and character of undergraduate education.

=== K-12 education ===
Arum is author of Judging School Discipline: The Crisis of Moral Authority in American Schools (Harvard University Press, 2003), a book that examines the evolution of school discipline in the United States, and co-editor of Improving Learning Environments in Schools: Lessons from Abroad (Stanford University Press, 2012), an edited volume that examines school discipline from an international comparative perspective. He has also written several articles and book chapters on race and stratification in public and private schools.

From 2005 to 2009, as Program Director of Education Research at the Social Science Research Council, he led efforts to create the Research Alliance for New York City Schools, an entity that focuses on ongoing evaluation and assessment research to support public school improvement efforts.

From 2011 to 2016, Arum served as principal investigator of Connecting Youth, a multi-city research project on teen behaviors, attitudes, and competencies around digital media and learning. The purpose of this research is to document how a set of informal out-of-school programs and two schools (one in NYC and one in Chicago) are implementing initiatives that seek to encourage student-centered, peer-supported learning, the role of technology in learning, and how these elements shape youth trajectories.

== Selected publications ==
=== Books ===
- Arum, Richard and Josipa Roksa. Aspiring Adults Adrift: Tentative Transitions of College Graduates. Chicago: University of Chicago Press, 2014. (ISBN 9780226197289)
- Arum, Richard and Melissa Velez, eds. Improving Learning Environments in Schools: Lessons from Abroad. Stanford, CA: Stanford University Press, 2012.
- Arum, Richard and Josipa Roksa. Academically Adrift: Limited Learning on College Campuses. Chicago: University of Chicago Press, 2011. (ISBN 9780226028569)
- Shavit, Yossi, Richard Arum, and Adam Gamoran, eds. Stratification in Higher Education: A Comparative Study. Stanford, CA: Stanford University Press, 2007.
- Arum, Richard and Walter Mueller, eds. The Resurgence of Self-Employment: A Comparative Study of Self-Employment Dynamics and Social Inequality. Princeton, NJ: Princeton University Press, 2004.
- Arum Richard, with Irenee Beattie, Richard Pitt, Jennifer Thompson, and Sandra Way. Judging School Discipline: The Crisis of Moral Authority in American Schools. Cambridge, MA: Harvard University Press, 2003.

=== Articles ===
- Roksa, Josipa and Richard Arum. "Life after College: The Challenging Transitions of the Academically Adrift Cohort." Change Magazine July/August (2012).
- Roksa, Josipa and Richard Arum. "The State of Undergraduate Learning." Change Magazine March/April (2011).
- Stevens, Mitchell, Elizabeth Armstrong and Richard Arum. “Sieve, Incubator, Temple, Hub: Empirical and Theoretical Advances in the Sociology of Higher Education,” Annual Review of Sociology 34(2008):127-152.
- "The Effect of Racially Segregated Schools on African American and White Incarceration Rates, 1970 to 1990," with Gary LaFree, Criminology 44:1, 73-103 (2006)
- Arum, Richard. "Schools and Communities: Ecological and Institutional Dimensions," Annual Review of Sociology 26(2000):395-418.
- Arum, Richard. "Do Private Schools Force Public Schools to Compete?" American Sociological Review 61(1996):29-46.
