= Dean Simonton =

American psychologist

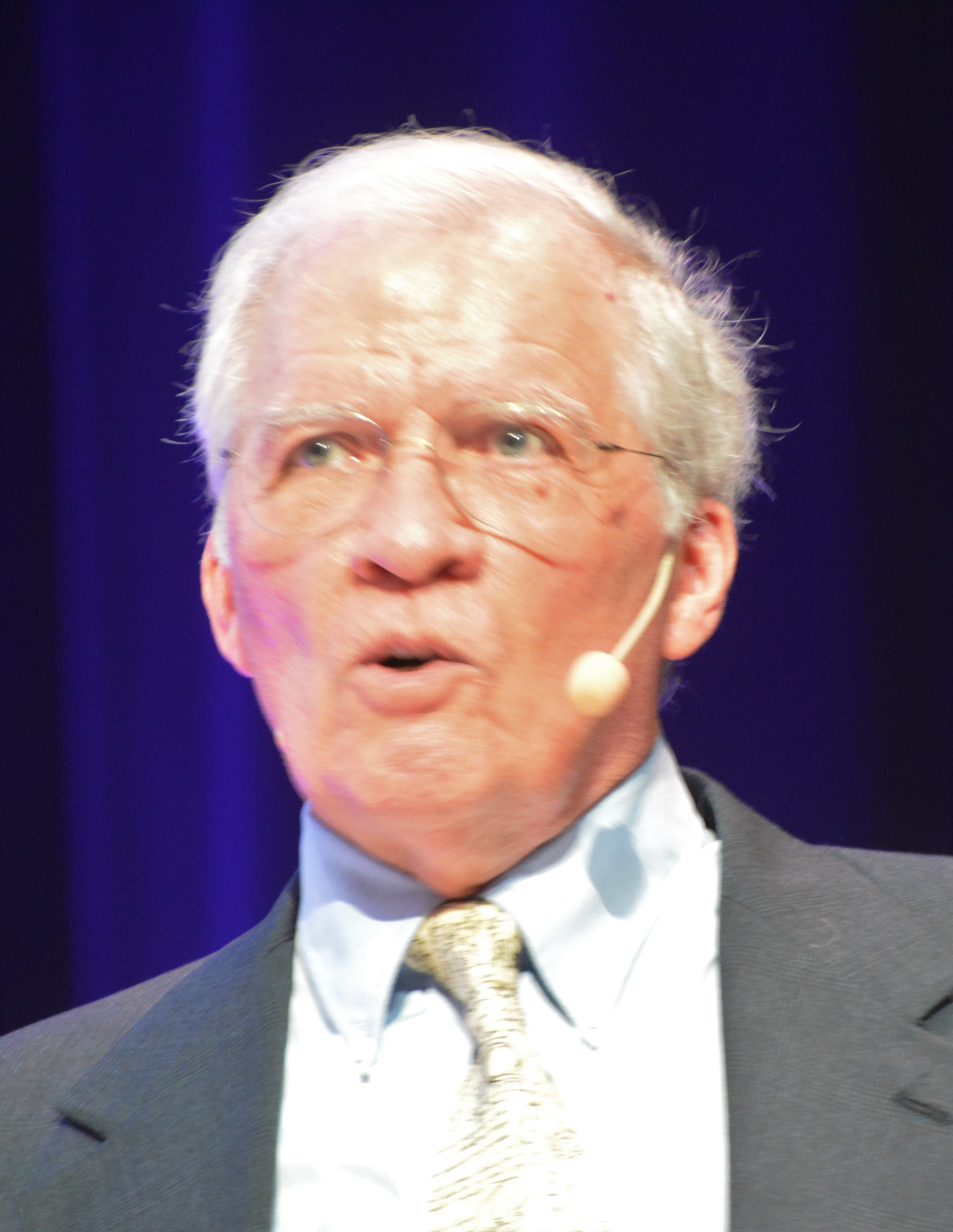
- Born: 1948 (age 77–78)
- Education: Occidental College (BA); Harvard University (MA, PhD)
- Known for: Creativity; Literature; Leadership; Politics; War
- Awards: Ernest R. Hilgard Lifetime Achievement Award (2023); Rudolf Arnheim Award for Outstanding Achievement in Psychology (2023); Mensa Lifetime Achievement Award, Mensa Foundation (2019); William James Book Award (2000)
- Scientific career
- Fields: Psychology
- Workplaces: University of California, Davis; University of Arkansas

Dean Keith Simonton (born January 27, 1948) is a Distinguished Professor Emeritus based in Davis, California, affiliated with the Department of Psychology at the University of California, Davis.

Simonton is known for his research in the fields of genius, creativity, leadership, and aesthetics. His work focuses on the cognitive, personal, developmental, social, and cultural factors contributing to eminence, giftedness, and talent across various domains such as science, philosophy, literature, music, art, cinema, politics, and war.

He has over 550 publications, including 14 books. One of his books, The Origins of Genius, received the William James Book Award.

== Early life and education ==
Dean Keith Simonton was born on January 27, 1948, in Glendale, California. Raised in the Los Angeles metropolitan area, he demonstrated exceptional academic ability from an early age. As a student at John H. Francis Polytechnic High School in Los Angeles, he graduated as salutatorian of his class in 1966, received multiple awards in science, English, and social studies, participated in advanced scientific enrichment programs, and served as captain of his school's Knowledge Bowl team.He enrolled at Occidental College, majoring in psychology while maintaining strong interests in history, philosophy, and scientific inquiry. During his undergraduate years he earned election to Phi Beta Kappa, graduated magna cum laude in 1970, became a College Scholar, and achieved a score above the 99th percentile on the Graduate Record Examination Psychology Subject Test.

Following graduation, Simonton entered the graduate program in social psychology at Harvard University, where he received a National Science Foundation Graduate Fellowship and a Danforth Foundation Fellowship. At Harvard he studied under prominent psychologists including David A. Kenny, while drawing intellectual inspiration from earlier traditions associated with David McClelland and the emerging quantitative study of personality and achievement. His doctoral general examinations were passed "with distinction," reportedly ranking first within his graduate cohort. Simonton earned an M.A. in Social Psychology in 1973 and completed his Ph.D. in Social Psychology in 1975. His doctoral dissertation, The Social Psychology of Creativity: An Archival Data Analysis, introduced the historiometric methodology that would become the defining feature of his academic career.

== Academic career ==
Following completion of his doctorate, Simonton joined the University of Arkansas as an assistant professor of psychology in 1974. There he taught undergraduate and graduate courses in general psychology, social psychology, and archival data analysis.

In 1976 Simonton joined the Department of Psychology at the University of California, Davis, an institution that would remain his academic home for the next four decades. Initially appointed assistant professor, he was promoted to associate professor in 1980 and to full professor in 1985. In 2004 he was named Distinguished Professor (Above Scale), one of the highest academic distinctions within the University of California system, before becoming Distinguished Professor Emeritus upon his retirement in 2016. Beyond his research, Simonton played an important role in university governance and academic administration. Within the Department of Psychology he served as Vice Chair, Graduate Program Chair, chair of undergraduate curriculum and advising committees, graduate adviser, honors adviser, and faculty sponsor for the Psi Chi honor society. In recognition of both his scholarly and educational achievements, Simonton received the UC Davis Prize for Teaching and Scholarly Achievement, the Distinguished Teaching Award of the Academic Senate, and the Robert S. Daniel Award from the American Psychological Association. He served as president of the Society for the Psychology of Aesthetics, Creativity and the Arts, the International Association of Empirical Aesthetics, the Society for General Psychology and Interdisciplinary Inquiry, and later the Society for the History of Psychology. His editorial work included serving as editor of the Journal of Creative Behavior and membership on the editorial boards of numerous leading journals in psychology, creativity, leadership, and personality research.

== Research ==
Simonton's research examines cognitive, personal, developmental, social, and cultural factors that underpin eminence and creativity. He employs archival data analysis techniques, including cross-cultural, transhistorical, biographical, and content analytical measures. His historiometric analyses shed light on eminent personalities, notable events, and creative products throughout history. He has also conducted laboratory experiments, mathematical models, meta-analyses, and other more mainstream methods. Additionally, Simonton explores the history of psychology, particularly focusing on the psychology of science and eminent scientists.

One of his findings was that the 10 years' experience of deliberate practice is not a rule, but an average with significant variation around the mean. He found that the people who achieved the greatest lifetime productivity and highest levels of eminence required the least amount of time to achieve expertise. He also found that while too much expertise can hurt one's chances of greatness, the downsides of overtraining in one domain can be ameliorated by the acquisition of expertise among numerous different domains.

He also found that an association of creativity with psychopathic traits was more apparent in artists than in scientists, and that artists who operate in expressive, subjective, or romantic styles display more psychopathology than those who operate in classical or academic styles.

In 2006, he published a paper that ranked the IQ, Openness, Intellectual Brilliance, and Leadership of all past 42 US presidents.

=== Psychology of genius and giftedness ===
A recurring theme in Simonton's work concerns the origins of genius and extraordinary talent. His research distinguishes giftedness from later creative eminence, arguing that exceptional achievement emerges through complex interactions among cognitive ability, personality, motivation, developmental experiences, expertise, and sociocultural opportunity. His books Origins of Genius (1999) and The Genius Checklist (2018) synthesized decades of research on eminent individuals and proposed multidimensional frameworks for understanding genius.

=== Psychology of science ===
Simonton has made contributions to the psychology of science through studies of scientific creativity, discovery, productivity, and eminence. His research examines how scientific breakthroughs emerge, why multiple independent discoveries occur, patterns of scientific careers, Nobel Prize-winning research, and the historical development of scientific disciplines. His book Scientific Genius (1988) is regarded as a foundational contribution to the field.

=== Leadership and political psychology ===
Another major area of Simonton's research concerns political leadership. Using historiometric analyses of American presidents, monarchs, military commanders, and other political leaders, he investigated the relationships between personality, leadership style, intelligence, creativity, historical context, and presidential greatness. His studies have contributed significantly to political psychology and leadership research, particularly through quantitative models of leadership effectiveness and historical reputation.

=== Psychology of aesthetics ===
Simonton has also contributed to empirical aesthetics, investigating artistic creativity, aesthetic judgment, and the factors associated with enduring artistic excellence. His research has analyzed the works of composers, playwrights, poets, painters, and other creative artists using quantitative and computational methods to identify characteristics associated with artistic originality and lasting cultural influence.

=== Creativity across the lifespan ===
A substantial portion of Simonton's research examines how creativity develops throughout adulthood. His studies challenged the assumption that creativity inevitably declines with age by demonstrating that patterns of peak achievement differ across disciplines according to their cognitive demands. His lifespan research has become widely cited within developmental psychology and creativity studies.

=== Scientific productivity ===
Simonton has conducted influential research on scientific productivity, career trajectories, publication patterns, citation impact, and the determinants of scholarly excellence. His studies have explored why some researchers sustain exceptional productivity over long careers while others experience shorter periods of peak achievement, contributing to the fields of scientometrics and the science of science.

=== Cinema and artistic creativity ===
Since the early 2000s, Simonton has increasingly investigated creativity within the film industry. His historiometric analyses have examined Academy Award-winning films, directors, screenwriters, actors, and cinematic genres, identifying psychological and historical factors associated with artistic and commercial success. This work has expanded empirical aesthetics into the study of popular culture and motion pictures.

=== Chance-configuration theory and evolutionary models of creativity ===
Among Simonton's best-known theoretical contributions is his evolutionary account of creativity, initially developed as the chance-configuration theory and later expanded through the Blind Variation and Selective Retention (BVSR) framework. Drawing inspiration from Charles Darwin's theory of evolution, Simonton argued that creative thought involves generating multiple novel ideas through partially blind variation, followed by the selective retention and refinement of those ideas that prove valuable or effective.

== Books ==
- Genius, creativity, and leadership: Historiometric inquiries Harvard University Press, 1984 (out of print);
- Why presidents succeed: A political psychology of leadership Yale University Press, 1987 (out of print);
- Scientific genius: A psychology of science Cambridge University Press, 1988 (in print);
- Psychology, science, and history: An introduction to historiometry, Yale University Press, 1990 (out of print);
- Greatness: Who makes history and why Guilford Press, 1994 (in print);
- Genius and creativity: Selected papers, Ablex (Praeger) Publishing, 1997 (in print);
- Origins of genius: Darwinian perspectives on creativity, Oxford University Press, 1999 (in print; ebook);
- Great psychologists and their times: Scientific insights into psychology's history, American Psychological Association, 2002 (out of print);
- Creativity in science: Chance, logic, genius, and zeitgeist, Cambridge University Press, 2004 (in print);
- Genius 101, Springer Publishing, 2009, (in print; ebook);
- Great flicks: Scientific studies of cinematic creativity and aesthetics, Oxford University Press, 2011 (in print; ebook);
- The social science of cinema (with J. C. Kaufman, co-editor), Oxford University Press, 2014 (in print, ebook);
- The Wiley handbook of genius (editor) Wiley, 2014 (in print; ebook)
- The Genius Checklist: Nine Paradoxical Tips on How You Can Become a Creative Genius, 2018

== Awards and memberships ==
Simonton is a member of the American Association for the Advancement of Science, Sigma Xi (The Scientific Research Honor Society), and many divisions of the American Psychological Association (APA).

=== Research awards ===
- Ernest R. Hilgard Lifetime Achievement Award, Division 1 - Society for General Psychology, APA (2023)
- Rudolf Arnheim Award for Outstanding Achievement in Psychology and the Arts, Division 10 - Society for the Psychology of Aesthetics, Creativity and the Arts, APA (1997)
- Sir Francis Galton Award for Outstanding Contributions to the Study of Creativity, International Association of Empirical Aesthetics (IAEA, 1996)
- Henry A. Murray Award for Distinguished Contributions to the Study of Individual Lives and Whole Persons, Association for Research in Personality and the Society for Personology (2014)
- Joseph B. Gittler Award for the Most Scholarly Contribution to the Philosophical Foundation of Psychological Knowledge, American Psychological Foundation (2013)
- E. Paul Torrance Award, Creativity Network, National Association for Gifted Children (NAGC, 2010)
- Distinguished Scientific Contributions to Media Psychology Award, Division 46 - Society for Media Psychology and Technology, APA (2013)
- Mensa Lifetime Achievement Award, Mensa Foundation (2008)

=== Research publication awards ===
- William James Book Award, Division 1 - Society for General Psychology, APA (2000)
- George A. Miller Outstanding Article Award, Division 1 - Society for General Psychology, APA (1997)
- Theoretical Innovation Prize, Division 8 - Society for Personality and Social Psychology, APA (2004)
- Mensa Award for Excellence in Research, Mensa Education & Research Foundation (1986, 2009, 2011)
- Otto Klineberg Intercultural and International Relations Honorable Mention, Division 9 - Society for the Psychological Study of Social Issues, APA (1997)

== Fellowships ==
- Fellow, American Association for the Advancement of Science (1998)
- Fellow, American Psychological Association (1983- ), 12 Divisions
- Fellow, Association for Psychological Science (1990)
- Fellow, International Association of Empirical Aesthetics (1998)
- Fellow, Western Psychological Association (2010)
- Charter Fellow, American Association of Applied and Preventative Psychology (1992)
