= John Markoff (sociologist) =

Professor of Sociology and History at the University of Pittsburgh (born 1942)

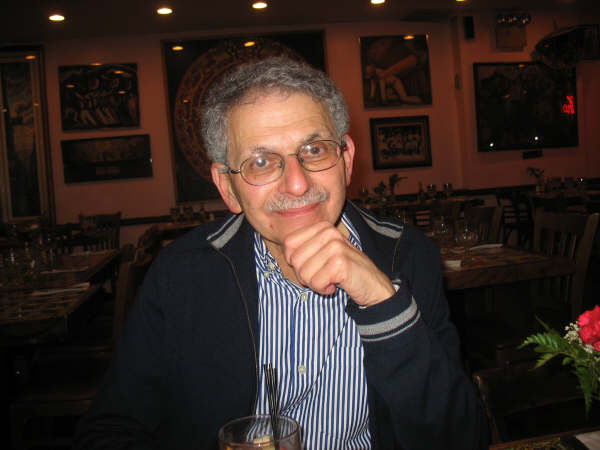
- Born: 1942 (age 83–84)

Academic background
- Education: Columbia University (BA); Johns Hopkins University (PhD)

Academic work
- Discipline: Sociology; History
- Institutions: City College of New York; Pablo de Olavide University; University of Pittsburgh

John Markoff (born 1942) is an American sociologist working as a distinguished professor of sociology and history at the University of Pittsburgh.

== Education ==
Markoff received a Bachelor of Arts from Columbia University in 1962 and a PhD from Johns Hopkins University in 1972.

== Career ==
Prior to taking a position at University of Pittsburgh in 1972, Markoff taught at the City College of New York. He has also done research at the Pablo de Olavide University in Seville.

He has published extensively in sociological, historical, and political science journals. He states that his research "concerns the history of democratization, considered as a multi-continental process across several centuries".

== Representative publications ==
- The Great Wave of Democracy in Historical Perspective (1994), ISBN 0-8014-9658-6
- Waves of Democracy: Social Movements and Political Change (1996), ISBN 0-8039-9019-7
- The Abolition of Feudalism: Peasants, Lords, and Legislators in the French Revolution (1996), ISBN 0-271-01538-1
- Revolutionary Demands: A Content Analysis of the Cahiers de Doléances of 1789 (1998), ISBN 0-8047-2669-8

== See also ==
- History of democracy
