= List of awards named after people =

This is a list of awards that are named after people.

== A ==
Award	Named after	Field	Achievement	Source
Abdus Salam Award	Abdus Salam	Science	Awarded to Pakistani nationals for achievement in the field of chemistry, mathematics, physics, or biology	
Abel Prize	Niels Henrik Abel	Mathematics	Awarded for outstanding scientific work in the field of mathematics, often described as the "mathematician's Nobel prize"	
Jack Adams Award	Jack Adams	Ice hockey	The National Hockey League coach "adjudged to have contributed the most to his team's success."	
Aga Khan Trophy	Aga Khan III	Equestrianism		
Aga Khan Award for Architecture	Aga Khan IV	Architecture	Architectural concepts that successfully address the needs and aspirations of Islamic societies in the fields of contemporary design	
Alexander Agassiz Medal	Alexander Agassiz	Oceanography	Original contributions in the science of oceanography	
John Agro Special Teams Award	John Agro	Canadian football	Most outstanding special teams player in the Canadian Football League	
Akatsuka Award	Fujio Akatsuka	Manga	To new manga artists, in the category of comedic manga	
Michelle Akers Player of the Year Award	Michelle Akers	Football (soccer)	Most valuable player in Women's Professional Soccer (league and award defunct)	
Akutagawa Prize	Ryūnosuke Akutagawa	Literature	The best serious literary story published in a newspaper or magazine by a new or rising author	
Ali–Frazier Award	Muhammad Ali and Joe Frazier	Boxing	Fight of the year, as determined by the Boxing Writers Association of America	
Anthony-Maroulis Trophy	Victoria Anthony and Helen Maroulis	Wrestling	Most outstanding women's college wrestler in the U.S.	
Antim Cup	Antim Iverianul	Rugby union	Victory in a senior international rugby union match, other than World Cup matches or qualifiers, between the teams of Romania and Georgia	
Edward Appleton Medal and Prize	Edward Victor Appleton	Physics	Distinguished research in environmental, earth or atmospheric physics	
Archibald Prize	J. F. Archibald	Portraiture	The best portrait, preferentially of some man or woman distinguished in art, letters, science or politics, painted by an artist resident in Australia	
Arjuna Award	Arjuna	Sports	Outstanding achievement in national sports in India	
Arthur Ashe Courage Award	Arthur Ashe	Sports	Significant or compelling humanitarian contribution, transcending sports, by a sports-related figure. One of the ESPY Awards.	
Astor Cup	Vincent Astor	Auto racing	Originally awarded to winners of the Astor Challenge Cup races (1915–1916), now used as the championship trophy for the IndyCar Series.	
Ayukawa Tetsuya Award	Tetsuya Ayukawa	Mystery fiction	For unpublished mystery novels	
Az-Zubair Prize for Innovation and Scientific Excellence	Az-Zubair Mohammed Salih	Science	For scientific innovation and creativity in applied and technological fields	
Aziz Sancar Science Awards	Aziz Sancar	Health Sciences	Significant contributions to health sciences and technologies at the international level in Turkey	

== B ==
Award	Named after	Field	Achievement	Source
IEEE Computer Society Charles Babbage Award	Charles Babbage	Computer Science	Significant contributions in the field of parallel computing	
Hobey Baker Award	Hobey Baker	Ice hockey	Outstanding player in NCAA men's college hockey	
Baly Medal	William Baly	Physiology	£400 to provide a gold medal for the person deemed to have most distinguished himself in the science of physiology, especially during the previous two years.	
Lorenzo Bandini Trophy	Lorenzo Bandini	Auto racing		
Bartolozzi Prize	Giuseppe Bartolozzi			
Batchelor Prize	George Batchelor	Fluid dynamics	Awarded once every four years to a single scientist for outstanding research in the field of fluid dynamics	
Sammy Baugh Trophy	Sammy Baugh	American football	Outstanding passing quarterback in Division I FBS college football	
Beal Prize	Andrew Beal	Mathematics	$1 million prize is awarded for either a proof or a counterexample of the Beal conjecture, a generalization of Fermat's Last Theorem, published in a refereed and respected mathematics publication	
Becquerel Prize	Edmond Becquerel	Solar Energy	Individual with outstanding contributions to solar energy	
Beazley Medal	Kim Edward Beazley			
Chuck Bednarik Award	Chuck Bednarik	American football	Outstanding defensive player in Division I FBS	
Clair Bee Coach of the Year Award	Clair Bee	Basketball	Positive contributions by an NCAA Division I men's head coach	
IEEE Alexander Graham Bell Medal	Alexander Graham Bell	Telecommunications	Exceptional contributions to the advancement of communications sciences and engineering in the field of telecommunications	
Gordon Bennett Cup	James Gordon Bennett, Jr.	Auto racing		
Gordon Bennett Cup	James Gordon Bennett, Jr.	Ballooning		
Marcel Benoist Prize	Marcel Benoist			
Jun Bernardino Trophy	Jun Bernardino	Basketball	PBA Philippine Cup championship trophy	
Fred Biletnikoff Award	Fred Biletnikoff	American football	Outstanding wide receiver in Division I FBS	
Vilhelm Bjerknes Medal	Vilhelm Bjerknes	Meteorology	"distinguished research in atmospheric sciences."	
Elizabeth Blackwell Medal	Elizabeth Blackwell	Medicine	Woman physician "who has made the most outstanding contributions to the cause of women in the field of medicine."	
Bledisloe Cup	Charles Bathurst	Rugby union	Challenge trophy between the national teams of Australia and New Zealand	
Katharine Burr Blodgett Medal and Prize	Katharine Burr Blodgett	Physics	Contributions to the organisation or application of physics in an industrial or commercial context	
Tom W. Bonner Prize	Tom W. Bonner			
Border–Gavaskar Trophy	Allan Border and Sunil Gavaskar	Cricket	Challenge trophy between the national teams of Australia and India	
Max Born Medal and Prize	Max Born	Physics	Outstanding contributions to Physics	
Fernando Botero Prize	Fernando Botero	Art	Latin American artists aged under 35, administered by the Foundation of Young Colombian Artists	
The National Bobby Bowden Award	Bobby Bowden	American football	Outstanding achievement by a Division I FBS player on the field, as a student, and as a "faith model" in the community	
Bobby Bowden National Collegiate Coach of the Year Award	Bobby Bowden	American football	Outstanding head coach in Division I FBS	
Bradbury Award	Ray Bradbury	Screenwriting	Excellence in screenwriting	
Bouclier de Brennus	Charles Brennus	Rugby union	French Top 14 championship trophy	
Chris Bristow Trophy	Chris Bristow	Auto racing		
Peter Brock Trophy	Peter Brock	Motorsport	Winners of the Bathurst 1000 race	
Brownlow Medal	Charles Brownlow	Australian rules football	"Fairest and best" player in the Australian Football League	
Broyles Award	Frank Broyles	American football	Outstanding assistant coach in Division I FBS	
Bruce Medal	Catherine Wolfe Bruce	Astronomy	Outstanding lifetime contributions to astronomy.	
W. S. Bruce Medal	William Spiers Bruce	Geography	Contributions to polar zoology, botany, geology, meteorology, oceanography or geography.	
Buck Buchanan Award	Buck Buchanan	American football	Outstanding defensive player in Division I FCS	
John Bunn Award	John Bunn	Basketball	Significant lifetime achievement in any role within the sport, as determined by the Naismith Memorial Basketball Hall of Fame	
Burlsworth Trophy	Brandon Burlsworth	American football	Most outstanding player in Division I FBS who began his college career as a walk-on	
Vannevar Bush Award	Vannevar Bush			
Butkus Award	Dick Butkus	American football	Outstanding linebackers in the NFL, college, and high school	
Walter Byers Scholarship	Walter Byers	Sports	Outstanding student-athletes, male and female, across all NCAA sports	
Lady Byng Memorial Trophy	Evelyn Byng	Ice hockey	NHL "player adjudged to have exhibited the best type of sportsmanship and gentlemanly conduct combined with a high standard of playing ability"	

== C ==
Award	Named after	Field	Achievement	Source
Caccioppoli Prize	Renato Caccioppoli	Mathematics	Outstanding achievement by an Italian mathematician no older than 38	
Caldecott Medal	Randolph Caldecott	Literature		
Camões Prize	Luís de Camões	Literature	Outstanding work in the Portuguese language	
Clarence S. Campbell Bowl	Clarence Campbell	Ice hockey	NHL Western Conference championship trophy	
John J. Carty Award for the Advancement of Science	John J. Carty	Science	"Noteworthy and distinguished accomplishments in any field of science within the charter of the Academy" (i.e., the National Academy of Sciences in the U.S.)	
Miguel de Cervantes Prize	Miguel de Cervantes	Literature	Outstanding lifetime achievement by a Spanish-language writer	
Chappell–Hadlee Trophy	The Chappell brothers (Ian, Gregory, and Trevor) and the Hadlee family (father Walter and sons Barry, Dayle, and Sir Richard)	Cricket	Challenge trophy contested in annual ODI series between Australia and New Zealand	
R. K. Cho Economics Prize	R. K. Cho	Economics	Contributions to the development of scholarship and education	
Agatha Award	Agatha Christie	Mystery fiction		
Agatha Christie Award (Japan)	Agatha Christie	Mystery fiction		
Clive Churchill Medal	Clive Churchill	Rugby league football	Best and fairest player in the National Rugby League's Grand Final	
King Clancy Memorial Trophy	King Clancy	Ice hockey	Outstanding leadership and exceptional humanitarian contributions by an NHL player	
Clarkson Cup	Adrienne Clarkson	Ice hockey	Canadian National Women's Hockey Championship trophy	
Roger Clemens Award	Roger Clemens	Baseball	Outstanding pitcher in NCAA Division I baseball	
Roberto Clemente Award	Roberto Clemente	Baseball	Major League Baseball player who "best exemplifies the game of baseball, sportsmanship, community involvement and the individual's contribution to his team"	
David Cohen Prize	David and Victoria Cohen	Literature	Outstanding body of work by a British citizen writing in English	
Lionel Conacher Award	Lionel Conacher	Sports	Canadian male athlete of the year throughout all sports	
Tony Conigliaro Award	Tony Conigliaro	Baseball	Major League Baseball player who best overcomes extreme physical or emotional adversity	
Pat Conroy Southern Book Prize	Pat Conroy	Literature	Southern Independent Booksellers Alliance favorite hand-sell book of the year (only 2016)	
Duff Cooper Prize	Duff Cooper	Literature	Best work of history, biography, political science or (very occasionally) poetry, published in English or French	
Ron Coote Cup	Ron Coote	Rugby league football	Victory in annual match between National Rugby League teams the Parramatta Eels and Sydney Roosters	
Copley Medal	Godfrey Copley	Science	"Outstanding achievements in research in any branch of science, and alternates between the physical sciences and the biological sciences"; awarded by the Royal Society of London to scientists of any nationality	
Jon Cornish Trophy	Jon Cornish	American football	Top Canadian player in NCAA Division I football	
Alec Courtelis Award	Alec Courtelis	Academic merit	Academic merit and outstanding contribution by graduating non-U.S. students at the University of Florida	
Bob Cousy Award	Bob Cousy	Basketball	Outstanding point guard in U.S. men's college basketball	
Robert Cox Cup	Robert Cox	Golf	U.S. Women's Amateur championship trophy	
Crafoord Prize	Holger Crafoord	Science	Outstanding basic research in astronomy and mathematics, biosciences, geosciences or polyarthritis	
Roger Crozier Saving Grace Award	Roger Crozier	Ice hockey	NHL goaltender with the season's best save percentage (minimum of 25 games played)	
Johan Cruijff Shield	Johan Cruyff	Football (soccer)	Dutch Super Cup trophy (contested by winners of the Eredivisie and KNVB Cup)	
Edith Cummings Munson Golf Award	Edith Cummings	Golf	Top collegiate female golfer who excels in academics	
Cunningham Medal	Timothy Cunningham	Science, literature and antiquities	Awarded every 3 years for best essay in science, literature or antiquities by a member of the Royal Irish Academy	
Currie Cup	Donald Currie	Rugby union	South African first-tier provincial championship trophy (and also the overall competition)	
Curtis Cup	Harriot and Margaret Curtis	Golf	Challenge trophy contested by women's amateur teams representing the US and Great Britain & Ireland	

== D ==
Award	Named after	Field	Achievement	Source
Chuck Daly Lifetime Achievement Award	Chuck Daly	Basketball	This annual award is given to an NBA coach to honor their life in basketball.	
David Dewhurst Medal	David John Dewhurst	Biomedical engineering	Outstanding contribution to Biomedical Engineering.	
Leo Dandurand Trophy	Léo Dandurand	Canadian football	Most outstanding offensive lineman in the CFL East Division. This individual becomes one of the two finalists for the CFL's Most Outstanding Offensive Lineman Award.	
Darwin Awards	Charles Darwin	Life	Awarded to "people who ensure the long-term survival of the human race by removing themselves from the gene pool in a sublimely idiotic fashion"	
Darwin Medal	Charles Darwin	Biology	Awarded for work of acknowledged distinction in the broad area of biology in which Darwin worked	
Darwin–Wallace Medal	Charles Darwin and Alfred Russel Wallace	Biology	Awarded annually for best work on evolutionary biology	
Hunter Davies Lakeland Book of the Year	Hunter Davies	Books	Awarded annually for a book about or set in Cumbria, England.	
Leonardo da Vinci International Art Award	Leonardo da Vinci	Arts, science, technology, and literature	Presented to young people involved in the study of the sciences, technology, literature and the arts	
Leonardo da Vinci World Award of Arts	Leonardo da Vinci	Arts	Recognition of significant contribution to the artistic legacy of the world.	
ASME Leonardo Da Vinci Award	Leonardo da Vinci	Engineering	Eminent achievement in the design or invention of a product which is universally recognized as an important advance in machine design	
Davis Cup	Dwight F. Davis	Tennis	Winner of an annual tournament involving men's national teams (and also the competition itself)	
Davy Medal	Humphry Davy	Chemistry	"Outstandingly important recent discovery in any branch of chemistry", as determined by the Royal Society of London	
Dazai Osamu Prize	Osamu Dazai	Literature		
DeMarco–Becket Memorial Trophy	Mario DeMarco and Mel Becket	Canadian football	Most outstanding offensive lineman in the CFL West Division. This individual becomes one of the two finalists for the CFL's Most Outstanding Offensive Lineman Award.	
Demidov Prize	Pavel Demidov	Science	Originally (1832–1866) awarded for outstanding achievement by a member of the Russian Academy of Sciences. Revived in 1993 for outstanding achievement in natural sciences or humanities by a member of the same body.	
Lord Derby Cup	Edward Stanley, 17th Earl of Derby	Rugby league football	Victory in French knockout cup competition	
Dewar Cup Trophy	Thomas Dewar, 1st Baron Dewar	Football (soccer)	Originally awarded to the winner of the U.S. National Challenge Cup (now the Lamar Hunt U.S. Open Cup). The trophy is now retired and is on permanent display at the National Soccer Hall of Fame in Oneonta, New York, but the name of each winning team is still added to its base.	
Joe Dey Award	Joseph Dey	Golf	Recognition of meritorious service to the game of golf as a volunteer.	
Dick Baumbach PR Professional of the Year	Dick Baumbach	Public Relations	Recognition of public relations professionalism throughout the year decided by Space Coast FPRA leadership.	
Dijkstra Prize	Edsger Dijkstra	Computer Science	Outstanding work on the principles of distributed computing, whose significance and impact on the theory and/or practice has been evident for at least a decade.	
Dirac Medal of the ICTP	Paul Dirac	Physics	Outstanding work in theoretical or mathematical physics. Prior winners of the Fields Medal, Wolf Prize, or a Nobel Prize are ineligible.	
Dirac Medal of the WATOC	Paul Dirac	Chemistry	Outstanding computational chemist under age 40	
Paul Dirac Medal and Prize	Paul Dirac	Physics	"Outstanding contributions to theoretical (including mathematical and computational) physics"	
David Dixon Award	David Dixon	Sport	Outstanding competitor in the Commonwealth Games	
Maggie Dixon Award	Maggie Dixon	Basketball	Outstanding first-year head coach in NCAA Division I women's college basketball	
Belisario Domínguez Medal of Honor	Belisario Domínguez	Order of merit	Distinguished lifetime contribution by a Mexican to the national welfare; the highest award in Mexico's honors system	
Domon Ken Prize	Ken Domon	Photography		
David di Donatello	Donatello	Cinema	Outstanding work in Italian cinema in 24 categories	
Landon Donovan MVP Award	Landon Donovan	Association football	Most valuable player in Major League Soccer	
Charles Stark Draper Prize	Charles Stark Draper	Engineering	Advancement of engineering and the education of the public about engineering, as determined by the (U.S.) National Academy of Engineering	
Draper Memorial Medal	David Draper	Geology	For a significant contribution to the discipline of geology and to the furtherance of South African geology	
Henry Draper Medal	Henry Draper	Astronomy	Outstanding contributions in astrophysics, as determined by the (U.S.) National Academy of Sciences	
Dronacharya Award	Dronacharya	Sports	Excellence by an Indian sports coach	
Joe Dumars Trophy	Joe Dumars	Basketball	NBA player who "exemplifies the ideals of sportsmanship on the court—ethical behavior, fair play and integrity." The trophy is named after Joe Dumars, the first recipient of what is more commonly called the NBA Sportsmanship Award.	
Dunsmore Cup	Bob Dunsmore	Canadian football	RSEQ (Quebec) university championship	
Hugh Durham Award	Hugh Durham	Basketball	Outstanding coach at a mid-major school in NCAA Division I men's college basketball	
The Dyson Award	Geoff Dyson	Sports coaching	"Sustained and significant contribution to the development and management of coaching and individual coaches in the UK." Awarded 1999–2007.	
James Dyson Award	James Dyson	Design	Outstanding work in product design, industrial design, or design engineering by a graduating university student (or recent graduate) studying in one of 18 specified countries	

== E ==
Award	Named after	Field	Achievement	Source
John Eales Medal	John Eales	Rugby union	Outstanding player on the Australia national team, as chosen by team members	
Harley J. Earl Trophy	Harley Earl	Auto racing	Daytona 500 winner's trophy	
J J Ebers Award	Jewell James Ebers	Electronics	Outstanding advances in electron devices	
IEEE Edison Medal	Thomas Edison	Electrical engineering	Honors "a career of meritorious achievement in electrical science, electrical engineering or the electrical arts"	
Edogawa Rampo Prize	Rampo Edogawa	Mystery fiction		
Albert Einstein Award	Albert Einstein	Physics	High achievement in natural science of theoretical physics (1951–1979)	
Albert Einstein Medal	Albert Einstein	Science	Outstanding service in connection with Einstein	
Albert Einstein World Award of Science	Albert Einstein	Science	Outstanding research that directly benefits humanity	
Eisenhower Trophy	Dwight D. Eisenhower	Golf	World championship for men's national amateur teams	
Ella–Mobbs Trophy	Mark Ella and Edgar Mobbs	Rugby union	Challenge trophy contested between Australia and England	
Emmett Leahy Award	Emmett Joseph Leahy	Records and Information Management	Outstanding Contributions and Accomplishments that Have a Major Impact on the Records and Information Management	
Eisner Award	Will Eisner	Comics	Outstanding achievement in the U.S. comics industry in nearly 50 categories	
Webb Ellis Cup	William Webb Ellis	Rugby union	Rugby World Cup championship trophy	
Erasmus Prize	Erasmus	Society and culture	Notable contributions to European society, culture, or social science	
Eringen Medal	Eringen	Society of Engineering Science	Sustained outstanding achievements in engineering science	
Terry Evanshen Trophy	Terry Evanshen	Canadian football	Most outstanding player in the CFL East Division. This individual becomes one of the two finalists for the CFL's Most Outstanding Player Award.	

== F ==
Award	Named after	Field	Achievement	Source
Fabri Literary Prize	Frances Fabri	Literature	Outstanding unpublished novel written for adults	
Faraday Medal	Michael Faraday	Engineering	Awarded either for notable scientific or industrial achievement in engineering or for conspicuous service rendered to the advancement of science, engineering and technology or for lifetime achievement in science, engineering or technology.	Institution of Engineering and Technology
Michael Faraday Prize	Michael Faraday	Science	Excellence in communicating science to UK audiences	
Heather Farr Player Award	Heather Farr	Golf	Awarded to an LPGA golfer "who, through her hard work, dedication and love of the game of golf, has demonstrated determination, perseverance and spirit in fulfilling her goals as a player."	
PEN/Faulkner Award for Fiction	William Faulkner	Literature	Best work of American fiction	
Antonio Feltrinelli Prize	Antonio Feltrinelli	See award article	Outstanding accomplishments in nine widely differing fields	
Enrico Fermi Award	Enrico Fermi	Science	Lifetime achievement in the development, use, or production of energy	
Prince of Asturias Awards	Felipe, Prince of Asturias	Science	Achievement in the sciences, humanities, and public affairs	
Norm Fieldgate Trophy	Norm Fieldgate	Canadian football	Most outstanding defensive player in the CFL West Division. This individual becomes one of the two finalists for the CFL's Most Outstanding Defensive Player Award.	
Fields Medal	John Charles Fields	Mathematics	Outstanding achievement by a mathematician under age 40	
Ambrose Fleming Medal	Ambrose Fleming	Telecommunications	Exceptional contribution to the advancement of telecommunication engineering and technology	Institution of Engineering and Technology
Florence Nightingale Medal	Florence Nightingale	Nursing	Exceptional courage and devotion to the wounded, sick or disabled or to civilian victims of a conflict or disaster	
Alphonso Ford Trophy	Alphonso Ford	Basketball	Leading scorer in the Euroleague	
NCAA Gerald R. Ford Award	Gerald R. Ford	Sports	Significant lifetime leadership as an advocate for college sports in the United States	
Fothergillian prize	John Fothergill	Medicine	Best written work on medical topic	
James E. Foy, V–ODK Sportsmanship Trophy	James E. Foy V	American football	Winner of the Iron Bowl, the annual game between the University of Alabama and Auburn University	
Benjamin Franklin Award	Benjamin Franklin	Life sciences	Promotion of free and open access to the materials and methods used in the life sciences	
Ford C. Frick Award	Ford Frick	Broadcasting	"Major contributions to baseball" as a broadcaster	

== G ==
Award	Named after	Field	Achievement	Source
Dennis Gabor Medal and Prize	Dennis Gabor	Physics	Distinguished contributions to the application of physics in an industrial, commercial or business context.	
Gagarin Cup	Yuri Gagarin	Ice hockey	Championship trophy of the Kontinental Hockey League	
Gagliardi Trophy	John Gagliardi	American football	Outstanding player in NCAA Division III college football	
Dave Gallaher Trophy	Dave Gallaher	Rugby union	Challenge trophy between France and New Zealand	
Gaisford Prize	Thomas Gaisford	Classical literature	Outstanding essay in Greek, and outstanding dissertation in Greek or Latin, by a University of Oxford student	
Gandhi Peace Award	Mahatma Gandhi	Peace	For ""contributions made in the promotion of international peace and good will." Awarded by the American organization Promoting Enduring Peace.	
Gandhi Peace Prize	Mahatma Gandhi	Peace	Contribution to social, economic, and political transformation by Gandhian methods. Awarded by the Government of India.	
Indira Gandhi Award for National Integration	Indira Gandhi	Peace	Distinguished contributions to promoting solidarity and understanding between groups in Indian society	
Indira Gandhi Prize for Peace, Disarmament and Development	Indira Gandhi	Peace	Contribution to peace, with a focus on disarmament and economic development	
Rajiv Gandhi Khel Ratna	Rajiv Gandhi	Sports	Indian sportsperson of the year	
Giuseppe Garibaldi Trophy	Giuseppe Garibaldi	Rugby union	Challenge trophy between France and Italy	
Carl Friedrich Gauss Prize	Carl Friedrich Gauss	Mathematics	"Outstanding mathematical contributions that have found significant applications outside of mathematics"	
Gibbs Brothers Medal	William Francis Gibbs and Frederic H. Gibbs	Naval architecture & marine engineering	Outstanding contributions	
Frank M. Gibson Trophy	Frank M. Gibson	Canadian football	Most outstanding rookie (first-year player) in the CFL East Division. This individual becomes one of the two finalists for the CFL's Most Outstanding Rookie Award.	
Jack Gibson Cup	Jack Gibson	Rugby league football	Victory in annual match between National Rugby League teams the Parramatta Eels and Sydney Roosters	
G. K. Gilbert Award	Grove Karl Gilbert	Planetary Geology	For outstanding contributions to the solution of fundamental problems in planetary geology	
J. J. Giltinan Shield	J J Giltinan	Rugby league football	Winning the National Rugby League minor premiership	
Glover Prize	John Glover	Art	"The work judged the best contemporary painting of the Tasmanian landscape"	
Gödel Prize	Kurt Gödel	Computer science	Outstanding theoretical papers	
Albert Goldthorpe Medal	Albert Goldthorpe	Rugby league football	Player judged best in each Super League season by Rugby Leaguer & League Express	
Prix Goncourt	Edmond de Goncourt	Literature	"The best and most imaginative prose work of the year" in the French language	
Prix Goncourt des Lycéens	Edmond de Goncourt	Literature	Outstanding French language literary work, as selected by a group of about 2,000 lycée students (roughly equivalent to a high school in the English-speaking world)	
Curt Gowdy Media Award	Curt Gowdy	Sports journalism	Two awards for outstanding achievement in basketball media coverage—one to a writer and one to a sportscaster	
Jack Graney Award	Jack Graney	Sports journalism	Contributions to baseball in Canada by a member of the Canadian media, as determined by the Canadian Baseball Hall of Fame	
Grawemeyer Award	H. Charles Grawemeyer	Five different fields	Outstanding ideas in education, improving world order, music composition, religion, and psychology	
Mel Greenberg Media Award	Mel Greenberg	Sports journalism	Media member "who has best displayed a commitment to women's basketball and to advancing the role of the media in the women's game", as determined by the Women's Basketball Coaches Association.	
Grey Cup	Albert Grey, 4th Earl Grey	Canadian football	Canadian Football League championship trophy (and also the game in which it is contested)	
George Gross Memorial Trophy	George Gross	Football (soccer)	Most valuable player in the Canadian Championship	
Lou Groza Award	Lou Groza	American football	Outstanding placekicker in U.S. college football	
Gruber Prize in Cosmology	Peter and Patricia Gruber	Cosmology	Discoveries leading to fundamental advances in the field	
Gruber Prize in Genetics	Peter and Patricia Gruber	Genetics	Distinguished research contributions	
Gruber Prize for Justice	Peter and Patricia Gruber	Justice	Contributions that have advanced the cause of justice as delivered through the legal system	
Gruber Prize in Neuroscience	Peter and Patricia Gruber	Neuroscience	Distinguished research contributions	
Gruber Prize for Women's Rights	Peter and Patricia Gruber	Women's rights	Contributions toward furthering the rights of women and girls	
Eileen Guppy Award	Eileen Guppy	Mineralogy	Contributions to the disciplines of mineralogy and earth sciences	
Ray Guy Award	Ray Guy	American football	Outstanding punter in U.S. college football	
Gusi Peace Prize	Captain Gemeniano Javier Gusi	Peace	Gusi Peace Prize, named after Captain Gemeniano Javier Gusi (a World War II Guerilla Warrior) is signed by President of the Philippines and is given to recognize individuals and organizations who contribute to global peace and progress through a wide variety of fields.	
Guy Medal	William Guy	Statistics	Innovative contributions to the theory or application of statistics.	
Haren Gandhi Research and Innovation Award	Haren Gandhi	Automotive engineering	Contributions to significant technical achievements in their field of study	

== H ==
Award	Named after	Field	Achievement	Source
Otto Hahn Peace Medal	Otto Hahn	Peace and tolerance	Outstanding services for peace, tolerance and international understanding	
Otto Hahn Medal	Otto Hahn	Science (in general)	Annually awarded to a maximum of 30 junior scientists in recognition of outstanding scientific achievements	
Otto Hahn Prize	Otto Hahn	Science	Exceptional scientific achievements in chemistry and physics. The prize is the most significant honor of the German Physical Society and the German Chemical Society.	
Harmsworth Cup	Alfred Harmsworth	Motorboat racing		
E. H. Harriman Award	E. H. Harriman	Rail transport	Outstanding safety achievements by an American railroad company	
Harrison–Meldola Memorial Prizes	Edward Harrison and Raphael Meldola	Chemistry	Most meritorious and promising original investigations in chemistry by British chemist	
Hart Memorial Trophy	David Hart	Ice hockey	Most valuable player in the National Hockey League	
Harvey Award	Harvey Kurtzman	Comics	Outstanding achievement in 19 regular categories and four special categories	
Haskins Award	Fred Haskins	Golf	In honor of the most outstanding collegiate golfer in the United States	
Walter Hayes Trophy	Walter Hayes	Motorsport	Winner of the eponymous Formula Ford race	
Lew Hayman Trophy	Lew Hayman	Canadian football	Most outstanding Canadian player in the CFL East Division. This individual becomes one of the two finalists for the CFL's Most Outstanding Canadian Award.	
Heaviside Medal	Oliver Heaviside	Control Engineering	Exceptional contribution to the advancement of control engineering and technology	Institution of Engineering and Technology
Dannie Heineman Prize for Mathematical Physics	Dannie Heineman	.	.	
Hugh M. Hefner First Amendment Award	Hugh Hefner	Free expression	Significant contribution to protection and enhancement of U.S. First Amendment rights	
Charlene Heisler Prize	Charlene Heisler	Astronomy	Most outstanding PhD thesis in astronomy at an Australian University	
Heisman Trophy	John Heisman	American football	Outstanding U.S. college football player of the year	
Ted Hendricks Award	Ted Hendricks	American football	Outstanding defensive end in U.S. college football	
O. Henry Award	O. Henry	Literature	Short stories of exceptional merit written in English and published in the U.S. or Canada	
Lou Henson Award	Lou Henson	Basketball	Outstanding player at a mid-major school in NCAA Division I men's college basketball	
Hermann Trophy	Robert Hermann	Football (soccer)	Top men's and women's college soccer players in the U.S.	
Hessell-Tiltman Prize	Marjorie Hessell-Tiltman	.	.	
Max Hey Medal	Max Hey	Mineralogy	Early-career contributions to research in mineralogy	
Harlon Hill Trophy	Harlon Hill	American football	Most outstanding player in NCAA Division II college football	
Hillary Shield	Edmund Hillary	Rugby union	Challenge trophy between New Zealand and England	
Ho-Am Prize	Lee Byung-chul (pen name Ho-Am)	Science, engineering, medicine, arts and community service	Domestic/abroad ethnic Korean who have made outstanding contributions to the development of science and culture and enhancement of the welfare of mankind	
Dan Hodge Trophy	Danny Hodge	Wrestling	Most outstanding college wrestler in the U.S.	
Hopetoun Cup	John Hope, 7th Earl of Hopetoun	Rugby union	Challenge trophy between Australia and Scotland	
Hopman Cup	Harry Hopman	Tennis	World mixed-sex team championship	
Grace Murray Hopper Award	Grace Hopper	Computer science	Significant technical or service contribution by an individual under age 35	
Hopwood Award	Avery Hopwood			
Paul Hornung Award	Paul Hornung	American football	Most versatile player in NCAA Division I FBS college football	
Louisa Gross Horwitz Prize	Louisa Gross Horwitz			
Dick Howser Trophy	Dick Howser	Baseball	Most outstanding player in U.S. college baseball	
Fred Hoyle Medal and Prize	Fred Hoyle	Physics	Distinguished contributions to astrophysics, gravitational physics or cosmology	
M. King Hubbert Award	M. King Hubbert	Geophysics	Major science or engineering contribution to the ground water industry through research, technical papers, teaching, and practical applications	
Hughes Medal	David E. Hughes			
Hugo Award	Hugo Gernsback	Science fiction, fantasy	Outstanding works in 15 categories	
Humboldt Prize	Alexander von Humboldt			
Lamar Hunt U.S. Open Cup	Lamar Hunt	Football (soccer)	United States cup competition	
Hutch Award	Fred Hutchinson	Baseball	Most competitive player in Major League Baseball	

== I ==
Award	Named after	Field	Achievement	Source
Henry Iba Award	Henry Iba	Basketball	Coach of the year in NCAA Division I men's college basketball, as chosen by the United States Basketball Writers Association	
Barry Inglis Medal	Barry Inglis	Physics	For leadership, research and/or applications of measurement technique.	
IEEE Masaru Ibuka Consumer Electronics Award	Masaru Ibuka	Electronics	Outstanding contribution to consumer electronics	
Ina Nobuo Award	Nobuo Ina	Photography		
Juzo Itami Award	Juzo Itami	Various	Excellence in literary and visual expression	
Iverson Award	Kenneth E. Iverson	Computer science	Outstanding contributions to the APL programming language or to its user community	
Izumi Kyōka Prize for Literature	Kyōka Izumi	Literature		

== J ==
Award	Named after	Field	Achievement	Source
Michael Jackson Video Vanguard Award	Michael Jackson	Music video	Outstanding achievement to MTV culture and its history for musicians and music video directors.	
Eddie James Memorial Trophy	Eddie James	Canadian football	Leading rusher in the CFL West Division. Unlike other CFL divisional trophies, there is no equivalent for the East Division.	
Louis-Jeantet Prize for Medicine	Louis Jeantet	Medicine	Outstanding achievement in biomedical research in Europe	
Jefferson–Eppes Trophy	Thomas Jefferson and Francis W. Eppes VII	American football	Winner of the annual game between Florida State University and the University of Virginia	
Alex Jesaulenko Medal	Alex Jesaulenko	Australian rules football	Three different awards: Mark of the Year in the Australian Football League; Best player in the AFL Canberra Grand Final; Best player for "The Allies" team in the State of Origin series (defunct)	
William M. Jennings Trophy	William M. Jennings	Ice hockey	NHL goaltender(s) whose team has allowed the fewest goals in the regular season. Note that this was the original criterion for the Vezina Trophy, which is now awarded to the league's outstanding goaltender.	
Jewett Trophy	Christopher Jewett	Canadian football	Atlantic University Sport championship	
Samuel Johnson Prize	Samuel Johnson	Literature	Outstanding non-fiction book by a British writer	
Bob Jones Award	Bobby Jones	Golf	Recognition of distinguished sportsmanship in golf	
James Joule Medal and Prize	James Joule	Physics	Distinguished contributions to applied physics.	
Jackson-Gwilt Medal	Hannah Jackson née Gwilt	Astronomy	Outstanding invention, improvement, or development of astronomical or geophysical instrumentation or techniques	

== K ==
Award	Named after	Field	Achievement	Source
Kalai Prize	Ehud Kalai	Game theory and computer science	Outstanding papers	
Karlspreis	Charlemagne	Peace	Outstanding contribution to Western European integration	
Theodore von Karman Medal	Theodore von Kármán	Civil engineering	Distinguished achievement in engineering mechanics, as applied to civil engineering	
Patty Kazmaier Award	Patty Kazmaier-Sandt	Ice hockey	Outstanding player in NCAA Division I women's college hockey	
Gottfried-Keller-Preis	Gottfried Keller	Literature	Outstanding achievement in Swiss literature, in any of the country's languages	
Kennedy Center Honors	John F. Kennedy	Performing arts	Lifetime contribution to American culture	
J. Walter Kennedy Citizenship Award	J. Walter Kennedy	Basketball	"Outstanding service and dedication to the community" by an NBA player, coach, or trainer	
Graham Kennedy Award	Graham Kennedy	Australian television	"For Most Outstanding New Talent"	
Kikuchi Kan Prize	Kan Kikuchi	Japanese culture		
Kimura Ihei Award	Ihei Kimura	Photography		
Iven C. Kincheloe Award	Iven Carl Kincheloe, Jr.	Aviation	Outstanding professional accomplishment in the conduct of flight testing.	
Kirby Award	Jack Kirby	Comics	Outstanding achievement in comic books in 12 categories. Awarded 1985–87; replaced by Eisner Award and Harvey Award.	
Knuth Prize	Donald Knuth	Computer science	Outstanding foundational contributions, based on overall impact. Compare with the Gödel Prize, which honors outstanding individual papers.	
Kurt Koffka Medal	Kurt Koffka	Perception or Developmental psychology	Advancing the fields of perception or developmental psychology to an extraordinary extent.	
Stephen F. Kolzak Award	Stephen F. Kolzak	Entertainment	Outstanding work directed toward eliminating homophobia by an openly LGBT member of the entertainment or media community	
Kurchatov (Gold) Medal	Igor Kurchatov	Nuclear physics	Lifetime contributions to nuclear physics, nuclear energy, or nuclear engineering by a Soviet (communist era) or Russian (post-communist era). Known as the Kurchatov Medal in the Soviet era, and the Kurchatov Gold Medal today.	
Khwarizmi International Award	Muhammad ibn Musa al-Khwarizmi	Science & technology	Distinguished achievements in science & technology, international call for participation	

== L ==
Award	Named after	Field	Achievement	Source
Lamme Medal	Benjamin G. Lamme			
Lamoriello Trophy	Lou Lamoriello	Ice hockey	Hockey East men's postseason tournament championship trophy	
Landau Gold Medal	Lev Landau	Theoretical physics	Awarded for outstanding scientific work in the field of theoretical physics, including nuclear physics and elementary particles	
Lasker Award	Mary Woodward Lasker	Medicine	Major contributions to medical science, or distinguished public service on behalf of medicine	
European Latsis Prize	John Latsis			
Phillip Law Postdoctoral Award for the Physical Sciences	Phillip Law	Physical Sciences	The award is open to suitably qualified post-doctoral candidates in the area of the Physical Sciences, which includes Astronomy, Astrophysics, Chemistry, Mathematics, Physics, all branches of Engineering, and related sciences.	
Berthold Leibinger Innovationspreis	Berthold Leibinger			
Berthold Leibinger Zukunftspreis	Berthold Leibinger			
Gottfried Wilhelm Leibniz Prize	Gottfried Leibniz			
Lemelson–MIT Prize	Jerome H. Lemelson			
Coupe Suzanne Lenglen	Suzanne Lenglen	Tennis	French Open women's singles championship trophy	
Leontief Prize	Wassily Leontief			
Nancy Lieberman Award	Nancy Lieberman	Basketball	Outstanding point guard in U.S. women's college basketball	
Lincoln Prize	Abraham Lincoln	Literature	Finest scholarly work in English on Abraham Lincoln or the American Civil War	
Astrid Lindgren Memorial Award	Astrid Lindgren			
Ted Lindsay Award	Ted Lindsay	Ice hockey	Most outstanding player in the regular season of the National Hockey League, as chosen by the NHL Players Association. Known as the Lester B. Pearson Award from its inception in 1972 through 2009.	
John Lingenfelter Memorial Trophy	John Lingenfelter	Car racing	Winner of the annual Supercar/Superfour Challenge	
Linnean Medal	Carl Linnaeus	Biology	Awarded annually to two people for services to biology	
Sir Thomas Lipton Trophy	Thomas Lipton	Football		
Copa Lipton	Thomas Lipton	Football		
Lipton Challenge Cup	Thomas Lipton	Football		
Logie Award	John Logie Baird	Australian television		
Lombardi Award	Vince Lombardi	American football	Outstanding lineman or linebacker in U.S. college football	
Vince Lombardi Trophy	Vince Lombardi	American football	Super Bowl winner's trophy	
Lomonosov Gold Medal	Mikhail Lomonosov			
George London Award	George London	Operatic singing		
Håkan Loob Trophy	Håkan Loob	Ice hockey	Leading goal scorer in Swedish Hockey League	
Lorentz Medal	Hendrik Lorentz			
Lott Trophy	Ronnie Lott	American football	Outstanding defensive player in U.S. college football, based on excellence both on and off the field	
George M. Low award	George M. Low			
Dr. Leopold Lucas Prize	Leopold Lucas	Philosophy, history and theology	Outstanding scholarly contributions that have contributed to intercultural understanding and tolerance.	

== M ==
Award	Named after	Field	Achievement	Source
Moxon Medal	Dr Walter Moxon	Medical research	Distinguished work in clinical medical research (not restricted to British subjects).	Royal College of Physicians
James P. McCaffrey Trophy	James P. McCaffrey	Canadian football	Most outstanding defensive player in the CFL East Division. This individual becomes one of the two finalists for the CFL's Most Outstanding Defensive Player Award.	
Dick McCann Memorial Award	Dick McCann	Sports journalism	Awarded by the Pro Football Hall of Fame "for long and distinguished reporting on professional [American] football".	
Liam MacCarthy Cup	Liam MacCarthy	Hurling	All-Ireland Senior Hurling Championship trophy	
McClelland Trophy	William C. McClelland	Australian rules football	Australian Football League minor premiership trophy	
Mark H. McCormack Award	Mark McCormack	Golf	Leading of the Official World Golf Ranking for most weeks in a year	
Mark H. McCormack Medal	Mark McCormack	Golf	Leading player of the World Amateur Golf Ranking	
W. P. McGee Trophy	W. P. McGee	Basketball	U Sports (Canada) men's basketball championship trophy	
Mackay Trophy	Clarence Mackay	Aviation	"Most meritorious flight of the year" by one or more individuals, or an organization, within the United States Air Force	
John Mackey Award	John Mackey	American football	Outstanding tight end in U.S. college football	
MacTavish Cup	Duncan MacTavish	Sports coaching		
Ramon Magsaysay Award	Ramon Magsaysay	Six different fields – see award article	Outstanding achievement by an Asian	
Sam Maguire Cup	Sam Maguire	Gaelic football	All-Ireland Senior Football Championship trophy	
Majorana Prize	Ettore Majorana	Mathematics or Physics	Outstanding contributions to theoretical and mathematical physics	
Mandela Challenge Plate	Nelson Mandela	Rugby union	Challenge trophy between South Africa and Australia	
Manning Award	Archie Manning and his sons Peyton and Eli	American football	Outstanding quarterback in U.S. college football	
Marconi Prize	Guglielmo Marconi	Communications	Annual award for advancements in the field	
Lou Marsh Trophy	Lou Marsh	Sports	Canadian athlete of the year	
Joe Marston Medal	Joe Marston	Football (soccer)	Outstanding player in the Australasian A-League Grand Final	
Dr. Beattie Martin Trophy	Beattie Martin	Canadian football	Most outstanding Canadian player in the CFL West Division. This individual becomes one of the two finalists for the CFL's Most Outstanding Canadian Award.	
Edgar Martínez Award	Edgar Martínez	Baseball	Outstanding designated hitter in the American League	
Bill Masterton Memorial Trophy	Bill Masterton	Ice hockey	National Hockey League player who best exemplifies the qualities of perseverance, sportsmanship, and dedication to the sport	
Matteucci Medal	Carlo Matteucci	Physics	Fundamental contributions	
Matthew Isakowitz Fellowship	Matthew Isakowitz	Aerospace	Promising graduate or undergraduate in commercial space from the United States	
Leigh Matthews Trophy	Leigh Matthews	Australian rules football	Most valuable player in the Australian Football League, as chosen by the AFL Players Association	
Somerset Maugham Award	W. Somerset Maugham	Literature	Best British writer or writers, under age 35, of a book published in the past year	
Meads Cup	Colin Meads	Rugby union	Champion of New Zealand's second-level Heartland Championship	
Mal Meninga Medal	Mal Meninga	Rugby league football	Player of the year for the Canberra Raiders	
Dally M Medal	Dally Messenger	Rugby league football	Best and fairest player in the National Rugby League's Grand Final	
Mark Messier Leadership Award	Mark Messier	Ice hockey	Outstanding leadership, on and off ice, by an NHL player	
Conrad-Ferdinand-Meyer-Preis	Conrad Ferdinand Meyer	Literature	Outstanding achievement in Swiss German literature	
Yukio Mishima Prize	Yukio Mishima	Literature		
Old Tom Morris Award	Old Tom Morris	Golf	Individual who "through a continuing lifetime commitment to the game of golf has helped to mold the welfare of the game in a manner and style exemplified by Old Tom Morris."	
Nevill Mott Medal and Prize	Nevill Mott	Physics	Distinguished research in condensed matter or materials physics.	
Mountbatten Medal	Louis Mountbatten	Electronics	Contributions to electronics or information technology and their application.	Institution of Engineering and Technology
The Four Musketeers (Jean Borotra, Jacques Brugnon, Henri Cochet, René Lacoste)	Tennis	French Open men's singles championship trophy		
Mussabini Medal	Sam Mussabini	Sports coaching		

== N ==
Award	Named after	Field	Achievement	Source
Frances Pomeroy Naismith Award	Frances Pomeroy Naismith (daughter-in law of James Naismith)	Basketball	Most outstanding NCAA Division I senior (final-year) player of the year no taller than 6 feet (1.83 m) for men and 5 ft 8 in (1.73 m) for women. Award defunct since 2014.	
Norman W. V. Hayes Medal	Norman Hayes	Engineering		
Naismith College Coach of the Year	James Naismith	Basketball	Most outstanding men's and women's NCAA Division I head coaches of the year	
Naismith College Player of the Year	James Naismith	Basketball	Most outstanding men's and women's NCAA Division I players of the year	
Naismith Outstanding Contribution to Basketball	James Naismith	Basketball	Awarded to one man and one woman annually for lifetime service to basketball in any capacity	
Naismith Prep Player of the Year	James Naismith	Basketball	Most outstanding boys' and girls' U.S. high school players of the year	
Naismith Trophy	James Naismith	Basketball	FIBA Basketball World Cup (men's) winner's trophy	
Naoki Prize	Sanjugo Naoki	Literature		
Byron Nelson Award	Byron Nelson	Golf	Lowest scoring average on the PGA Tour. Awarded by the Tour itself, with a 50-round minimum for the season. Compare with the Vardon Trophy, awarded by the PGA of America.	
Byron Nelson Award	Byron Nelson	Golf	Lowest scoring average on PGA Tour Champions	
Neumann Medal	Barbara Neumann	Mineralogy	'scientific excellence in mineralogy and its applications/	
Noether Lecture Prize	Emmy Noether	Mathematics	Honors women who have "made fundamental and sustained contributions to the mathematical sciences"	
Nevanlinna Prize	Rolf Nevanlinna	Information sciences	Outstanding contributions in mathematical aspects of information sciences	
Roy G. Neville Prize	Roy Neville	Chemistry/literature	Outstanding biography in field of chemistry or molecular science	
Newbery Medal	John Newbery	Literature	Most distinguished contribution to American literature for children	
Sir Roger Newdigate's Prize	Roger Newdigate	Literature	Best composition in English verse by an undergraduate who has been admitted to the University of Oxford within the previous four years	
Pete Newell Big Man Award	Pete Newell	Basketball	Most outstanding low-post player in NCAA Division I men's college basketball	
Institute of Physics Isaac Newton Medal	Isaac Newton	Physics	Outstanding contributions to physics by any physicist, regardless of subject area, background or nationality	
Jack Nicklaus Trophy	Jack Nicklaus	Golf	Player of the year on PGA Tour Champions, as determined by tour players	
Jeff Nicklin Memorial Trophy	Jeff Nicklin	Canadian football	Most outstanding player in the CFL West Division. This individual becomes one of the two finalists for the CFL's Most Outstanding Player Award.	
Nierenberg Prize for Science in the Public Interest	William Nierenberg	Science	Outstanding promotion of science in the public interest	
Nob Yoshigahara Puzzle Design Competition	Nob Yoshigahara	Engineering	Design of mechanical puzzles	
Nobel Memorial Prize in Economic Sciences	Alfred Nobel	Economics	Outstanding contribution	
Nobel Prize in Chemistry	Alfred Nobel	Chemistry	Outstanding contribution	
Nobel Prize in Literature	Alfred Nobel	Literature	Outstanding contribution	
Nobel Peace Prize	Alfred Nobel	Peace	Outstanding contribution in furthering peace between nations	
Nobel Prize in Physics	Alfred Nobel	Physics	Outstanding contribution	
Nobel Prize in Physiology or Medicine	Alfred Nobel	Physiology or medicine	Outstanding contribution	
Hideyo Noguchi Africa Prize	Hideyo Noguchi	Medicine		
Gerrit Noordzij Prize	Gerrit Noordzij	Typography	Extraordinary contributions in type design, typography and type education	
James Norris Memorial Trophy	James E. Norris	Ice hockey	NHL "defense player who demonstrates throughout the season the greatest all-round ability in the position"	
Ivor Novello Awards	Ivor Novello	Music	Excellence in British songwriting and composing	

== O ==
Award	Named after	Field	Achievement	Source
Davey O'Brien Award	Davey O'Brien	American football	Outstanding quarterback in U.S. college football	
Larry O'Brien Championship Trophy	Lawrence "Larry" O'Brien	Basketball	NBA championship trophy	
Lawrence O'Brien Award	Lawrence O'Brien	Politics	Outstanding service to the U.S. Democratic Party and its candidates	
Kenzaburō Ōe Prize	Kenzaburō Ōe	Literature		
Ōfuji Noburō Award	Noburō Ōfuji	Animation		
Lute Olson Award	Lute Olson	Basketball	Outstanding player in NCAA Division I men's college basketball who has played for more than one season at his current school	
Laurence Olivier Award	Laurence Olivier	Theatre	Excellence in acting in London West End shows	
Buck O'Neil Lifetime Achievement Award	Buck O'Neil	Baseball	Awarded by the U.S. Baseball Hall of Fame for positive contributions to baseball in society	
Tip O'Neill Award	James "Tip" O'Neill	Baseball	A Canadian "judged to have excelled in individual achievement and team contribution while adhering to the highest ideals of the game of baseball"	
Ortega y Gasset Awards	José Ortega y Gasset	Journalism	Outstanding accomplishment in Spanish-language journalism	
Orteig Prize	Raymond Orteig	Aviation	First aviator of the Allies of World War I to fly nonstop between New York and Paris in either direction. Awarded to Charles Lindbergh for his 1927 solo transatlantic crossing.	
Otaka Prize	Hisatada Otaka	Composition		
Outland Trophy	John H. Outland	American football	Outstanding interior lineman, on either offense or defense, in U.S. college football	

== P ==
Award	Named after	Field	Achievement	Source
Arnold Palmer Award	Arnold Palmer	Golf	Leading money winner on PGA Tour Champions	
Jackie Parker Trophy	Jackie Parker	Canadian football	Most outstanding rookie (first-year player) in the CFL West Division. This individual becomes one of the two finalists for the CFL's Most Outstanding Rookie Award.	
Tom Pate Memorial Award	Tom Pate	Canadian football	Outstanding sportsmanship, team play, and community service by a Canadian Football League player	
Lester Patrick Trophy	Lester Patrick	Ice hockey	Outstanding contribution to the sport in the United States	
Paul Bartlett Ré Peace Prize	Paul Ré	Peace	Paul Bartlett Ré Peace Prize, named after Paul Ré (an American artist, writer, poet and peace advocate) is given to a student, faculty, staff person, retiree, volunteer or alumnus of University of New Mexico who has demonstrated notable achievements in promoting world peace and understanding.	
Walter Payton Award	Walter Payton	American football	Offensive player of the year in NCAA Division I FCS football	
Walter Payton Man of the Year Award	Walter Payton	American football	Outstanding volunteer and charity work by an NFL player; awarded by the league. See also the "Whizzer" White NFL Man of the Year Award, given by the NFL Players Association.	
Walter Payton Trophy	Walter Payton	American football	Most athletic player in U.S. high school football	
Peabody Award	George Foster Peabody	Broadcasting	Excellence in radio, television, and internet broadcasting	
Lester B. Pearson Award	Lester B. Pearson	Ice hockey	Original name of the NHL trophy now known as the Ted Lindsay Award.	
Pearson Medal of Peace	Lester B. Pearson	Peace	Outstanding "contribution to international service" by a Canadian	
Pendray Aerospace Literature Award	George Edward Pendray	Aerospace	Outstanding contribution to literature on aeronautics and astronautics	
Kim Perrot Sportsmanship Award	Kim Perrot	Basketball	WNBA player who "exemplifies the ideals of sportsmanship on the court—ethical behavior, fair play and integrity"	
Antoinette Perry Awards for Excellence in Theatre (aka "Tony Awards")	Antoinette Perry	Theatre	Outstanding achievement in Broadway theatre, in 26 regular categories plus four special categories	
Pessoa Prize	Fernando Pessoa	Science, literature, arts	Distinguished accomplishment by a Portuguese national in any of the named fields	
Dadasaheb Phalke Award	Dadasaheb Phalke	Cinema	Lifetime accomplishment in Indian cinema	
Pichichi Trophy	Pichichi	Football (soccer)	Leading goal scorers in La Liga and Segunda División (Spain). Compare with the Zarra Trophy, awarded to the Spanish nationals who lead both leagues in goals scored.	
IEEE Emanuel R. Piore Award	Emanuel R. Piore	Computer science	Outstanding contribution to (computer) information processing systems	
Max Planck Medal	Max Planck	Physics	Extraordinary achievement in theoretical physics	
Maurice Podoloff Trophy	Maurice Podoloff	Basketball	Trophy presented to the NBA Most Valuable Player of the regular season, as chosen by media members in the United States and Canada	
Edgar Allan Poe Awards (aka "Edgar Awards")	Edgar Allan Poe	Mystery fiction and non-fiction	Outstanding works in 18 categories	
Pomeranchuk Prize	Isaak Yakovlevich Pomeranchuk	Physics	Outstanding achievement in theoretical physics	
William and Mousie Powell Award	William Powell and Diana Lewis	Golf		
Fritz Pregl Prize	Fritz Pregl	Chemistry	Distinguished achievement by an Austrian national	
Priestley Medal	Joseph Priestley	Chemistry		
Prince of Wales Trophy	Edward, Prince of Wales	Ice hockey	NHL Eastern Conference championship trophy	
Pritzker Prize	Jay Pritzker	Architecture	"A living architect whose built work demonstrates a combination of those qualities of talent, vision and commitment, which has produced consistent and significant contributions to humanity and the built environment through the art of architecture."	
Pulitzer Prize	Joseph Pulitzer	Journalism, literature, music	Journalism: Excellence in 14 categories of newspaper journalism by a U.S.-based individual or publication Literature: Excellence by an American in 6 categories Music: Distinguished musical contribution by an American, first performed or recorded in the U.S. during that year	
Puskás Award	Ferenc Puskás	Football (soccer)	Given by FIFA to the scorer of the best goal each calendar year.	

== R ==
Award	Named after	Field	Achievement	Source
SASTRA Ramanujan Prize	Srinivasa Ramanujan	Mathematics	Outstanding work in Ramanujan's fields of interest by a mathematician no older than 32 (Ramanujan's age at death)	
Barbara Ramsden Award	Barbara Ramsden	Literature	To an author and editor in recognition of the joint effort to produce a quality fiction or non-fiction book	
Grand Prix C. F. Ramuz	Charles Ferdinand Ramuz	Literature	Lifetime achievement in Swiss French literature	
Ranfurly Shield	Uchter Knox, 5th Earl of Ranfurly	Rugby union	New Zealand provincial challenge trophy	
Rawlings Gold Glove Award	George and Alfred Rawlings	Baseball	Outstanding fielders in the National and American Leagues	
Rayleigh Medal	Baron Rayleigh	Acoustics	Outstanding contributions to acoustics	
Rayleigh Medal	Baron Rayleigh	Physics	Distinguished research in theoretical, mathematical or computational physics	
Harry Fielding Reid Medal	Harry Fielding Reid	Seismology and Earthquake engineering	Outstanding contributions in seismology and earthquake engineering	
Hans-Reinhart-Ring	Hans Reinhart	Theatre	Outstanding achievement in Swiss theatre, in any of the country's languages	
Prix REP–Hirsch	Robert Esnault-Pelterie and André-Louis Hirsch (a sponsor for early astronautics in France)	Astronomy/astronautics	Given in recognition of the study of interplanetary travel and astronautics	
Copa del Rey	King of Spain (Note: When the Copa del Rey was established in 1916, the Spanish monarch was Alfonso XIII.)	Football (soccer)	Spanish cup competition	
Copa del Rey de Baloncesto	King of Spain (Note: The competition now known as the Copa del Rey de Baloncesto was established in 1933, but did not receive its current name until 1977. At that time, the Spanish monarch was Juan Carlos I.)	Basketball	Spanish ACB cup competition	
John Llewellyn Rhys Prize	John Llewellyn Rhys	Literature	Best work of literature, in any category, published in the United Kingdom and written by a Commonwealth author no older than 35	
Jerry Rice Award	Jerry Rice	American football	Outstanding freshman (first-year) player in NCAA Division I FCS college football	
Maurice "Rocket" Richard Trophy	Maurice Richard	Ice hockey	Leading goal scorer in the NHL regular season	
Tom Richards Trophy	Tom Richards	Rugby union	Winner of Test series between Australia and the British and Irish Lions	
Mike Richter Award	Mike Richter	Ice hockey	Outstanding goaltender in NCAA men's college hockey	
Jules Rimet Trophy	Jules Rimet	Football (soccer)	FIFA World Cup championship trophy from 1934 through 1970	
Dave Rimington Trophy	Dave Rimington	American football	Outstanding center in U.S. college football	
Oscar Robertson Trophy	Oscar Robertson	Basketball	Men's college basketball player of the year, as chosen by the United States Basketball Writers Association	
Eddie Robinson Award	Eddie Robinson	American football	Coach of the year in NCAA Division I FCS	
Stein Rokkan Prize for Comparative Social Science Research	Stein Rokkan	Social science	Substantial and original contribution in comparative social science research	
Helen Rollason Award	Helen Rollason	Sports	"Outstanding achievement in the face of adversity"	
Theodore Roosevelt Award	Theodore Roosevelt	Lifetime achievement	Outstanding life accomplishment, leading to a distinguished national (U.S.) reputation, by an individual who earned at least one varsity letter at an NCAA member school	
Bobbie Rosenfeld Award	Bobbie Rosenfeld	Sports	Canadian sportswoman of the year	
Art Ross Trophy	Art Ross	Ice hockey	Leading point scorer in the NHL	
Rössler Prize	Max Rössler	Science	Outstanding young professor at the ETH Zurich	
Vera Rubin Early Career Prize	Vera Rubin	Astronomy	Early career researcher who demonstrates excellence in scientific research in Dynamical Astronomy	
Rumelhart Prize	David Rumelhart	Cognitive science	Achievements best described by the award's full name: the David E. Rumelhart Prize for Contributions to the Theoretical Foundations of Human Cognition.	
Rumford Medal	Sir Benjamin Thompson, Count Rumford	Physics	"An outstandingly important recent discovery in the field of thermal or optical properties of matter made by a scientist working in Europe." Awarded by the Royal Society.	
Rumford Prize	Sir Benjamin Thompson, Count Rumford	Physics	Outstanding contributions to the fields of heat and light. Awarded by the American Academy of Arts and Sciences.	
Adolph Rupp Cup	Adolph Rupp	Basketball	NCAA Division I men's basketball coach "who best exemplifies excellence in his dedication to the game of basketball and to his student athletes"	
Adolph Rupp Trophy	Adolph Rupp	Basketball	College basketball player of the year as chosen by the Commonwealth Athletic Club of Kentucky	
Bill Russell NBA Finals Most Valuable Player Award	Bill Russell	Basketball	MVP of the NBA Finals	
Babe Ruth Award	Babe Ruth	Baseball	Most valuable player of the Major League Baseball postseason, as chosen by the Baseball Writers' Association of America (BBWAA). Before the 2007 season, the BBWAA gave the award to the most valuable player of the World Series.	
Babe Ruth Home Run Award	Babe Ruth	Baseball	Leading home run hitter in Major League Baseball	
Ryder Cup	Samuel Ryder	Golf	Challenge trophy contested by men's professional teams representing the US and Europe	

== S ==
Award	Named after	Field	Achievement	Source
Sakharov Prize	Andrei Sakharov	Human rights	Outstanding work in defense of human rights and freedom of thought	
Sakurai Prize	J. J. Sakurai	Theoretical particle physics		
M. A. Sargent Medal	M. A. Sargent	Engineering	Eminence in engineering	
Salimbeni Prize	Lorenzo and Jacopo Salimbeni			
David Sarnoff Award	David Sarnoff			
Eiji Sawamura Award	Eiji Sawamura	Baseball	Outstanding starting pitcher in Nippon Professional Baseball	
Sigi Schmid Coach of the Year Award	Sigi Schmid	Association football	Top coach in Major League Soccer in a given season	
Schneider Trophy	Jacques Schneider	Aviation		
Rolf Schock Prizes	Rolf Schock			
Walter Schottky Prize	Walter Schottky	Solid-state physics		
Ben Schwartzwalder Trophy	Ben Schwartzwalder	American football	Winner of the game between Syracuse University and West Virginia University, once held annually before the series ended due to conference realignment	
Glenn T. Seaborg Medal	Glenn T. Seaborg			
Segrave Trophy	Henry Segrave	Transportation	Any British national who accomplishes the most outstanding demonstration of the possibilities of transport by land, sea, air, or water.	
Frank J. Selke Trophy	Frank J. Selke	Ice hockey	Top defensive forward in the NHL	
Seve Trophy	Seve Ballesteros	Golf	Challenge trophy between men's professional teams representing Great Britain & Ireland and continental Europe	
Barry Sheene Medal	Barry Sheene	Auto racing		
Shaw Prize	邵逸夫 Run Run Shaw	Science	Annual awards for outstanding contributions in astronomy, life science, medicine and mathematical science.	
Claude E. Shannon Award	Claude Shannon	Information theory		
Francis P. Shepard Medal	Francis P. Shepard	Marine Geology	Excellence in marine geology	
Shewhart Medal	Walter A. Shewhart			
Shinmura Izuru Prize	Izuru Shinmura	Linguistics		
Matsutaro Shoriki Award	Matsutaro Shoriki	Baseball		
Sikorsky Prize	Igor Sikorsky	Aviation	First controlled flight of a human-powered helicopter; awarded to AeroVelo on 11 July 2013	
Johan Skytte Prize in Political Science	Johan Skytte			
Smit–Lowenfeld Prize	Hans Smit and Andreas Lowenfeld	Law	Author of outstanding article published on any aspect of international arbitration.	
Norm Smith Medal	Norm Smith	Australian rules football	Best player in the AFL Grand Final	
Conn Smythe Trophy	Conn Smythe	Ice hockey	Most valuable player of the Stanley Cup playoffs	
Stafford Smythe Memorial Trophy	Stafford Smythe	Ice hockey	Most valuable player of the Memorial Cup	
Solheim Cup	Karsten Solheim	Golf	Challenge trophy contested by women's professional teams representing the US and Europe	
Solzhenitsyn Prize	Alexander Solzhenitsyn	Literature about Russia		
Somorjai Award for Creative Research in Catalysis	Gábor A. Somorjai	Chemistry		
Sophia Awards	Sophia de Mello Breyner Andresen	Cinema of Portugal	Best Portuguese films	
Wole Soyinka Prize for Literature in Africa	Wole Soyinka			
Warren Spahn Award	Warren Spahn	Baseball	Top left-handed pitcher in Major League Baseball	
Elmer A. Sperry Award	Elmer A. Sperry	Transportation	Distinguished contributions to transportation	
J. G. Taylor Spink Award	J. G. Taylor Spink	Journalism	"Meritorious contributions to baseball writing"	
J. G. Taylor Spink Award	J. G. Taylor Spink	Baseball	Player of the year in Minor League Baseball (North America)	
Stampacchia Medal	Guido Stampacchia			
Stanhope essay prize	Stanhope Philip			
Stanley Cup	Frederick Stanley	Ice hockey	National Hockey League championship trophy	
Athletes in Action/Bart Starr Award	Bart Starr	American football	Outstanding character and leadership in the home, on the field and in the community by an NFL player	
Steinfeld Cup	Jake Steinfeld	Lacrosse	Major League Lacrosse championship trophy	
Leroy P. Steele Prize	Leroy P. Steele			
Isabelle Stevenson Award	Isabelle Stevenson	Theatre	Outstanding volunteer contributions by a member of the American theatrical community, whether in the theatre or not. Presented during the Tony Awards.	
Payne Stewart Award	Payne Stewart	Golf	PGA Tour "Man of the Year" award	
Stirling Prize	James Stirling			
Bram Stoker Award	Bram Stoker	Literature	"Superior achievement" in eight categories of horror fiction, plus an award for lifetime achievement in that genre	
Annis Stukus Trophy	Annis Stukus	Canadian football	Canadian Football League coach of the year	
Dick Suderman Trophy	Dick Suderman	Canadian football	Most valuable Canadian in the Grey Cup game	
Sudirman Cup	Dick Sudirman	Badminton	World mixed-sex team championship	
James E. Sullivan Award	James E. Sullivan	Sports	Most outstanding amateur athlete in the United States	
Pat Summitt Most Courageous Award	Pat Summitt	Basketball	Presented annually by the United States Basketball Writers Association to an individual associated with women's college basketball who has, according to the organization, "demonstrated extraordinary courage reflecting honor on the sport of amateur basketball."	
Harry Sunderland Trophy	Harry Sunderland			

== T ==
Award	Named after	Field	Achievement	Source
Tanabe Hisao Prize	Hisao Tanabe	Ethnomusicology		
Tanizaki Prize	Jun'ichirō Tanizaki	Literature		
Templeton Prize	John Templeton	Religion	"Exceptional contribution to affirming life's spiritual dimension, whether through insight, discovery, or practical works"	
Tezuka Award	Osamu Tezuka	Manga	Outstanding new artist in the story manga genre	
Tezuka Osamu Cultural Prize	Osamu Tezuka	Manga	Outstanding works or accomplishment in four categories	
Irving G. Thalberg Memorial Award	Irving Thalberg	Cinema	Awarded periodically as part of the Academy Awards to "creative producers, whose bodies of work reflect a consistently high quality of motion picture production."	
Thomas Cup	George Alan Thomas	Badminton	World championship for men's national teams	
JJ Thomson Medal	JJ Thomson	Electronics	Exceptional contribution to the advancement of electronics engineering and technology	Institution of Engineering and Technology
Timoshenko Medal	Stephen Timoshenko	Mechanical engineering	"Distinguished contributions to the field of applied mechanics"	
Wayman Tisdale Award	Wayman Tisdale	Basketball	Outstanding freshman player in NCAA Division I men's college basketball, as chosen by the United States Basketball Writers Association	
Tolman Award	Richard C. Tolman	Chemistry	Outstanding contributions to chemistry in Southern California	
Lance Todd Trophy	Lance Todd	Rugby league	Man of the match in the Challenge Cup final	
George M. Trautman Awards	George M. Trautman	Baseball	Player of the year in each individual North American minor league	
Turing Award	Alan Turing	Computer science	"Contributions of a technical nature... of lasting and major technical importance to the computer field"	
Twyman–Stokes Teammate of the Year Award	Jack Twyman and Maurice Stokes	Basketball	The "ideal teammate" in the NBA, as determined each season by the league's players	
J. B. Tyrrell Historical Medal	Joseph Tyrrell	History	"Outstanding work in the history of Canada"	

== U–V ==
Award	Named after	Field	Achievement	Source
Uber Cup	Betty Uber	Badminton	World championship for women's national teams	
UNESCO/Guillermo Cano World Press Freedom Prize	Guillermo Cano Isaza	Press freedom	Honoured for his fight for press freedom in Colombia	
Johnny Unitas Golden Arm Award	Johnny Unitas	American football	Outstanding quarterback in U.S. college football who has spent at least four seasons in college (including a redshirt season)	
Tchicaya U Tam'si Prize for African Poetry	Tchicaya U Tam'si	Poetry		
George Van Biesbroeck Prize	George Van Biesbroeck	Astronomy	"Long-term extraordinary or unselfish service to astronomy"	
James A. Van Fleet Award	James A. Van Fleet	International relations	"Outstanding contributions to the promotion of U.S.-Korea relations" by either an American or South Korean	
Vanderbilt Cup	William Kissam Vanderbilt II	Auto racing	Original cup awarded to winners of the Vanderbilt Cup races (1904–1968 intermittently). Replica was awarded to U.S. 500 winners (1996–1999), then later to CART/Champ Car champions (2000–2007).	
Vanier Cup	Georges Vanier	Canadian football	U Sports football championship trophy	
Vardon Trophy	Harry Vardon	Golf	Lowest scoring average on the PGA Tour. Awarded by the PGA of America; requires a minimum of 60 rounds in the season. Compare with the Byron Nelson Award, given by the Tour itself for the same accomplishment but with a 50-round minimum.	
Harry Vardon Trophy	Harry Vardon	Golf	Winner of the Race to Dubai (historically the Order of Merit) as money leader on the European Tour.	
Vare Trophy	Glenna Collett Vare	Golf	Lowest scoring average on the LPGA Tour	
José Vasconcelos World Award of Education	José Vasconcelos	Education	Acknowledgment for exceptional teaching, which is the underlying basis of our present civilization	
Oswald Veblen Prize in Geometry	Oswald Veblen	Mathematics	Notable research in geometry or topology	
Vezina Trophy	Georges Vézina	Ice hockey	NHL goaltender "adjudged to be the best at this position"	
Prix Jean Vigo	Jean Vigo	Cinema	Independent spirit and excellence by a young French director	
Volta Prize	Alessandro Volta	Science	Outstanding applications of electricity in industry, chemistry, mechanics and practical medicine.	
John von Neumann Lecture Prize	John von Neumann	Applied mathematics	"Outstanding and distinguished contributions to the field of applied mathematical sciences and for the effective communication of these ideas to the community"	
IEEE John von Neumann Medal	John von Neumann	Computer science	"Outstanding achievements in computer-related science and technology"	
John von Neumann Theory Prize	John von Neumann	Systems science	Fundamental and sustained contributions to theory in operations research and the management sciences	
John von Neumann Award	John von Neumann	Economics	Outstanding scholar in the exact social sciences, whose works have had substantial influence over a long period of time on the studies and intellectual activity of students	
Voss Literary Prize	Vivian Robert de Vaux Voss	Literature	Best novel by an Australian published in the previous year judged by the Australian University Heads of English	

== W ==
Award	Named after	Field	Achievement	Source
Wade Trophy	Margaret Wade	Basketball	Player of the year in Division I women's college basketball who has played in at least two college seasons, as chosen by the Women's Basketball Coaches Association	
Wainwright Prize	Alfred Wainwright	Books	Presented to a UK natural history book: from 2020 split into Prize for UK nature writing and Prize for writing on global conservation	
Wakker Prize	Henri-Louis Wakker	Architectural history	Presented to a Swiss commune for development and preservation of architectural heritage	
Selman A. Waksman Award in Microbiology	Selman Waksman	Microbiology		
Doak Walker Award	Doak Walker	American football	Outstanding running back in U.S. college football	
Walker Cup	George Herbert Walker	Golf	Challenge trophy contested by men's amateur teams representing the US and Great Britain & Ireland	
Walkley Award	William Walkley			
Perry Wallace Most Courageous Award	Perry Wallace	Basketball	Presented annually by the United States Basketball Writers Association to an individual associated with men's college basketball who has, according to the organization, "demonstrated extraordinary courage reflecting honor on the sport of amateur basketball."	
The Wally	Wally Parks	Auto racing		
Wally Lewis Medal	Wally Lewis	Rugby league football	State of Origin player of the series	
Wanamaker Trophy	Rodman Wanamaker	Golf	PGA Championship winner's trophy	
Warne–Muralidaran Trophy	Shane Warne and Muttiah Muralitharan (Note: Murali's last name has generally been romanized as "Muralitharan" since the start of his career. However, he prefers to romanize his name as "Muralidaran". When Cricket Australia commissioned the trophy, it asked Murali to clarify how his name should be spelled, and the trophy uses his preferred romanization.)	Cricket	Perpetual challenge trophy awarded to winner of Test series between Australia and Sri Lanka	
Johnny Warren Medal	Johnny Warren	Football (soccer)	Best player in the Australasian A-League, as determined by the league's players	
James Craig Watson Medal	James Craig Watson			
James Watt International Medal	James Watt			
Oswald Watt Gold Medal	Oswald Watt			
Wheatcroft Trophy	Tom Wheatcroft	Auto racing	Significant contributions to motorsport in the United Kingdom	
Hermann Weyl Prize	Hermann Weyl	Physics	Awarded every two years to recognize young scientists who have performed original work of significant scientific quality in the area of understanding physics through symmetries	
Whipple Award	Fred Whipple	Planetary science	outstanding contributions in the field of planetary science	
"Whizzer" White NFL Man of the Year Award	Byron "Whizzer" White	American football	Outstanding community service by a National Football League player. Similar to the Walter Payton Man of the Year Award, but awarded by the players' union, the NFL Players Association, instead of the league.	
Heinrich Wieland Prize	Heinrich Wieland	Chemistry	Outstanding research on biologically active molecules and systems in the areas of chemistry, biochemistry and physiology.	
Norbert Wiener Award for Social and Professional Responsibility	Norbert Wiener			
Norbert Wiener Prize in Applied Mathematics	Norbert Wiener	Mathematics		
Wigner Medal	Eugene Wigner			
Prix Daniel Wildenstein	Daniel Wildenstein	Flat racing	Winner of the eponymous horse race	
Prince William Cup	Prince William, Duke of Cambridge	Rugby union	Challenge trophy between Wales and South Africa	
Ted Williams Award	Ted Williams	Baseball	Most valuable player of the Major League Baseball All-Star Game	
Wolf Prize	Ricardo Wolf	Agriculture, chemistry, mathematics, medicine, physics, and arts	Outstanding achievement in each of the named fields	
Wollaston Medal	William Hyde Wollaston	Geology	Outstanding achievement in geology	
Sir Martin Wood Prize	Martin Wood	Physics	Awarded annually to a scientist, younger than 45, who has achieved remarkable results in condensed matter science at a university or research institute in Japan. Condensed matter science includes condensed matter physics, inorganic-organic chemistry, material science and surface-interface physics.	
John R. Wooden Award	John Wooden	Basketball	Player of the Year Awards: Players of the year in NCAA Division I men's and women's college basketball High School Player of the Year Awards: Players of the year in each of the five subsections of the California Interscholastic Federation (CIF) Southern Section, plus the CIF Los Angeles Section; Legends of Coaching Award: Lifetime achievement by a men's or women's college coach	
George Woolf Memorial Jockey Award	George Woolf	Horse racing	Awarded to a Thoroughbred jockey in the U.S. or Canada who exhibits the highest standards of professional and personal conduct on and off the track	
Wright Brothers Medal	Wright Brothers (Orville and Wilbur)	Aerospace engineering	Outstanding contribution	
Wuerffel Trophy	Danny Wuerffel	American football	College football player "who best combines exemplary community service with athletic and academic achievement"	

== Y ==
Award	Named after	Field	Achievement	Source
Yashin Award	Lev Yashin	Football (soccer)	Outstanding goalkeeper of the FIFA World Cup	
Yates Cup	H. B. Yates	Canadian football	Ontario University Athletics championship	
Yentsch–Schindler Award	Clarice Yentsch and David Schindler	Oceanography and Limnology	In honor of early career scientists	ASLO website
Cy Young Award	Cy Young	Baseball	Most outstanding pitcher in both the National and American Leagues	
Kay Yow Award	Kay Yow	Basketball	Outstanding character, on and off the court, by a Division I women's college basketball coach	

== Z ==
Award	Named after	Field	Achievement	Source
Ricardo Zamora Trophy	Ricardo Zamora	Football (soccer)	Goalkeepers with the best "goals-to-games" ratio in both La Liga and the Segunda División (Spain)	
Zarra Trophy	Zarra	Football (soccer)	Spanish national with the most goals scored in both La Liga and the Segunda División (Spain). Compare with the Pichichi Trophy, for the same accomplishment but open to players of all nationalities.	
Zener Prize	Clarence Zener	Materials science, physics, and materials physics	Outstanding and distinguished contributions in materials science, physics, or materials physics	

== See also ==
- Lists of awards
- List of eponyms
- List of awards named after governors-general of Canada
