= Lord Rose =

Lord Rose may refer to:

- Stuart Rose, Baron Rose of Monewden, British businessman, Conservative peer
- Christopher Rose (judge) (Lord Justice Rose), British judge
