= Gruber Prize for Women's Rights =

- Awarded for: Advancing the rights of women and girls around the world
- Presented by: Peter and Patricia Gruber Foundation
- Reward: US$500,000
- First award: 2003
- Final award: 2011
- Website: gruber.yale.edu

The Gruber Prize for Women's Rights, established in 2003, was one of five international prizes worth US$500,000 awarded by The Peter and Patricia Gruber Foundation, an American non-profit organization.

The Peter and Patricia Gruber Foundation Women's Rights Prize was presented to an individual or group that has made significant contributions, often at great personal or professional risk, to furthering the rights of women and girls in any area and to advancing public awareness of the need for gender equality to achieve a just world. Recipients were selected by a distinguished panel of international women's rights experts/activists from nominations that are received from around the world.

The Foundation honored and encouraged educational excellence, social justice and scientific achievements that better the human condition.

In 2011, the Prize for Women's Rights was discontinued.

== Recipients ==
2003

- Navanethem Pillay: South African judge, previously a judge of the International Criminal Court, and since 2008, the UN High Commissioner for Human Rights.
- Pro-Femmes Twese Hamwe: organization in Rwanda

2004

- Sakena Yacoobi: founder, Afghan Institute of Learning
- the Afghan Institute of Learning

2005

- Shan Women's Action Network
- Women's League of Burma

2006

- Unión Nacional de Mujeres Guatemaltecas: women's organization in Guatemala
- Julie Su for Sweatshop Watch: organization in the U.S. state of California
- Cecilia Medina Quiroga: Chilean judge, currently serving on the Inter-American Court of Human Rights

2007

- Pinar Ilkkaracan of Istanbul, Turkey, and two organizations she helped establish: Women for Women's Human Rights – New Ways (WWHR) and the Coalition for Sexual and Bodily Rights in Muslim Societies (CSBR)

2008

- Yanar Mohammed, co-founder of Organization of Women's Freedom in Iraq, has become the focal point for women's rights activism in Iraq
- Sapana Pradhan Malla, a leader in securing legal reforms protecting the fundamental reproductive and property rights of women in Nepal, is president of the Forum for Women, Law & Development
- Nadera Shalhoub-Kevorkian, a leading feminist scholar, therapist and activist, has worked to end domestic violence against Palestinian women, particularly what have been referred to as honor killings; living in Israel, she has trained women activists in the West Bank and Gaza and established a hotline for reporting abuse

2009

- Leymah Gbowee, executive director of Women Peace and Security Network – Africa, who was instrumental in bringing about the end to civil war in Liberia and getting women's groups represented in negotiations and demilitarization efforts.
- Women's Legal Centre (WLC), a non-profit law center based in South Africa that seeks to achieve equality for women, particularly black women.

2010

- The Center for Reproductive Rights and CLADEM (Comité de América Latina y El Caribe para la Defensa de los Derechos de la Mujer), two organizations extending and defending the rights of women through litigation, law reform, and education, helping to advance women's sexual and reproductive rights.

2011

- AVEGA Agahozo was founded by survivors of the 1994 Rwandan genocide. The organisation seeks to improve the lives of fellow survivors (mostly widows) by improving healthcare access, housing opportunities, education, job-training, and advocacy.
