= Morecambe Bay Academy =

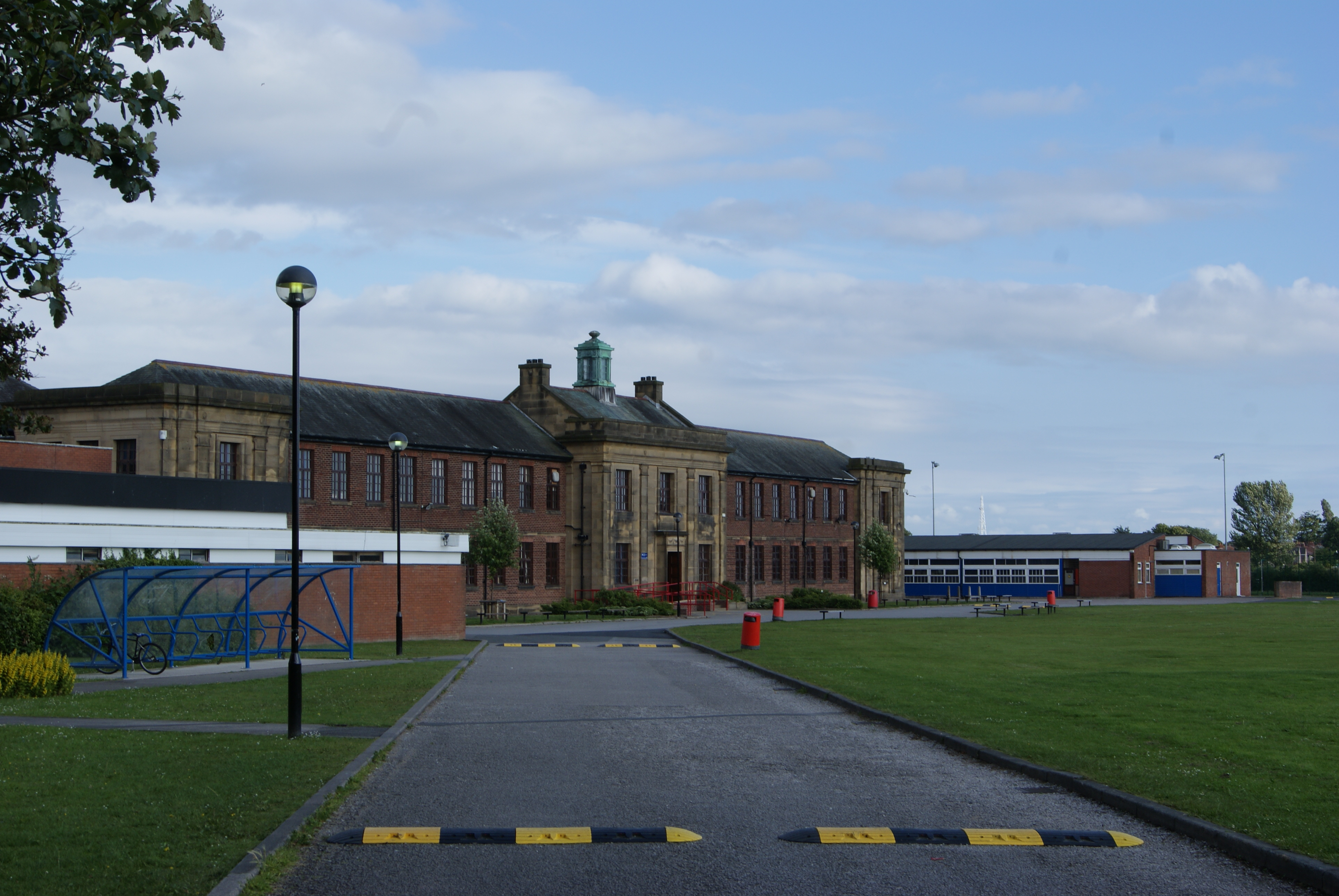
- School building (2011)

Location
- Dallam Avenue; Morecambe, Lancashire, LA4 5BG; England; 54°04′32″N 2°51′01″W

Information
- Type: Academy
- Established: 1919
- Local authority: Lancashire
- Department for Education URN: 147115 Tables
- Ofsted: Reports
- Principal: Jen Pardoe
- Gender: Coeducational
- Age: 11 to 18
- Enrolment: 1047
- Original Name: Morecambe Grammar School
- Previous Name: Morecambe Community High School
- Website: https://morecambebayacademy.co.uk/

Morecambe Bay Academy is a coeducational secondary school and sixth form located in Morecambe, Lancashire, England. It was founded as Morecambe Grammar School in 1919, moving to its current site on Dallam Avenue in 1938 on a former golf links course. In 2019, it was renamed to Morecambe Bay Academy during the process of becoming an academy.

== Admissions ==
There are approximately 1047 pupils at a school capacity of 1539. The school is situated just off the A589.

== History ==
=== Grammar school ===
The Ward family donated the land to Lancashire county council. The main school building is an art deco construction containing the administration area, school hall, dining facilities, and gym as well as the English, Maths and Science faculties, two Design Technology workshops and the RE department. In the 1930s there were around 300 boys and girls, 400 in 1938, 650 in 1942, 500 in 1953, and 850 in 1964. During the 1960s and 1970s two ROSLA blocks (which currently house Art, Drama, Music and PSE). In the late 1960s, the Department of Education and Science chose the school (along with the Rosebery School for Girls) to build an experimental sixth form centre.

=== Comprehensive ===
In September 1973 Morecambe Grammar School amalgamated with Euston Road Secondary Modern on the Dallam Avenue site to form Morecambe High School, growing considerably since the amalgamation. There were 1150 boys and girls with 240 in the sixth form.

In 1992, some unused land was sold to provide funding for construction of a Sports Hall. The Sports Hall was opened by former rugby union player Bill Beaumont. This facility has its own climbing wall and a large storage area for the equipment used for Outdoor Pursuits. The site extends to some 22 acres (8.9 ha) of playing fields including rugby, football and hockey pitches and an all weather surface.

In the mid-1990s the school expanded to its current size of 1500. To accommodate this growth 12 new classrooms were built to house the Humanities and Languages faculties. In addition there is a dedicated Sixth Form block including a common room, teaching areas and the Media Studies studios. In 2002 the Lawther Library was opened, which was funded in large part by a donation by Professor Patrick Lawther, a former student of the school. The 300 square metres study area includes a computer resource area and the Careers Library.

== Recent developments ==
In early 2009 the schools new multi use sports area opened giving it four new netball courts or five tennis courts. A new Technology Block opened in October 2007. New rooms cover areas such as manufacturing, CAD/CAM and textiles.

At the beginning of the 2006/7 school year, the school introduced a house system. This saw pupils in years 8–11 assigned to a House, one of Coniston, Helvellyn, Langdale, and Scafell mostly named after Lakeland hills. Each House consists of 10 forms. The school was awarded specialist status in 2007 for specialist status in maths and computing.

The schools main recent improvements are in ICT.

According to Ofsted Morecambe High School converted to Academy Status on 1 May 2019 and was renamed Morecambe Bay Academy. The School is now sponsored by Bay Learning Trust.

== Notable former pupils ==
- Geraldine Smith, Labour Member of Parliament for Morecambe and Lunesdale, 1997–2010
- Helen Pidd, northern editor of The Guardian

=== Morecambe Grammar School ===
- Jon Mitchell, ITV Calendar weatherman
- Sir Christopher Rose, judge and Chief Surveillance Commissioner since 2006
- Mary Hodson - represented GB in the 800m at the 1964 Tokyo Olympic Games
- John Richard Anthony Mitchell, physician and medical academic
