= Pınar İlkkaracan =

Turkish social reformer

Pınar İlkkaracan is a researcher trained both in psychotherapy and political science and a human rights activist. She is the co-founder of two NGOs, Women for Women’s Human Rights (WWHR) – NEW WAYS, a women’s NGO that led various successful legal reforms in Turkey towards gender equality in Turkey and the Coalition for Sexual and Bodily Rights (CSBR), a network of leading organizations and academics from 14 Muslim countries.

Pınar İlkkaracan is the editor of Women and Sexuality in Muslim Societies (translated into Arabic and Turkish) and Deconstructing Sexuality in the Middle East (2008), as well as many other articles. She was awarded the prestigious Gruber Prize for Women’s Rights of The Peter and Patricia Gruber Foundation in 2007 for her leadership for women’s rights at the global level.
