= Tony Mitchell (physician) =

British physician

John Richard Anthony Mitchell
- Born: October 24, 1928; Shipley, Yorkshire, United Kingdom
- Died: March 22, 1991 (aged 62); Cornwall, England, United Kingdom
- Spouse: Muriel Joyce Mitchell
- Children: 4
- Awards: Moxon Medal

Academic background
- Education: BSc, MB ChB, DPhil, MA, MD
- Alma mater: Oxford University
- Doctoral advisor: Gwyn Macfarlane

Academic work
- Discipline: Medicine
- Institutions: Nottingham medical school

John Richard Anthony Mitchell (24 October 1928 – 22 March 1991) was a prominent British physician and medical academic.

== Early life and education ==
Mitchell was born in the Yorkshire town of Shipley. His father, Richard Newton Mitchell, worked as a bank teller and his mother, Elizabeth (née Bell), was the daughter of dock foreman John William Bell.

He attended Morecambe Grammar School before studying physiology at the University of Manchester, where he graduated with a first-class degree with honours. He completed his clinical training at Manchester Royal Infirmary.

He served as a medical specialist in the Royal Army Medical Corps (RAMC) during his mandatory National Service from 1955 to 1957.

== Academic career ==
Mitchell worked as a registrar for Sir George Pickering at Oxford before obtaining an MRC research fellowship and completing a DPhil under the guidance of Gwyn Macfarlane.

When the Nottingham Medical School was founded in 1968, he was the first clinical professor. He was instrumental in the designing and commissioning of Nottingham's teaching hospital, the Queen's Medical Centre.

Mitchell made significant contributions to the fields of cardiovascular disease, thrombosis, epidemiology, clinical trials, and stroke research. In 1990, he was awarded the Moxon Medal by the Royal College of Physicians.

== Personal life ==
In 1954, Mitchell married Muriel Joyce, daughter of John Knight Gibbon, a marine engineer, and they had two sons and two daughters.

Mitchell retired early due to his scepticism over NHS reforms and changes to universities. He died suddenly and unexpectedly while on a camping trip to Cornwall in 1991.
