= Wolf Prize =

International award in arts and sciences

- Awarded for: Outstanding achievement in Agriculture, Chemistry, Mathematics, Medicine, Physics, and Arts
- Country: Israel
- Presented by: Wolf Foundation
- Reward: US$100,000
- First award: 1978; 48 years ago
- Website: wolffund.org.il

The Wolf Prize is an international award granted in Israel, that has been presented most years since 1978 to living scientists and artists for "achievements in the interest of mankind and friendly relations among people ... irrespective of nationality, race, colour, religion, sex or political views".

== History ==
The prize is awarded in Israel by the Wolf Foundation, founded by Ricardo Wolf, a German-born inventor and former Cuban ambassador to Israel. It is awarded in six fields: Agriculture, Chemistry, Mathematics, Medicine, and Physics, and an Arts prize that rotates between architecture, music, painting, and sculpture. Each prize consists of a diploma and US$100,000. The awards ceremony typically takes place at a session in the Knesset.

The Wolf Prizes in physics and chemistry are often considered the most prestigious awards in those fields after the Nobel Prize. The prize in physics has gained a reputation for identifying future winners of the Nobel Prize – from the 26 prizes awarded between 1978 and 2010, fourteen winners have gone on to win the Nobel Prize, five of those in the following year.

In medicine, the prize is probably the third most prestigious, after the Nobel Prize and the Lasker Award. Until the establishment of the Abel Prize, the Wolf Prize was probably the closest equivalent of a "Nobel Prize in Mathematics", since the more prestigious Fields Medal was only awarded every four years to mathematicians under forty years old. In agriculture, the prize has likewise been equated to a "Nobel Prize in Agriculture".

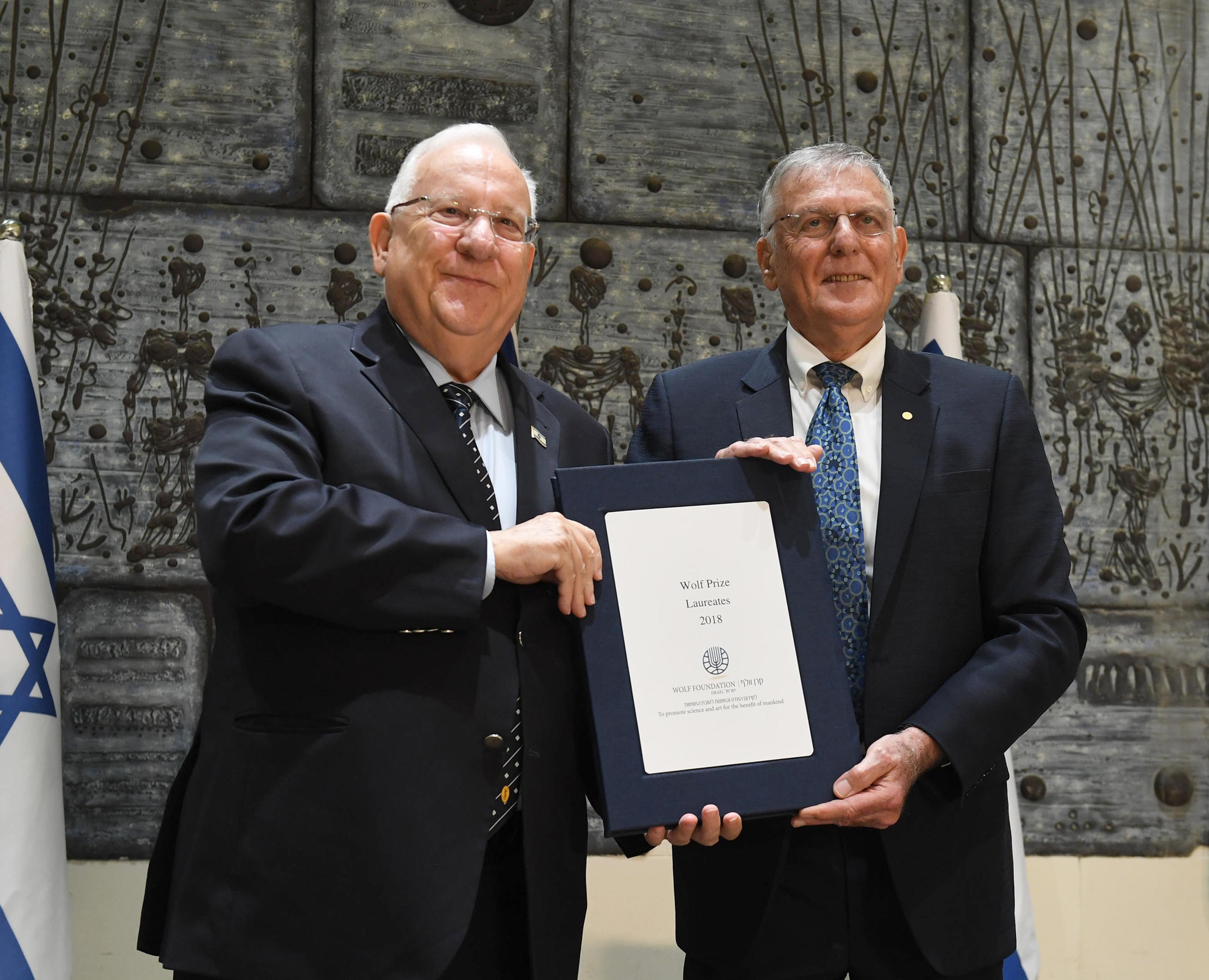
Reuven Rivlin and Dan Schetman, hosting the Wolf Prize in 2018. In the background is an Israeli artwork made of crushed basalt.

The most recent Wolf Prize was awarded in 2026 to:

- Agriculture – No award
- Chemistry – David Klenerman, Pascal Mayer and Shankar Balasubramanian "for developing impactful, low-cost, large-scale DNA sequencing methods for genomic medicine".
- Mathematics – David Kazhdan and Joseph Bernstein "for foundational work on representation theory, automorphic forms and algebraic geometry, and their role in creating geometric representation theory".
- Medicine – Charles S. Zuker "for revolutionizing our understanding of taste, the last of our senses to be elucidated"
- Physics – Jun Ye and Immanuel F. Bloch "For transformative, widely applicable advances in the control of ultracold atomic systems"
- Architecture – No Award

== Laureates per country ==
Below is a chart of all laureates per country (updated to 2023 laureates). Laureates with multiple citizenship are counted.

Country	Number of laureates
United States	189
United Kingdom	41
Israel	25
France	23
Hungary	16
Japan	15
Canada	15
Soviet Union / Russia	14
Germany	13
Italy	11
Austria	10
Belgium	8
Sweden	7
Switzerland	6
Spain	6
Netherlands	5
Argentina	5
Taiwan	4
Poland	3
India	2
Portugal	2
Denmark	2
Romania	1-2
China	1
Brazil	1
Palestine	1
Mexico	1
Egypt	1
South Africa	1
Jordan	1
Norway	1
Finland	1
Uruguay	1
Georgia	1
Cyprus	1

== See also ==
- Lists of art awards
- List of general science and technology awards
- List of mathematics awards
