= Moxon Medal =

Award made by the Royal College of Physicians

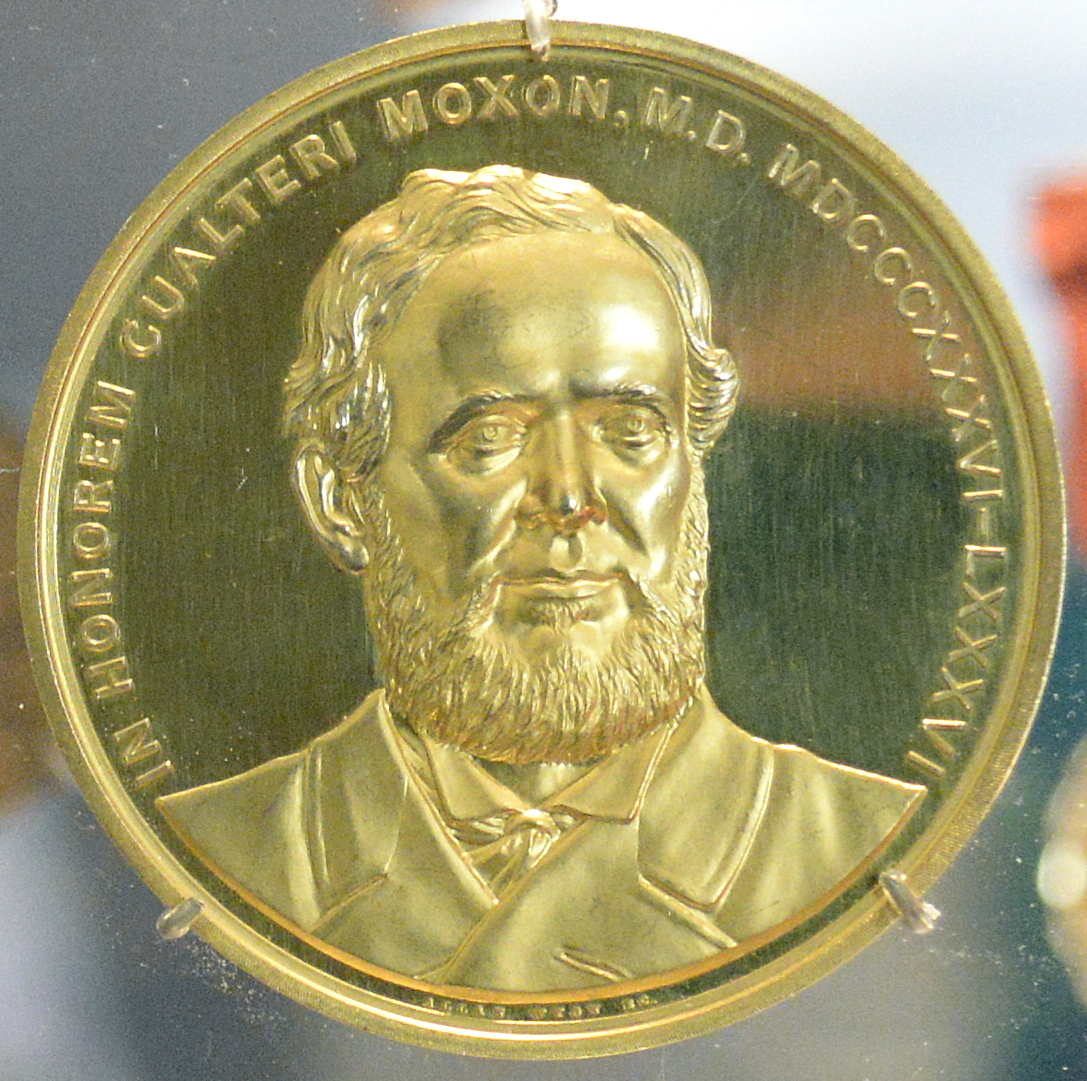
Walter Moxon medal 1945

The Moxon Medal was established in 1886. It is a triennial award made by the Royal College of Physicians to acknowledge a person who has produced distinguished observation and research in clinical medicine and is not restricted to British subjects.

The award is named after Dr Walter Moxon FRCP (1836–86), a distinguished doctor who practised, taught and researched medicine at Guy’s Hospital in London, England.

== Medallists ==
- 2022 Wei Shen Lim
- 2015 Tom Solomon
- 1990 John Richard Anthony Mitchell
- 1984 Arthur Norman Exton-Smith CBE
- 1978 Sir Francis Avery Jones CBE
- 1972 Cuthbert Leslie Cope
- 1970 Sir John McMichael
- 1966 John Maurice Hardman Campbell OBE; Joseph Harold Sheldon CBE
- 1957 Sir John Parkinson
- 1951 Sir Arthur William Mickle Ellis OBE
- 1948 Brigadier Sir Neil Hamilton Fairley
- 1945 Sir Alexander Fleming
- 1942 Sir Leonard Gregory Parsons
- 1939 Sir Arthur Frederick Hurst
- 1933 George Richards Minot
- 1930 Frederick Parkes Weber
- 1927 Sir Henry Head
- 1924 Sir Leonard Rogers
- 1921 Sir Thomas Clifford Allbutt
- 1918 Sir Frederick Walker Mott
- 1912 Sir David Ferrier
- 1909 Sir William Gowers
- 1906 Sir Jonathan Hutchinson
- 1897 Sir Samuel Wilks
- 1891 Sir Alfred Baring Garrod

== See also ==
- List of medicine awards
- Prizes named after people
