= Women for Women's Human Rights =

Non-governmental organization

Women for Women's Human Rights (WWHR) is an autonomous women's non-government organization (NGO) founded in 1993 in Turkey. WWHR works to fight for women's rights, to prevent violence against women and to provide information about women's rights in Turkey for research and general awareness.

== About ==
Women for Women's Human Rights (WWHR) works to promote women's rights in Turkey. They work on documenting and sharing information about the status of women's human rights in that country and promote programs to help empower women. They have published information about women's legal rights and status in Turkey. Information that WWHR has published has been used in research examining women's rights in Turkey. WWHR has also worked to fight violence against women and to define marital rape as a crime.

WWHR also collaborates with Women Living Under Muslim Laws (WLUML).

WWHR is based in Istanbul.

== History ==
Women for Women's Human Rights (WWHR) was founded in December 1993 in Turkey. Pinar Ilkkaracan is the founder of the group.

WWHR created an international campaign to amend the Civil Code, though it was not successful in getting Parliament to act on the laws pertaining to women. In 1996, WWHR was involved in a campaign to end legal discrimination against women in Turkey. Women did not have the right to choose where their families lived and did not have full custody of their own children. WWHR was part of an international campaign to obtain signatures on a petition to change the laws in Turkey.

WWHR organized a 2001 Conference on Women, Sexuality and Social Change in the Middle East and Mediterranean where participants from various countries confronted issues relating to women's rights.

In 2015, WWHR was one of 49 organizations to sign onto the Statement on the 48th Session of the UN Commission on Population and Development.
