= Ricardo Wolf =

German-emigre inventor, Cuban diplomat and Israeli philanthropist

- ריקרדו וולף
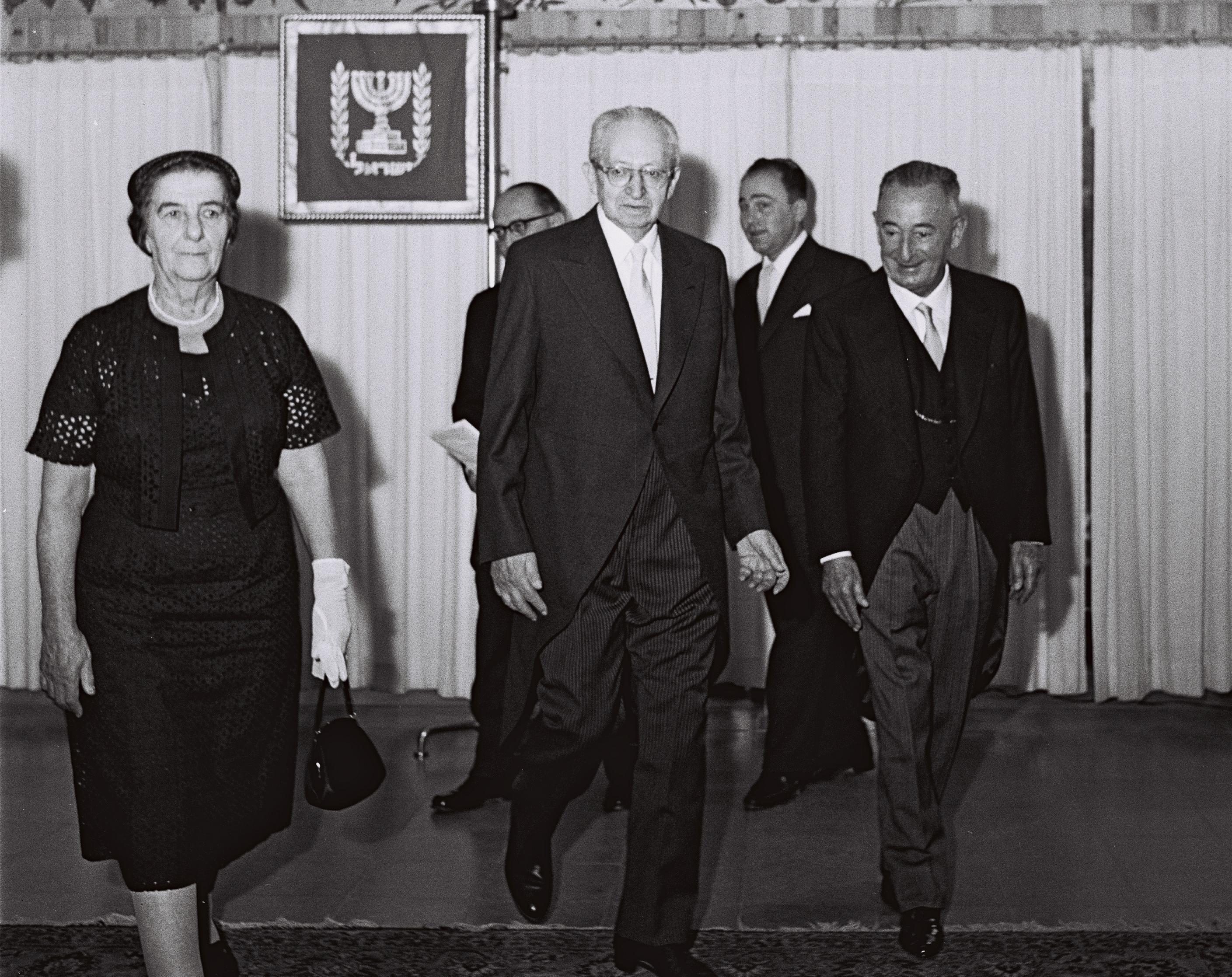
- Israel's foreign minister Golda Meir, President Yitzhak Ben-Zvi, and Cuban Ambassador to Israel Ricardo Subirana y Lobo (Ricardo Wolf), after presenting his credentials. Jerusalem, 1960.
- Born: 1887; Hanover, Germany
- Died: February 1981 (aged 93–94); Herzliya, Israel
- Occupations: Diplomat, inventor and philanthropist
- Known for: Cuban ambassador to Israel; Founder of the Wolf Foundation

Ricardo Wolf (Hebrew: ריקרדו וולף; originally Richard Wolf; also Ricardo Lobo Subirana, 1887–February 1981) was a German-born inventor, diplomat and philanthropist. After immigrating to Cuba, he served as its ambassador to Israel. In later life he and his wife remained in Israel, where they established the Wolf Foundation.

== Early years ==
Ricardo Wolf was born in Hanover, Germany, in 1887. He was one of 14 children born to Moritz Wolf, a pillar of that city's Jewish community.

Before the First World War, Wolf emigrated from Germany to Cuba, which became his second home. In 1924, he married Francisca Subirana, a tennis champion of the 1920s.

== Later years ==
For many years, Ricardo Wolf and his brother Sigfried Wolf worked to develop a process for recovering iron from smelting process residue. Ultimately successful, his invention was utilized in steel factories all over the world, bringing him considerable wealth.

Wolf lent both moral and financial support to Fidel Castro from the onset of the Cuban revolution. Beholden to Ricardo Wolf for his unswerving support, and cognizant of his personality and natural gifts as a diplomat, the Cuban leader offered him the position of Minister of Finance and, after Wolf declined, responded to Wolf's request and appointed him in 1961 Cuban Ambassador to Israel.

Wolf held this position until 1973, the year Cuba severed diplomatic ties with Israel. Upon relinquishing his diplomatic post, Wolf decided to remain in Israel, where he spent his final years.

== Establishment of Wolf Foundation ==
In 1975, Ricardo Wolf established the Wolf Foundation. The Wolf Prize has been awarded since 1978 by the Wolf Foundation. The Wolf Prize is awarded in six fields: Agriculture, Chemistry, Mathematics, Medicine, Physics, and an Arts prize that rotates annually between architecture, music, painting and sculpture. Each prize consists of a diploma and US$100,000.

In February 1981, Ricardo Wolf died at his home in Herzliya, Israel at the age of 94.
