= Walter Moxon =

Prominent figure in the field of medicine (1836–1886)

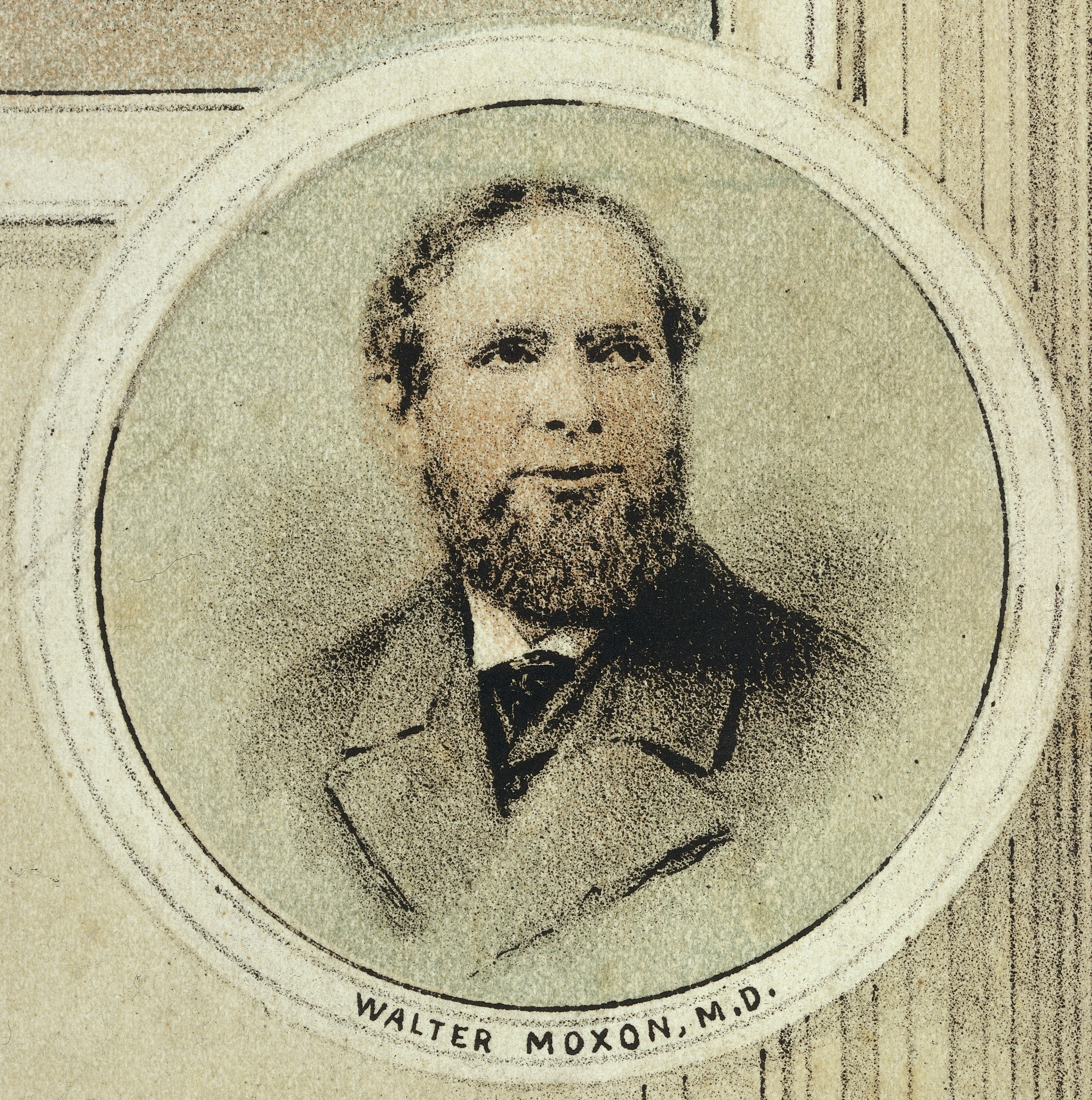
Walter Moxon, lithographic portrait

Walter Moxon (27 June 1836 – 21 July 1886) was an Irish physician in London.

== Early life ==
Walter Moxon was born in Midleton, Cork, one of nine children of William Milson Moxon, an inland revenue officer. He left school while still young, but studied in his own time.

== Career ==
Moxon initially worked in a merchant's office in London while simultaneously pursuing his studies, and passed the University of London's matriculation examination. He was able to enter Guy's Hospital as a medical student. Making good academic prowess at Guy's, he earned the position of demonstrator of anatomy before his graduation in 1859. This role marked the beginning of a career dedicated to the study and teaching of medicine.

In 1866, Moxon was elected assistant physician at Guy's Hospital. Over the years, he lectured on various subjects, including comparative anatomy, pathology, materia medica, and, starting in 1882, medicine. He also served as an editor for the second edition of Wilks's Lectures on Pathological Anatomy in 1875.

== Legacy and contributions ==
In 1881, Moxon delivered the prestigious Croonian Lecture at the Royal College of Physicians.

=== Moxon medal ===
In honour of Walter Moxon's contributions, the Moxon Medal was established at the Royal College of Physicians. This medal is awarded triennially, recognizing outstanding achievements in observation and research in clinical medicine.

Walter Moxon's life and work remain integral to the history of medicine, and his legacy endures through the recognition of his peers and the enduring impact of the Moxon Medal.

== Personal life ==
In 1861, Moxon married Selina Eckett, daughter of Robert Eckett (1797–1862) of the Wesleyan Association; they had one daughter. He died at Finsbury Circus, London, on 21 July 1886 and was buried on the western side of Highgate Cemetery.
