= Wolf Foundation =

Nonprofit organization in Herzliya, Israel

- Founded: 1975
- Founder: Ricardo Wolf
- Location: Israel
- Website: www.wolffund.org.il

The Wolf Foundation is a private not-for-profit organization in Israel established in 1975 by Ricardo Wolf, a German-born Jewish Cuban inventor and former Cuban ambassador to Israel.

== Ricardo Wolf ==
Ricardo Wolf, the founder of the Wolf Foundation, was a Jewish, German-born Cuban inventor, diplomat, philanthropist and former Cuban ambassador to Israel. For many years, he worked to develop a process for recovering iron from smelting process residue. Ultimately successful, his invention was utilized in steel factories all over the world, bringing him considerable wealth. He established the Wolf Foundation in 1975.

== History and structure ==
The Foundation began its activities in 1976, with an initial endowment fund of ten million dollar donated by the Wolf family. The major donors were Ricardo Wolf and his wife Francisca. Annual income from investments is used for prizes, scholarships and Foundation operating expenses.

It has a status of a private not-for-profit organization in Israel. It is tax-exempt. The objectives and prize administration details and procedures of the Foundation are grounded in the "Wolf Foundation Law-1975". State Comptroller of Israel oversees all Foundation’s activities. In accordance with the Law mentioned above, the Minister of Education and Culture acts as Chairman of the Council.

The Foundation Trustees, Council and Committee Members, Prize Juries, and Internal Auditor perform their duties on a voluntary basis.

== Aims ==
The aims of the Wolf Foundation are:

1. To award prizes to outstanding scientists and artists for achievements in the interest of mankind and friendly relations among peoples. The prize is awarded irrespective of nationality, race, color, religion, sex or political views.
2. To award scholarships to undergraduate and graduate students, and grants to scientists engaged in research at institutions of higher education in Israel.

== Wolf Prize ==
The Wolf Prize is awarded by the Wolf Foundation. The prize has been awarded annually since 1978. It is awarded in six fields: Agriculture, Chemistry, Mathematics, Medicine, Physics, and an Arts prize that rotates annually between architecture, music, painting and sculpture. In some fields such as physics, the prize is often considered the most prestigious award after the Nobel Prize.
