= Paul Ré =

American artist and writer (born 1950)

Paul Bartlett Ré
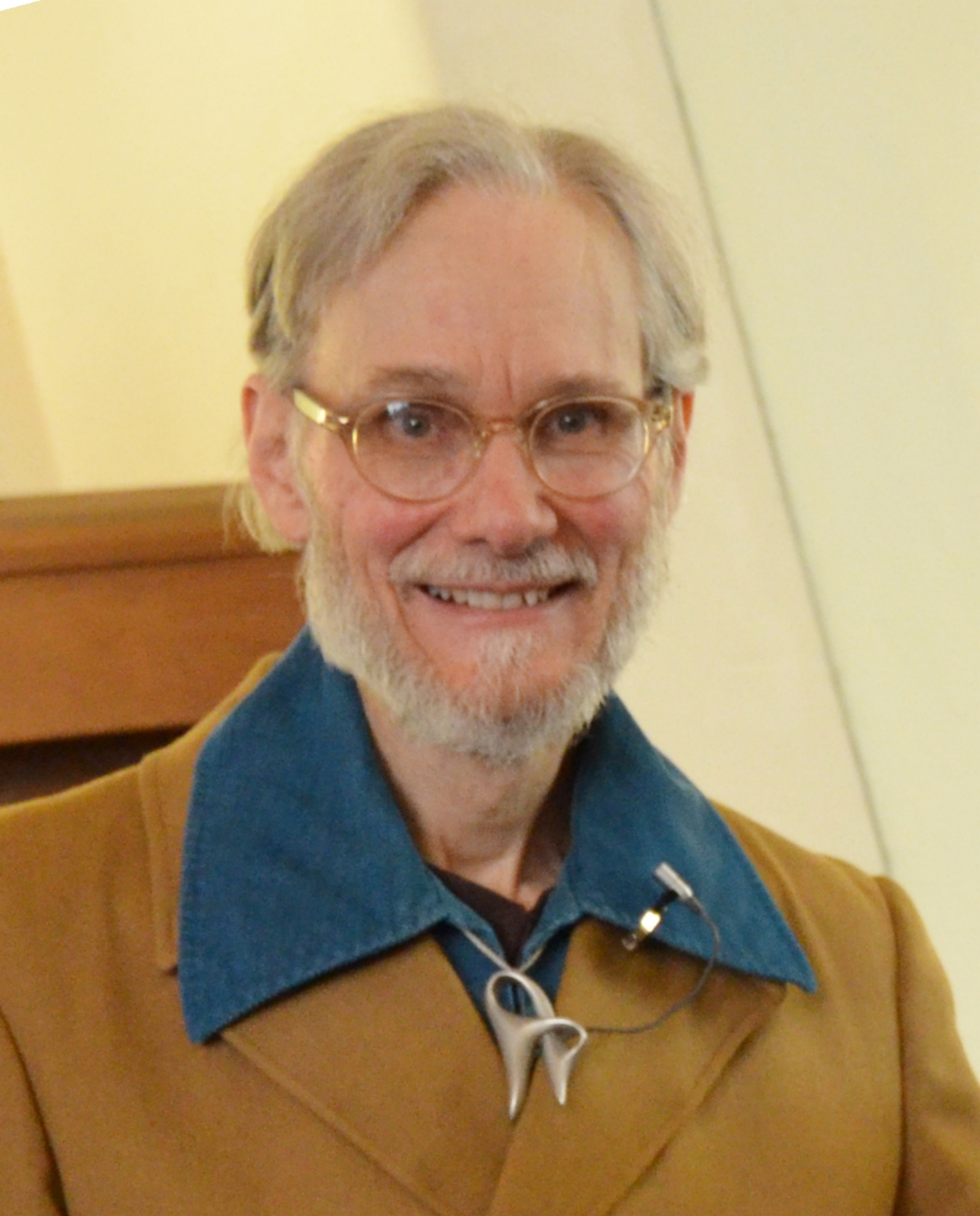
- Born: 1950: (Age 76); Albuquerque, New Mexico, U.S.
- Occupations: Artist, Writer/ Poet, Peace Advocate
- Known for: Paul Bartlett Ré Peace Prize Arizona Book Award for Philosophy (2016), Independent Press Award for Distinguished Favorite in Fine Arts (2019)
- Notable work: "Art, Peace and Transcendence: Réograms That Elevate and Unite" "The Dance of the Pencil: Serene Art"; Traveling Exhibit of "Touchable Art for the Blind and Sighted"
- Website: https://www.paulre.org/

Paul Bartlett Ré (pronounced "Ray") is an American artist, writer, poet, and peace advocate. He is known for his book The Dance of the Pencil: Serene Art by Paul Ré and for the Paul Bartlett Ré Peace Prize administered by the University of New Mexico Foundation.

His book Art, Peace, and Transcendence: Réograms That Elevate and Unite, received the 2016 New Mexico–Arizona Book Award for Philosophy and the 2019 Independent Press Award for Distinguished Favorite in Fine Arts.

In 2007, the University of New Mexico (UNM) established a biannual peace prize named after him, honoring his commitment and work for promoting peace around the world.

He was named to the 2024 Dr. Fred Shair and Mr. Paul Ré SURF Fellowship at the California Institute of Technology. Shair founded SURF in 1979.

His album, Paul Ré: Compositions for Classical Guitar, was released in 2025 on numerous platforms where it can be heard for free.

Paul's poetry was included in the 2026 anthology "A Year of New Mexico Poetry" which featured national, state, and municipal poets laureate. Paul's poems there were written during his 1982 and 1984 residencies at the Helene Wurlitzer Foundation of New Mexico in Taos, New Mexico.

His maternal grandparents were from England.

== Biography ==
Paul Bartlett Ré was born in Albuquerque, New Mexico, in 1950. He was valedictorian of his high school, and went on to earn a B.Sc. in Physics from the California Institute of Technology in 1972 (Veronda, Winifred, 1989). He began drawing using pencil. Writing in the San Francisco Chronicle, art critic Alfred Frankenstein said, "Ré is a virtuoso of the pencil, which he uses with incredible delicacy and refinement." (Frankenstein, Alfred, 1974) Paul Ré has also exhibited acrylic paintings, found object constructions, sculpture, bas-reliefs, embossings, Réograms (hybrid hand-digital prints), and sumi-e paintings. In the encyclopedia, Contemporary Graphic Artists, art historian Denis Wepman wrote, "The singular purity of Ré's simple, highly stylized designs gives them a unique place in modern art." The extraordinary sensitivity of their line and composition appeals to the senses with a haunting directness" (Wepman, Dennis, 1988).

Ré started exhibiting in California and New Mexico during the 1970s. Since then, he has had 22 solo exhibits in 13 states, including at the UNM Jonson Gallery, Albuquerque Museum, Triangle Gallery, Wichita Museum, Sumter Gallery, J. B. Speed Museum, the Colorado Springs Museum and the Karpeles Museum.

In 1979, Ré began creating embossed works, and the resulting exhibition “TOUCHABLE ART: An Exhibit for the Blind and the Sighted” traveled in the United States and Canada from 1981 to 1994. During its 18 showings, about 100,000 people experienced the works; a handmade, thermoformed companion volume with Braille and text was produced in 1983. (Reed, David, 1990) A documentary film on his Art was produced by SCETV in 1990.

In 1993, the volume "THE DANCE OF THE PENCIL: Serene Art by Paul Ré” collected and chronicled the development of Ré's work up to that date.

Ré has also composed music. His 50-minute recording, Compositions for Classical Guitar, included an introduction to his traveling exhibit. It was reviewed in the summer 1986 issue of THE LOG OF THE BRIDGETENDER of the American Council of the Blind by editor Sue Tullos. (Tullos, Sue, 1986) During his career, Paul's work was documented in Contemporary Graphic Artists, Volume 3 (1988), a reference publication edited by Maurice Horn and published by Gale Research. The volume included a biographical profile of Re together with information on his artistic activities, publications, and selected examples of his work. Horn, Maurice, ed. Contemporary Graphic Artists. Vol. 3. Detroit, Michigan: Gale Research, 1988, pp. 183–188 Paul showed an early interest in science and physics. He won first place in physics and NASA awards at the International Science Fair for two separate projects.

== Paul Bartlett Ré Peace Prize ==
The biannual Paul Bartlett Ré Peace Prize was established at the University of New Mexico in 2006 with the stated intent of continuing Ré's work of promoting "harmony in the world". Managed by the UNM Foundation, the award is given to a UNM person who has demonstrated notable achievements in promoting world peace and understanding. From 2007 to 2026, 47 individuals and organizations have been honored in four categories: the main award, lifetime achievement, career achievement, and emerging promoter of peace. Videos of the 2020 and 2022 Paul Bartlett Ré Peace Prize Reception feature presentations by Paul Ré, the Selection Committee, and the awardees. These 2-hour-and-20-minute programs can be seen on YouTube. The 1 hour and 36 minute The 2024 Paul Bartlett Ré Peace Prize Virtual Reception can be viewed on YouTube. The website of the 2024 winner, Katie Stone of The Children's Hour, can be seen here. Wesleyan University Press wrote this about Gerald Vizenor, recipient of the 2020 Paul Bartlett Ré Peace Prize Lifetime Achievement Award.

== See also ==
- List of poets from the United States

== Bibliography ==
- Ré, Paul. Touchable Art for the Blind and Sighted. Limited handmade edition, Paul Ré, 1985.
- Ré: Paul. The Dance of the Pencil: Serene Art by Paul Re, 1992.
- Ré, Paul, Art, Peace, and Transcendence: Reograms That Elevate and Unite. Albuquerque: University of New Mexico Press, 2015.
- Ré, Paul. "Complex Symmetries in Reograms." In Complex Symmetries, edited by G. Darvas. Basl: Birkhauser/Springer, 2021.
- Ré, Paul (ed.). The Iris Ballet. Collected poems, in preparation.
- Ré, Paul (comp.). The Recycled Dictionary: 55 Volumes of Aphorisms and Micro-Essays. Ongoing compilation of Ré writings.
- Ré: Paul Bartlett. "On the Use of My Basic Shapes in Toys and Learning Materials for Children." "New America" 5, no. 1 (1984): 65-74. "The Child in America" (volume title), Nancy Theriot, editor, UNM Press.
- Ré was included in Caltech's Baxter Art Gallery 1981 show "Barry Fahr, Tom Jenkins, Paul Ré". A catalog was published and the Baxter Art Gallery exhibition files are included in the Smithsonian Archives of American Art.
- Ré was included in the 1988 XIII Biennale of Graphic Design in Brno, Czechoslovakia, an international exhibition focused on illustration, editorial art, and applied graphic design. A catalog was published in five languages.
- Ré published "Comments on B.L. Chilton's View of Geometric Form as a Kind of University Arts" in Leonardo in 1982.
- Ré published a letter in Leonardo titled "The Art of Raymond Jonson," appearing as a correction to his earlier review of Ed Garman's The Art of Raymond Jonson, Painter, 1983.

== Sources ==
- Adams, Anna, "Greening the Peace Movement," Mirage Magazine, Fall 2015, pages 38–39. http://www.unmalumni.com/mirage-magazine.html (scroll to pages 38–39.)
- Dancer, Faren, "The Artwork of Paul Ré and the Ré Peace Prize." Unicopia Green Radio, June 20, 2012.
- Frankenstein, Alfred. "Top-Notch Art." San Francisco Chronicle, February 25, 1974.
- Ingles, Paul; Kryder, Suzanne, "Artist Paul Ré Points the Way to Peace," Peace Talks Radio, February 24, 2017.
- Milling, Jimmy, "Touchable Works Are Pleasing to All", The Item, May 2, 1990, page 7. The Item - Google News Archive Search.
- Pulkka, Wesley, "Artist Ré extends Jonson's transcendental vision", Albuquerque Journal, October 7, 2001, page F5.
- Ré, Paul. "My Drawings and Paintings and a System for Their Classification." Leonardo, vol XIII n. 2, spring 1980, Oxford, England: Pergamon Press, pages 94–100. My Drawings and Paintings and a System for Their Classification
- Ré, Paul, "On My Drawings and Paintings: An Extension of the System of Their Classification", Leonardo, vol. XIV n. 2, spring 1981, Oxford, England: Pergamon Press, pages 106-14. On My Drawings and Paintings: An Extension of the System of Their Classification
- Ré, Paul, "On the Progression of My Figurative Drawings Toward Higher Abstraction and Outward Simplicity." Leonardo, vol. XV, n. 2, spring 1982, Oxford, England: Pergamon Press, pages 109-14. On the Progression of My Figurative Drawings toward Higher Abstraction and Outward Simplicity
- Ré, Paul. "On raised line basic shape embossings: art for blind persons." Journal of Visual Impairment & Blindness 77, no. 3 (1983): 119-121.
- Ré, Paul, "Balance and its Significance in my Drawings, Paintings, and Tactual Embossings for the Blind", Symmetry of Structure Symposium Abstracts, International Symmetry Association, August 13–19, 1989, Budapest, Hungary. http://symmetry-us.com/Journals/0-2/re.pdf
- Ré, Paul, "The Dance of the Pencil: Serene Art of Paul Ré", Paul Ré Archives, 1993 (limited edition of 1,000).
- Ré, Paul, "Réograms and the Paul Bartlett Ré Peace Prize at University of New Mexico", Journal of the Print World, Fall 2009, page 21.
- Ré, Paul, "Art, Peace, and Transcendence: Réograms That Elevate and Unite", UNM Press, 2015.
- Ré, Paul, "Complex Symmetries in Réograms," Complex Symmetries, G. Darvas, ed., Birkhauser, Cham, Switzerland, 2021.
- Ré, Paul, "Paul Ré - Bridging to Peace", Journal of the Print World, Summer 2025, Volume 49-3, pages 20–21.
- Reed, David W., ed. "A Book and Two Traveling Exhibits for the Blind and Sighted", Spirit Of Enterprise: The 1990 Rolex Awards, Bern, Switzerland: Buri International, 1990, pages 378-80.
- Ronstadt, Jason, "Art, Peace, and Transcendence: Réograms That Elevate and Unite," Journal of the Print World, April 2016, page 23.
- Salazar, Martin, "Duke City Native Starts Peace Prize", Albuquerque Journal, March 22, 2010, page A4: (subscription required)
- Schillaci, Kelle, "The Dance of the Pencil", Alibi, March 15, 1999:
- Slocum, Dana, ed. “Ré, Paul Bartlett.” In Who’s Who in America. 60th to 68th editions. Berkeley Heights, NJ: Marquis Who’s Who, 2006–2014 (and ongoing).
- ———, ed. “Ré, Paul Bartlett.” In Who’s Who in American Art. 26th to 34th editions. Berkeley Heights, NJ: Marquis Who’s Who, 2005–2014 (and ongoing).
- ———, ed. “Ré, Paul Bartlett.” In Who’s Who in the World. 24th to 31st editions. Berkeley Heights, NJ: Marquis Who’s Who, 2006–2014 (and ongoing).
- Steinberg, David, "Art of Living: Physics, Nature, and Inner Harmony Infuse the Diverse Works of Paul Ré," Sunday Albuquerque Journal, Life in New Mexico, February 7, 2016, page 17. http://www.abqjournal.com/719728/entertainment/physics-nature-and-inner-harmony-infuse-the-diverse-works-of-paul-re.html
- Tullos, Sue. “Meet F-I-A Member, Paul Ré.” The Log of the Bridgetender 18 (Summer 1986). Published by the American Council of the Blind.
- Veronda, Winnifred, "Paul Ré: Expressing the Art in Physics." Caltech News, Dec. 1977.
- Veronda, Winnifred, "Expressing the Art in Science", Caltech News, Vol 23-4, Aug .1989, pages 6–7.
- Wepman, Dennis, and Paul B. "Contemporary Graphic Artists, Vol. 3. Detroit, MI: Gale Research, 1988, pages 181-3.
- Wepman, Dennis, "Paul Ré, Dance of the Pencil", Journal of the Print World, Fall 1994, page 23.
