= Christopher Rose (judge) =

British judge

The Right Honourable Sir Christopher Rose

Lord Justice of Appeal

Personal details
- Born: 10 February 1937 (age 89)
- Education: Morecambe Grammar School, Lancashire (1947—1950); Repton School, Derbyshire (1950—1954); University of Leeds (1954—1957); Wadham College, Oxford (BCL, 1959)

Sir Christopher Dudley Roger Rose (born 10 February 1937) is a former judge of the Court of Appeal of England and Wales and a member of the Privy Council of the United Kingdom.

== Education ==
Christopher Rose was educated at Morecambe Grammar School (1947–1950), a former state grammar school, in the seaside town of Morecambe, in Lancashire, and Repton School (1950–1954), a boarding independent school for boys, in the village of Repton, in Derbyshire, followed by the University of Leeds (1954–1957), from which he obtained a degree in Law and Wadham College at the University of Oxford, from which he graduated as Bachelor of Civil Law (BCL), in 1959. He has acted as an Honorary Fellow at Wadham College since 1993.

== Life and career ==
Rose became Vice-President of the Criminal Division of the Court of Appeal in 1997. An early case he dealt with in that capacity was R v Lindsay and Kelly (1998), where preserved corpses belonging to the Royal College of Surgeons had been stolen. Rose ruled that the common law principle that "there is no property in a corpse" did not apply once skilled work had been invested in the preservation of the corpses, and therefore the defendants could be found guilty of theft, contrary to the Theft Act 1968. In 2002 he was Treasurer of the Middle Temple. On 24 April 2006 he retired, and soon afterwards he was appointed Chief Surveillance Commissioner, a post which he held until 2015.

During his time on the Court of Appeal he was an outspoken critic of recent legislation, in particular the Criminal Justice Act 2003 and the Sexual Offences Act 2003, which he criticised as being poorly drafted, saying: "If a history of criminal legislation ever comes to be written it is unlikely that 2003 will be identified as a year of exemplary skill in the annals of Parliamentary drafting."

In 2009 he said that the Civil Nuclear Constabulary's "approach to covert activity" was "conspicuously professional". He found that the system for storing the intelligence gained from informers was "working well" and that "senior officers regard covert surveillance as a long-term requirement".
