= Gruber Foundation =

American philanthropic foundation

The Gruber Foundation
- Founded: 1993
- Purpose: Cosmology; Genetics; Neuroscience; Justice; Women's Rights
- Location: Yale University Office of Development, New Haven, Connecticut
- Origins: The Peter and Patricia Gruber Foundation
- Key people: Patricia and Peter Gruber (co-founders)
- Revenue: $4,681,748 (2016)
- Expenses: $3,291,482 (2016)
- Website: gruber.yale.edu

The Gruber Foundation is a philanthropic foundation established by Peter and Patricia Gruber and is based at Yale University in New Haven, Connecticut. Its mission is to honor and encourage excellence in the fields of cosmology, genetics, neuroscience, justice, and women's rights, which encompasses three major programmatic initiatives: the Gruber Prizes and the Young Scientists Awards; the Gruber Science Fellowship Program; and the Gruber Program for Global Justice and Women's Rights at Yale Law School.

== Gruber Prizes ==
The International Prize Program awards the annual Gruber Prizes:

- Gruber Prize in Cosmology first awarded in 2000
- Gruber Prize in Genetics first awarded in 2001
- Gruber Prize in Neuroscience first awarded in 2004
- Gruber Prize for Justice awarded from 2001 to 2011
- Gruber Prize for Women's Rights awarded from 2003 to 2011

The prizes, which are awarded to prominent scientists, social scientists, and jurists in these subjects, provide a gold medal and a cash award of US$500,000.

The Young Scientist Awards recognize brilliant early career international scientists and are selected in partnership with major scientific organizations:

- International Astronomical Union Fellowships
- Rosalind Franklin Young Investigator Award, in partnership with the Genetics Society of America and the American Society for Human Genetics
- Peter and Patricia Gruber International Research Award in Neuroscience, in partnership with the Society for Neuroscience
- Peter and Patricia Gruber Awards at the Weizmann Institute of Science in Rehovot, Israel

== Gruber Science Fellowships ==
Established in 2011, the Gruber Science Fellowships are the most prestigious awards offered by the Yale Graduate School of Arts and Sciences. Annually, only approximately 20 are awarded to the most highly ranked applicants to Yale PhD programs in the life sciences, cosmology, and astrophysics, in recognition of their outstanding accomplishments and exceptional promise.

In April 2024, the foundation announced its third Early Career Fellowship administered by the International Astronomical Union.

== Gruber Program for Global Justice and Women's Rights ==
Administered by Yale Law School, the Gruber Program for Global Justice and Women's Rights continues and expands upon the missions of the previous Justice and Women's Rights Prizes, from which it evolved. Currently, the program consists of four core components:

- Global Constitutionalism Seminar
- Gruber Distinguished Lectures in Global Justice and Women's Rights
- Gruber Global Justice and Women's Rights Fellowships
- Gruber Project in Global Justice and Women’s Rights
