= World Cultural Council =

Mexico-based international organization for cultural values, goodwill and philanthropy

- Abbreviation: WCC
- Formation: 1982
- Type: INGO
- Location: Mexico City
- Region served: Worldwide
- President: Prof. Omar Yaghi
- Website: consejoculturalmundial.org

The World Cultural Council is an international organization aiming to promote cultural values, goodwill, and philanthropy among individuals. The organization founded in 1982 and based in Mexico, has held a yearly award ceremony since 1984 by granting the Albert Einstein World Award of Science, the José Vasconcelos World Award of Education, and the Leonardo da Vinci World Award of Arts to outstanding scientists, educators, and artists, who have contributed positively to the cultural enrichment of mankind. The members of the Council include several Nobel laureates.

== Founding members ==
The founding members of the World Cultural Council are 124 distinguished personalities in such fields as the arts, biology, chemistry, physics, medicine, psychology, neuroscience, astronomy, oceanography, astrophysics, anthropology, and zoology. Some of these members are recipients of awards because of their outstanding achievements including the Nobel Prize, the National Medal of Science, the Copley Medal, the Royal Medal, the Albert Einstein Medal, the Albert Lasker Award and the Enrico Fermi Award. Some of the founders are also Foreign Members or Fellows of the Royal Society, Fellows of the American Physical Society, and the Royal Swedish Academy of Sciences.

The 124 founding members of the World Cultural Council are:

Christian B. Anfinsen

Werner Arber
James Baddiley
M. Balasegaram
Frank Barnaby
Christiaan Barnard
Colin Blakemore
Aage N. Bohr
Norman Borlaug
Harold G. Callan
André Frédéric Cournand
William J. Darby
Eduardo de Robertis
Cornelis de Jager
Guy Blaudin de Thé
Jean-François Denisse
Venancio Deulofeu
Frank J. Dixon
Richard S. Doll
Audouin Dollfus
Jacques-Émile Dubois
Gerald Durrell
Francisco J. Dy
John C. Eccles
Paul Ehrlich
Manfred Eigen
Mohammed El Fasi
Ernest L. Eliel
Kenneth O. Emery
José Rafael Estrada
Hans J. Eysenck
Don W. Fawcett
David J. Finney
Val L. Fitch
Carl G. Gahmberg
Alfred D. Hershey
Gerhard Herzberg
David H. Hubel
Osmo H. Järvi
Reginald V. Jones
Adrian Kantrowitz
Nathan O. Kaplan
Leo A. Kaprio
Vassos Karageorghis
Peter E. Kent
Donald W. Kerst
Seymour S. Kety
Prem N. Kirpal
Georges B. Koelle
Walther Manshard
Georges Mathé
William D. McElroy
Henry McIlwain
John McMichael
Jerrold Meinwald
Harry Melville
Desmond J. Morris
Giuseppe Moruzzi
Nevill Mott
Vernon B. Mountcastle
Robert S. Mulliken
Walter H. Munk
Ilie G. Murgulescu
Jayant V. Narlikar
Louis E. F. Néel
Yuval Ne'eman
Bernhard H. Neumann
William A. Nierenberg
Marshall W. Nirenberg
George E. Palade
Arthur B. Pardee
David Phillips
Jacques Piccard
Jens J. Pindborg
Comlan A. A. Quenum
Hermann Rahn
G. N. Ramachandran
Gunnar Randers
Chintamani N. R. Rao
Rex Richards
Jean Rösch
Abraham J. A. Roux
Stanley K. Runcorn
Donald H. Sadler
Hakim Muhammad Saeed
Nobufusa Saito
Abdus Salam
Stuart J. Saunders
Menahem Max Schiffer
William G. Schneider
Glenn T. Seaborg
Ernest R. Sears
Frederick Seitz
Leonard T. Skeggs
Stefan Ślopek
George J. Smets
George D. Snell
Leonard Sosnowky
Roger W. Sperry
Lyman Spitzer
Frederick Stewart
Heikki Suomalainen
Pol Swings
Charles Tanford
Henry Taube
John M. Tedder
Edward Teller
Howard Temin
Harold Thompson
Peter Thonemann
Phillip V. Tobias
Alexander R. Todd
Jan Peter Toennies
Andrzej Trautman
Jean L. F. Tricart
Ioan Ursu
Constantin Vago
Eugene van Tamelen
Ulf S. von Euler
Alan Walsh
William J. Whelan
Karel F. Wiesner
Rosalyn S. Yalow

John Z. Young

== Presidents of the World Cultural Council ==
Charles Tanford (1984-1987)
Werner Stumm (1988-1991)
José Estrada (1992-2007)
Edmond H. Fischer (2008-2014)
Colin Blakemore (2015-2021)
Fraser Stoddart (2022-2024)
Omar M. Yaghi (2025)

== Award ceremonies ==
Year	Award Recipients	Ceremony Host	Ceremony Site	Ceremony Host Country	Ceremony Date	Ref.
2025	Mercouri Kanatzidis	World Cultural Council	Museum of Contemporary Arts, Monterrey	Mexico	October 22, 2025	
2024	Eske Willerslev, Cónal Creedon	McGill University	McGill University, Montreal	Canada	October 23, 2024	
2023	Christoph Gerber, Larry V. Hedges	University of Helsinki	University of Helsinki, Helsinki	Finland	November 2–3, 2023	
2022	Victoria M. Kaspi, Meejin Yoon, Claudia Mitchell	University of Coimbra	University of Coimbra, Coimbra	Portugal	November 29–30, 2022	
2019	Zhong Lin Wang, Paulo Branco	University of Tsukuba	University of Tsukuba, Tsukuba	Japan	October 4, 2019	
2018	Jean-Pierre Changeux, Malik Mâaza	City University of Hong Kong	City University of Hong Kong, Hong Kong	Hong Kong	November 8, 2018	
2017	Omar M. Yaghi, Russell Hartenberger	Leiden University	Pieterskerk, Leiden	Netherlands	November 8, 2017	
2016	Edward Witten, Kalevi Ekman	Riga Technical University	National Library of Latvia, Riga	Latvia	October 14, 2016	
2015	Ewine van Dishoeck, Milton Masciadri	University of Dundee	Caird Hall, Dundee, Scotland	United Kingdom	November 19, 2015	
2014	Philip Cohen, Federico Rosei	Aalto University	Otakaari 1 Building, Aalto University, Espoo	Finland	November 17, 2014	
2013	Paul Nurse, Petteri Nisunen, Tommi Grönlund	Nanyang Technological University	Nanyang Auditorium, Nanyang Technological University, Singapore	Singapore	October 2, 2013	
2012	Michael Grätzel, Hans Ulrich Gumbrecht	Aarhus University	The Main Hall, Aarhus University, Aarhus	Denmark	April 18, 2012	
2011	Geoffrey Ozin, Todd Siler	University of Tartu	Assembly Hall, University of Tartu, Tartu	Estonia	November 10, 2011	
2010	Julio Montaner, Christian Azar	Universidad Autónoma del Estado de México	Aula Magna Adolfo López Mateos, UAEM, Toluca	Mexico	December 8, 2010	
2009	John T. Houghton, Marcell Jankovics	University of Liège	Salle Académique, University of Liège, Liège	Belgium	November 25, 2009	
2008	Ada Yonath, William G. Bowen	Princeton University	Richardson Auditorium, Alexander Hall, Princeton University, Princeton, New Jersey	United States	November 11, 2008	
2007	Fraser Stoddart, Anne Moeglin-Delcroix	Universidad Autónoma de Nuevo León	Teatro Universitario, Campus Mederos, Monterrey	Mexico	November 24, 2007	
2006	Ahmed Zewail, Marlene Scardamalia	Instituto Politécnico Nacional	Sala Manuel M. Ponce, Palacio de Bellas Artes, Mexico City	Mexico	October 28, 2006	
2005	John Hopfield, Enrique Norten	Universidad Autónoma Agraria Antonio Narro	Teatro de la Ciudad Fernando Soler, Saltillo	Mexico	November 12, 2005	
2004	Ralph J. Cicerone, David Attenborough	University of Liège	Amphithéâtres de l’Europe, University of Liège, Liège	Belgium	November 8, 2004	
2003	Martin Rees, Otto Piene	University of Helsinki, Finnish Society of Sciences and Letters	National Library of Finland, University of Helsinki, Helsinki	Finland	November 17, 2003	
2002	Daniel H. Janzen, Jeannie Oakes	Trinity College, Dublin	Examination Hall, Trinity College, Dublin, Dublin	(Republic of Ireland) Ireland	November 14, 2002	
2001	Niels Birbaumer, Edna Hibel	Utrecht University	Academiegebouw, Utrecht	Netherlands	November 21, 2001	
2000	Frank Fenner, Zafra M. Lerman	University of the Witwatersrand	Great Hall, University of the Witwatersrand, Johannesburg	South Africa	November 1, 2000	
1999	Robert Weinberg, Magdalena Abakanowicz	Norwegian University of Science and Technology	Main Building, Norwegian University of Science and Technology, Trondheim	Norway	November 11, 1999	
1998	Charles R. Goldman, Robert Yager	Victoria University of Wellington	Hunter Building, Wellington	New Zealand	November 19, 1998	
1997	Jean-Marie Ghuysen	Chulalongkorn University	Main Auditorium, Chulalongkorn University, Bangkok	Thailand	November 12, 1997	
1996	Alec Jeffreys, Roger Gaudry	University of Oxford	Voltaire Room, Taylor Institution, Oxford	United Kingdom	November 23, 1996	
1995	Herbert H. Jasper, Robert Rauschenberg	INBA, CONACULTA	Palacio de Bellas Artes, Mexico City	Mexico	December 16, 1995	
1994	Sherwood Rowland, Joseph O´Halloran	CODATA, ICSU, UNESCO	Le Manège Convention Center, Chambéry	France	September 19, 1994	
1993	Ali Javan	Presidencia de la República	Palacio de Bellas Artes, Mexico City	Mexico	December 19, 1993	
1992	Raymond U . Lemieux, Elliot Eisner	National Research Council (Canada)	Lester B. Pearson Building, Ottawa	Canada	November 27, 1992	
1991	Albrecht Fleckenstein	Australian National University	Chancellor's Building, ANU, Canberra	Australia	November 14, 1991	
1990	Gustav Nossal, Lev Shevrin	Eidgenössische Technische Hochschule Zürich	Cupola Room, ETH Zürich, Zürich	Switzerland	November 22, 1990	
1989	Martin Kamen, Athens Acropolis Preservation Group of Greece	Massachusetts Institute of Technology	Edgerton Hall, MIT, Cambridge	United States	November 8, 1989	
1988	Margaret Burbidge, Gilbert De Landsheere	Instituto Politécnico Nacional	Palacio de Bellas Artes, Mexico City	Mexico	November 19, 1988	
1987	Hugh Huxley	University of Heidelberg	Alte Aula, University of Heidelberg, Heidelberg	Germany	November 26, 1987	
1986	Monkombu Sambasivan Swaminathan	University of Guadalajara	Teatro Degollado, Guadalajara	Mexico	November 6, 1986	
1985	Werner Stumm, Dolores Hernández	Royal Institute of Technology	Kollegiesalen, Stockholm	Sweden	November 21, 1985	
1984	Ricardo Bressani	World Cultural Council	Auditorio San Pedro, San Pedro Garza García	Mexico	November 29, 1984	

=== Special recognitions ===
Starting in 2003, the World Cultural Council issues Special Recognitions to expert researchers connected to the host of the award ceremony, and which findings have been made available to the public.

Year	Recognitions
2017	Nadine Akkerman, Ann Brysbaert, Marike Knoef, Marianne Maeckelbergh, Victoria Nyst, Sarah De Rijcke, Alicia Schrikker, Martina Vijver, Inge van der Weijden
2016	Elīna Gaile-Sarkane, Jānis Grundspeņķis, Tālis Juhna, Kaspars Kalniņš, Jānis Krastiņš, Oskars Krievs, Guntis Kuļikovskis, Igors Tipāns, Māris Turks
2015	Catherine Heymans, Sara Brown, Sara Robertson, Sarah Coulthurst, Lisa DeBruine, Sinéad Rhodes
2014	Camilla Hollanti, Katri Kauppi, Mauri Kostiainen, Matti Kuttinen, Jani Romanoff, Hele Savin
2013	Educational Merit Medal: Bertil Andersson. Science: Juliana Chan, David Lou Xiong Wen, Wang Qijie, Zhang Hua. Education: Jasmine Sim Boon Yee
2012	Educational Merit Medal: Lauritz Holm-Nielsen. Science: Anders Baun, Trine Bilde, Peter Brodersen, Johan P. U. Fynbo, Anja Groth, Jakob Søndergaard Jensen, Lars Bojer Madsen, Jesper Buus Nielsen
2011	Educational Merit Medal: Alar Karis. Recognitions: Toomas Asser, Jaan Einasto, Kalle Kasemaa, Peeter Saari, Rein Taagepera, Jüri Talvet, Vaike Uibopuu, Urmas Varblane, Richard Villems
2010	
2009	Educational Merit Medal: Bernard Rentier. Science: Jean-Marie Baland, Christophe Caucheteur, Jérôme Cornil, Vinciane Despret, Luc Henrard, Steven Laureys. Arts: Mady Andrien, Patrick Davin, Jacques Delcuvellerie, Karel Logist, Jean-Philippe Toussaint
2008	Science: Ignacio Rodriguez-Iturbe, Bonnie Bassler. Education: Douglas Massey, Cornel West.
2007	Science: Germán Cisneros, María del Socorro Flores, Carlos Guerrero, Mario César Salinas, Óscar Torres. Arts: Alejandro Gómez, Adolfo Narváez, Alfonso Rangel, Ana Silvia Rodríguez, José Javier Villarreal
2006	Science: René Drucker Colin, Octavio Paredes López, Gerardo Silverio Contreras
2005	Science: Atocha Aliseda Llera (UNAM), Pavel Castro Villarreal (UNAM), Miguel Mellado Bosque (UAAAN). Arts: Elsa Cross, Felipe Garrido, Pilar Rioja.
2004	Science: André Berger, Guy Brasseur, Arsène Burny, Jacques Pasteels, Marc Van Montagu. Education: Jean-Marie De Ketele, Hadelin Hainaut, Dieudonné Leclercq, Lieven Verschaeffel
2003	Science: Sören Illiman, Markku Kulmala, Antti Vaheri. Arts: Eija-Liisa Ahtila, Hannu Kähönen, Yrjö Kukkapuro, Vuokko Eskolin-Nurmesniemi, Nina Roos, Henry Wuorila-Stenberg

== See also ==
- Albert Einstein World Award of Science
- Leonardo da Vinci World Award of Arts
- José Vasconcelos World Award of Education
- Lists of art awards
- List of science awards
- List of education awards
