= World Cultural Council 29th Award Ceremony =

- Cover page of event invitation
- Date: April 18, 2012
- Location: The Main Hall, Aarhus University, Aarhus
- Country: Denmark
- Presented by: World Cultural Council
- Hosted by: Professor Lauritz B. Holm-Nielsen
- Rewards: Medal, diploma and $10,000US

Highlights
- Albert Einstein World Award of Science: Professor Michael Grätzel
- José Vasconcelos World Award of Education: Professor Hans Ulrich Gumbrecht
- Website: www.excellence2012.dk/wcc-award-2012/

The World Cultural Council celebrated its 29th award ceremony on 18 April 2012 at The Main Hall, Aarhus University, Aarhus, Denmark. Aarhus University was the co-organizer of the ceremony, which was the opening event of the conference "Excellence Revisited – The Value of Excellence."

The WCC bestowed two awards at the ceremony, which were the Albert Einstein World Award of Science and the José Vasconcelos World Award of Education.

Professor Michael Grätzel received the Albert Einstein World Award of Science as a recognition for his studies in photonics, and the conversion of solar energy into electricity. Among his contributions, he co-invented the dye-sensitized solar cell, which can be manufactured using low-cost materials. Professor Hans Ulrich Gumbrecht won the José Vasconcelos World Award of Education because of his thought provoking influence in philosophy.

Jussi Nuorteva, member of the WCC and Director of the National Archives of Finland, presented the Winners' Book. Both laureates Professor Michael Grätzel and Professor Hans Ulrich Gumbrecht signed the WCC book having witnesses from Aarhus University and the WCC.

Professor Lauritz B. Holm-Nielsen, Rector of Aarhus University, received the Medal for Educational Merit for his contribution and development of the Danish research and innovation system and university education.

The WCC did a special recognition to eight talented researchers for their outstanding contribution in sciences: Anders Baun, Trine Bilde, Peter Brodersen, Johan P. U. Fynbo, Anja Groth, Jakob Søndergaard Jensen, Lars Bojer Madsen, and Jesper Buus Nielsen.

Prior to the award ceremony, Professor Michael Grätzel, Nobel laureate Professor Edmond Fischer, and Professor Hans Ulrich Gumbrecht presented public lectures
