= Kristin Schirmer =

German cell biologist and toxicologist

Professor Kristin Schirmer
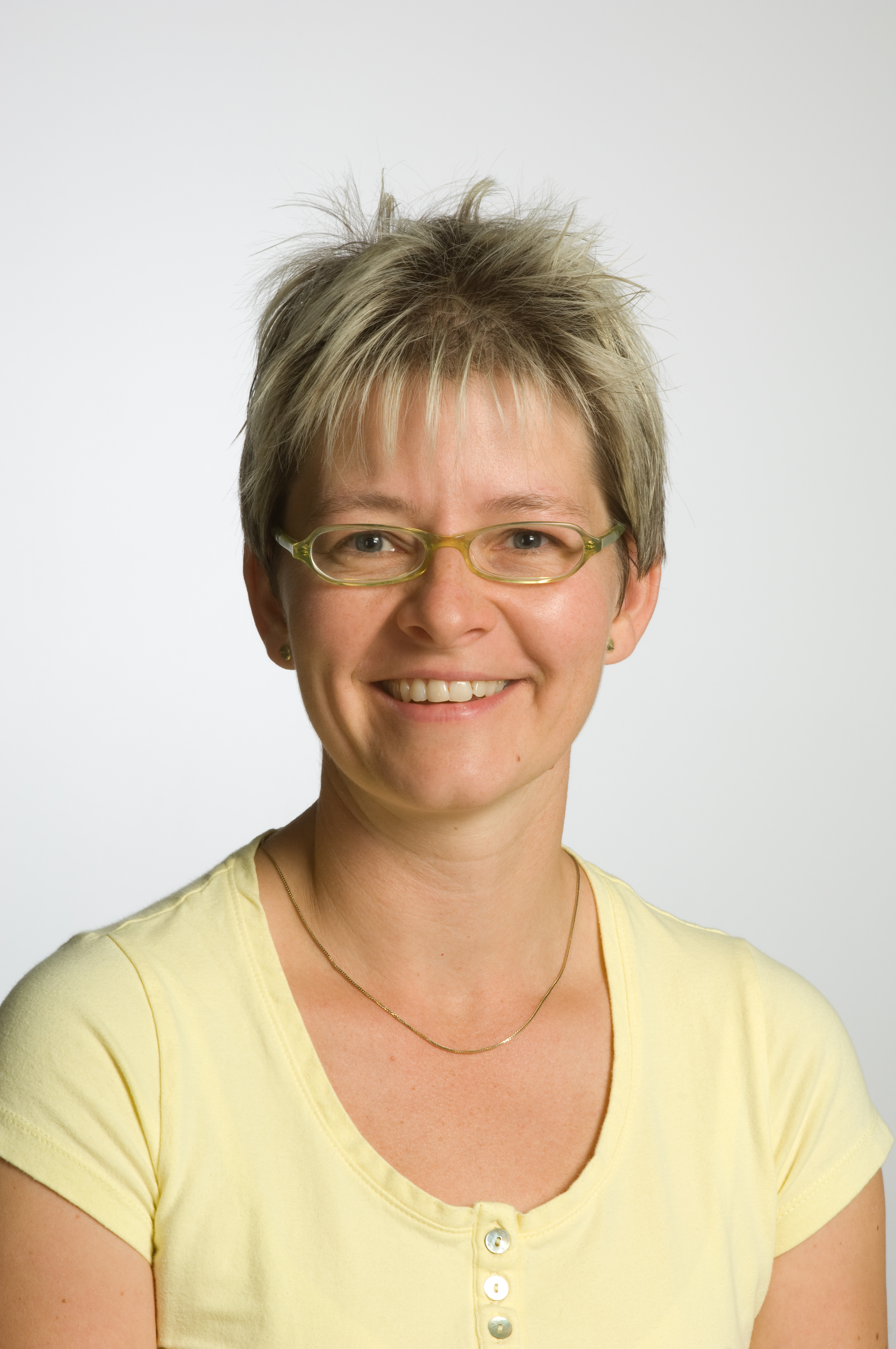
- Kristine Schirmer in 2008
- Born: 1967 (age 58–59)

Academic background
- Education: Biology
- Alma mater: University of Hohenheim; Martin Luther University of Halle-Wittenberg; University of Waterloo

Academic work
- Discipline: Biology
- Sub-discipline: Toxicity
- Institutions: EAWAG; EPFL (École Polytechnique Fédérale de Lausanne); ETH Zurich
- Website: https://tox.epfl.ch/

Kristin Schirmer (born 1967) is a German cell biologist and toxicologist. She is the Head of Department of Environmental Toxicology at the Swiss Federal Institute of Aquatic Science and Technology (Eawag)] and also a professor at the Swiss Federal Institute of Technology in Lausanne (EPFL) and ETH Zurich. Schirmer specializes in Molecular and Cellular Mechanisms of Toxicity, Aquatic Organisms, Chemical Hazard Assessment, Adverse Outcome Pathways, in vitro Alternatives to Animal Testing, Fish Cell Lines and Biomonitoring.

== Early life and education ==
From 1989 to 1994 Schirmer earned her biology diploma at the University of Hohenheim and the Martin-Luther-University Halle-Wittenberg. After that she continued as a Ph.D. student at the Department of Biology of the University of Waterloo in Canada, where she worked on her doctoral thesis on the development of in vitro toxicity assays with rainbow trout cells. From 1997 to 2001 Schirmer completed her Postdoctoral Training at the Helmholtz Centre for Environmental Research and University of Waterloo. From 2001 to 2003 she was the Junior Research Group Leader at UFZ in Leipzig.

== Career and research ==
In 2008 Kristin Schirmer was appointed as the new head of the Environmental Toxicology department at Eawag. Before that she had already taught Ecotoxicology as a professor at the ETH Zurich. In 2011 Schirmer began teaching at the EPFL and was awarded the title of adjunct professor.

In 2019 the Swiss 3R Competence Centre, a nonprofit association located in Bern, which promotes research for the replacement and reduction of animal experimentation, awarded Kristin Schirmer and her colleague Melanie Fisher for their exceeding research work. They received ISO certification for a toxicity test utilizing cultured fish gill cells instead of fish, which proves to be a milestone in the promotion of alternate procedures to animal testing .

With other researchers from Eawag Schirmer took part in developing a business idea named "Rainbow Biosystem", creating a fish-cell-based biosensor that provides a solution for managing and monitoring the quality of water. For this they received the 3rd prize in the business plan category by Venture, a Swiss start-up competition.

In December 2020 ETH Zurich appointed her as titular professor.

Currently the main focus of her research is on the freshwater environment and on fish or single-cell organisms as experimental models, as well as on human-made products and chemicals, naturally occurring elements, biologically derived toxins as stressors.

== Awards and honors ==
Awards won include:

- 2019 Recipient of the 3RCC Award of the Swiss3R Competence Centre (together with her colleague Melanie Fischer)
- 2017 Venture competition – New business idea: the Rainbow Biosystem; 3rd prize
- 2007 SETAC Environmental Education Award
- 2007 Felix-Wankel Animal Welfare Research Award
- 2007 Technology Transfer Award for Ceramic Toximeter passives sampler (Helmholtz Centre for Environmental Research - UFZ)
- 1998 W.B. Pearson Medal for recognition of creative research in a Doctoral thesis
- 1997 Best Student Platform Presentation Award, 24th Aquatic Toxicity Workshop
- 1994 - 1996 University of Waterloo and Ontario International Graduate Student Scholarship
