= Janet Hering =

US-American biochemist

Janet Gordon Hering
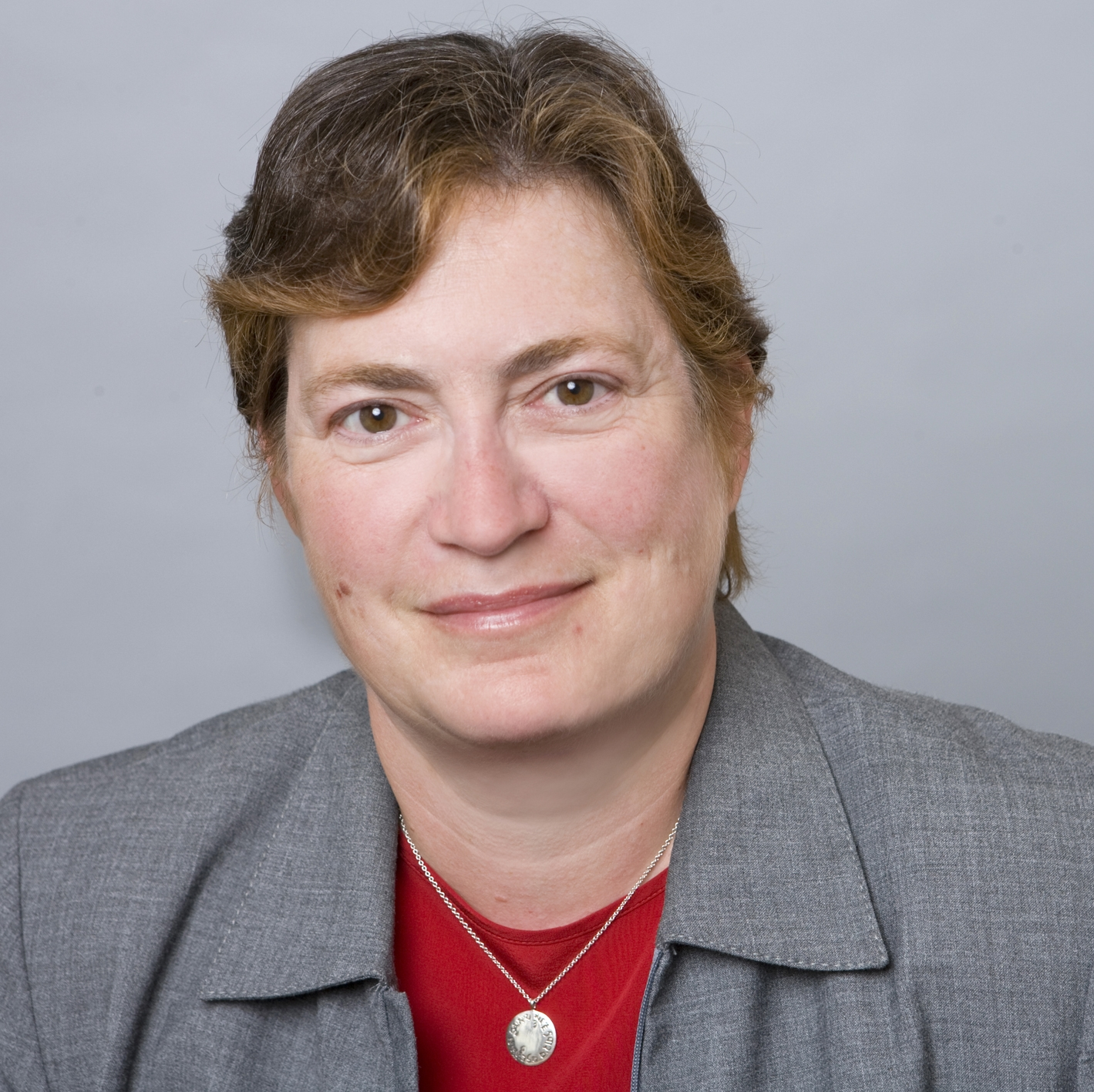
- Janet Hering in 2020
- Born: 1958 (age 67–68)
- Education: Cornell University; Harvard University; Massachusetts Institute of Technology; Woods Hole Oceanographic Institution
- Scientific career
- Workplaces: Swiss Federal Institute of Aquatic Science and Technology; EPFL; ETH Zurich; California Institute of Technology; University of California, Los Angeles
- Thesis: The Kinetics and Thermodynamics of Copper Complexation in Aquatic Systems (1988)

Janet Gordon Hering (born 1958) is the former Director of the Swiss Federal Institute of Aquatic Science and Technology and Professor emeritus of Biogeochemistry at ETH Zurich and EPFL (École Polytechnique Fédérale de Lausanne). She works on the biogeochemical cycling of trace elements in water and the management of water infrastructure.

Hering was elected a member of the National Academy of Engineering in 2015 for contributions to understanding and practice of removal of inorganic contaminants from drinking water.

She serves on the review board for Science Magazine.

== Early life ==
Hering grew up in New York City. She studied chemistry at Cornell University and graduated in 1979. She was a summer intern at Mobil. She joined Harvard University for her graduate studies, earning a master's in chemistry in 1981, and began graduate work in organic chemistry. Hering realized that she preferred environmental sciences and moved to Massachusetts Institute of Technology and the Woods Hole Oceanographic Institution for her graduate studies. She completed her PhD thesis. "The Kinetics and Thermodynamics of Copper Complexation in Aquatic Systems" in 1988. Her supervisor, François Morel, described her research as "elegant work on the surprisingly slow kinetics of some reactions between trace metals and organic complexing agents in natural water". She described the aquatic chemistry associated with the preparation of Aquil, an artificial algal culture, and the coordination of transition metals in seawater. At MIT, Hering met Werner Stumm, who offered her a postdoctoral position at EAWAG.

== Research and career ==
Hering joined the Swiss Federal Institute of Aquatic Science and Technology (EAWAG) as a research fellow. She coordinated several scientific exchanges and managed international conferences. She co-authored the textbook Principles and Applications of Aquatic Chemistry with François Morel in 1993. The book was described by David Sedlak as a “a masterpiece that has influenced the way in which water chemistry is taught".

Hering moved to the University of California, Los Angeles in 1991 and was named Associate Professor in 1995. Around that time, Arsenic in water supplies became a worldwide concern. The World Health Organization recommended a value of only 10 μg per litre; as it can cause skin disease and cancer. Hering joined the California Institute of Technology in 1996, where she worked until 2006. Her work was supported by the National Science Foundation. She looked at the oxidation of arsenic in the Los Angeles Aqueduct, in particular at Hot Creek. Hot Creek is a geothermal area, where arsenic occurs at high concentrations as it degases from magma. The oxidation state of arsenic impacts its toxicity and mobility, as well as how easily it can be removed with treatment. By monitoring the amount of arsenic at various positions downstream, Hering found that the concentration remained constant, but the oxidation state changed. Hering found that arsenic was being oxidized into Arsenic(V) by a biological agent known as a macrophyte. She monitored Owens Lake, which is once of the largest in California but has dried up since the Los Angeles Aqueduct was constructed. The dusty lake bed results in large (> 10 μm) particles of high arsenic content airborne dust that can travel far and be inhaled. Hering worked closely with the Los Angeles Department of Water and Power to mitigate the arsenic in their watershed. She has continued to study arsenic contamination of water and ways to remove arsenic from drinking water. She identified that it was possible to remove arsenic from water using coagulation with ferric oxide and alum. Complete removal of Arsenic(V) oxide could be achieved after doses of 5 mg/L Ferric oxide. She has also investigated reverse osmosis and nanofiltration membranes, as well as on manganite surfaces. She gave evidence to the United States Environmental Protection Agency Ad Hoc Subcommittee on Arsenic Research and served on the Science Advisory Board. She was elected to the National Academies of Sciences, Engineering, and Medicine in 2015.

In 2007, she returned to the ETH Zurich, where she was appointed Professor of Environmental Biogeochemistry and became Director of EAWAG. She was the first woman to be made Director of a Swiss federal research institute, and served in that role through 2022. At EAWAG Hering was responsible for a $48 million annual budget, 300 staff and 100 graduate students. She was made a Professor of Environmental Chemistry at EPFL in 2010. Since her return to Switzerland, Hering has worked on water quality and management, as well as promoting collaboration between academics. She is an investigator of the National Science Foundation’s Engineering Research Center for Re-inventing the Nation's Urban Water Infrastructure (ReNUWIt). Hering has written about the need for more knowledge brokering and ways to use interdisciplinary science to address challenges in society. In particular, Hering has offered that if water research were synthesized, it would be possible to achieve the Sustainable Development Goals.

She was made an honorary fellow of IHE Delft Institute for Water Education in 2017 and a fellow of the Geochemical Society in 2018. She was awarded the Clarke Prize from the National Water Research Institute in 2018. She served as chairwoman of the ETH Zurich Women Professors forum.
