= Zafra M. Lerman =

American chemist and humanitarian

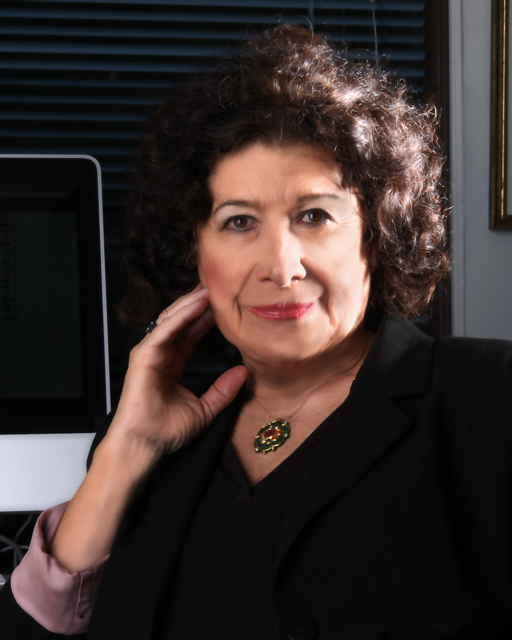
- Zafra Lerman, American Israeli chemist, human rights activist, and science diplomat
- Born: Zafra Jacobi; Nesher, British Mandate of Palestine (now Israel)
- Education: Ph.D (Chemistry, 1969) Weizmann Institute of Science, Rehovot, Israel; M.Sc. (Chemistry, 1964) Technion – Israel Institute of Technology, Haifa, Israel; B.Sc. (Chemistry, 1960) Technion – Israel Institute of Technology, Haifa, Israel
- Known for: Science diplomacy, Human rights activism, Science education that bridges art and science,
- Awards: Presidential Award for Excellence in Science, Mathematics and Engineering Mentoring (1999); AAAS Award for Science Diplomacy (2015); José Vasconcelos World Award of Education (2000)
- Scientific career
- Fields: Chemistry, Science education, Human rights, Science diplomacy
- Workplaces: Malta Conferences Foundation
- Doctoral advisor: Lord David Herbert Samuel

Zafra M. Lerman is an American chemist, educator, and humanitarian. She is the President of the Malta Conferences Foundation, which aims to promote peace by bringing together scientists from otherwise hostile countries to discuss science and foster international scientific and technical collaboration. From 1986 to 2010, she chaired the American Chemical Society's Subcommittee on Scientific Freedom and Human Rights. She has been successful in preventing executions, releasing prisoners of conscience from jail and bringing dissidents to freedom. She is the recipient of many awards for education and science diplomacy, including the 1999 Presidential Award from U.S. President Clinton, the 2005 Nyholm Prize for Education from the Royal Society of Chemistry (England), the 2015 Science Diplomacy Award from the American Association for the Advancement of Science (AAAS), the 2016 Andrei Sakharov Award for human rights from the American Physical Society (APS), the 2016 United Nations NOVUS Award for the 16th Sustainable Development Goal: Peace and Justice, the 2017 International Union of Pure and Applied Chemistry Distinguished Women in Chemistry or Chemical Engineering Award, and the 2025 Cardozo School of Law’s 24th International Advocate for Peace Award.

== Early career ==
Lerman received a Ph.D. in chemistry from the Weizmann Institute of Science in Rehovot, Israel. She conducted research on isotope effects at the Weizmann Institute of Science, Cornell University and Northwestern University in the US, and the ETH Zurich, Switzerland.

== Science education and the arts ==
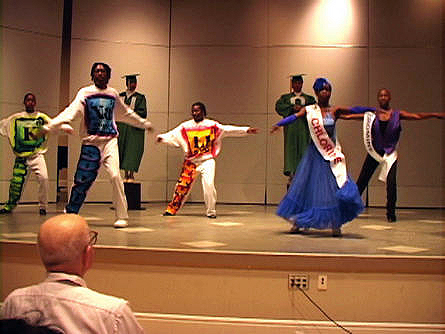
Zafra M Lerman students dancing to illustrate chemistry 2001 Gordon Conference (photo by David Morton)

Lerman used the arts to help teach science at all levels. In 1977, she became the first science faculty member at Columbia College Chicago, an institution of higher education specializing in arts and media disciplines. In 1981, she founded the department of science and mathematics there and served as department chair through 1991. In 1991, she founded the Institute for Science Education and Science Communication (also known as the 'Science Institute") at Columbia College and served as its head until 2009. Since 1991 she was a Distinguished Professor of Science and Public Policy.

Part of her teaching philosophy is captured in this quote, from a 2011 lecture entitled "Creativity in 3D: "Drawing, Dance, and Drama": "Students remember and understand abstract concepts best by producing their own artistic projects and using their own (sometimes hidden) creativity. Through this process, students are active learners, and utilize both their left and right brain, instead of being just passive observers."

== Peace activism ==
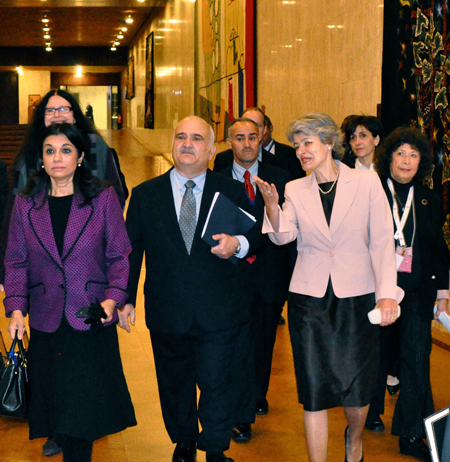
Malta V Conference at UNESCO headquarters in Paris, France, December 4, 2011; His Royal Highness Prince Hassan of Jordan (center-left), Irina Bokova (center-right, Director-general of UNESCO), and Dr. Zafra M. Lerman (right, President of the Malta Conferences Foundation). (Photo by Cynthia Warren Mentz)

In addition to developing innovative methods of teaching science through the arts, Lerman started using science to promote peace and human rights around the globe. In 1986 she was named chair of the American Chemical Society's Subcommittee on Scientific Freedom and Human Rights. Among other activities, this group's mission included helping scientists who, for political reasons, were jailed, abused, and sentenced to execution. She held that position for 25 years.

Starting in 2001, Lerman began working to develop a scientific conference that would bring together researchers from many different, often mutually hostile, nations in the Middle East so they could cooperatively work toward solving problems facing the region. With support from the American Chemical Society (ACS), International Union of Pure and Applied Chemistry (IUPAC), the Royal Society of Chemistry (RSC - England), and the Gesellschaft Deutscher Chemiker, the first conference was held on the island of Malta from December 6 to 11, 2003. Attendees included six Nobel Laureates and scientists from 15 Middle Eastern Countries (Bahrain, Egypt, Iran, Iraq, Israel, Jordan, Kuwait, Lebanon, Libya, Palestinian Authority, Qatar, Saudi Arabia, Syria, Turkey, and United Arab Emirates). The conference included workshops to foster cross-border collaborations on air and water quality, science education for all, and green energy.

The organizers followed up by hosting a second meeting two years later, Malta II.

The meeting was honored by United States Senator Dick Durbin in a speech on the floor of the U.S. Senate entitled "Chemists Working Cooperatively".

Lerman led the initiative to continue with the conferences and founded the Malta Conferences Foundation to support them. She secured the support of UNESCO, the United Nations Educational, Scientific, and Cultural Organization.

List of Malta Conferences

2003	Malta I	Malta
2005	Malta II	Malta
2007	Malta III	Istanbul, Turkey
2009	Malta IV	Amman, Jordan
2011	Malta V	Paris, France
2013	Malta VI	Malta
2015	Malta VII	Rabat, Morocco
2017	Malta VIII	Malta
2019	Malta IX	Malta
2022	Malta X	Malta

== Notable awards and honors ==
Year	Honor	Institution
1997	Public Affairs Award	American Chemical Society - Chicago Section
1998	Kilby Laureate Awards	The Kilby International Awards Foundation
1999	Presidential Award for Excellence in Science, Mathematics and Engineering Mentoring	President of the United States (Bill Clinton)
2000	Joseph Hyman Ethics Award	American Institute of Chemists
2000	José Vasconcelos World Award of Education	World Cultural Council
2001	AAAS Fellow	American Association for the Advancement of Science
2002	James Flack Norris Award	American Chemical Society–Northeastern Section
2003	Charles Lathrop Parsons Award	American Chemical Society
2004	Heuer Award for Outstanding Achievement in Undergraduate Science Education	Council of Independent Colleges
2005	Heinz R. Pagels Human Rights Award	New York Academy of Sciences
2005	Recognition on International Human Rights Day	American Association for the Advancement of Science
2007	George Brown Award for International Scientific Cooperation	U.S. Civilian Research & Development Foundation Global (CRDF Global)
2010	George C. Pimentel Award in Chemical Education	American Chemical Society
2010	ACS Fellow	American Chemical Society`
2011	Award for Stimulating Collaborations and Ensuring Human Rights	The International Conference on Chemistry for Mankind (India)
2013	Recognition in U.S. Congress	Hon. Jan Schakowsky, Representative
2015	Award for Science Diplomacy	American Association for the Advancement of Science
2016	Andrei Sakharov Prize	American Physical Society
2016	Peace and Justice Award	UN NOVUS Summit
2017	Distinguished Women in Chemistry or Chemical Engineering Award	International Union of Pure and Applied Chemistry (IUPAC)
2018	Two Nobel Peace Prize Nominations	Nominators: member of the US Congress; member of the French parliament
2019	Two Nobel Peace Prize Nominations	Nominators: member of the US Congress; member of the French parliament
2020	Three Nobel Peace Prize Nominations	Nominators: member of the US Congress; member of the French parliament; Prof. of History
2021	Two Nobel Peace Prize Nominations	Nominators: member of the US Congress; member of the French parliament
2023	Two Nobel Peace Prize Nominations	Nominators: member of the US Congress; member of the French parliament
2025	Nobel Peace Prize Nomination	Nominator: member of the US Congress
2025	International Advocate for Peace Award	Cardozo School of Law

== Books ==
Lerman, Zafra (2024). Human Rights and Peace: A Personal Odyssey. Jenny Stanford Publishing. ISBN 9789815129243

== Selected publications ==
Year	Title	First Author	Citation
1964	Temperature dependence of the secondary isotope effect in aqueous alkaline ester hydrolysis.	Halevi, E. A.	Proc. Chem. Soc., London (1964), p. 174.
2003	ACS Delegation Travels to Cuba	Hofman, M.	The Chemical Bulletin, 90, 4, 8, American Chemical Society, 2003
2003	From the Outreach Front! IAC Conference in Cuba	Lerman, Zafra M.	J. Chem. Educ., 80 (4), 383, 2003.
2003	Citizen Chemists (book review of Claude, R. P.: Science in the Service of Human Rights).	Lerman, Zafra M.	Chemical and Engineering News, 87 (21), 42-43, 2003
2003	Using the Arts to Make Chemistry Accessible to Everybody	Lerman, Zafra M.	Journal of Chemical Education (2003), vol. 80 (11), pp 1234-1243
2005	Chemistry: An Inspiration for Theater and Dance	Lerman, Zafra M.	Chemical Education International (2005) vol. 6, p.1
2006	Frontiers of Chemical Sciences II: Research and Education in the Middle East	Lerman, Zafra M.	Chemistry in Israel - Bulletin of the Israel Chemical Society, (2006) vol. 21, pp. 21–23
2009	Chemistry and chemical education as a bridge to peace	Lerman, Zafra M.	In Chemistry Education in the ICT Age, Gupta-Bhowon, M.; Jhaumeer-Laulloo, S.; Li Kam Wah, H.; Ramasami, P. (Eds.)
2013	Human Rights, Education, and Peace: A Personal Odyssey	Lerman, Zafra M.	Journal of Chemical Education (2013), vol. 90 (1), pp 5–9
2014	The Malta Conferences, Frontiers of Science: Research and Education in the Middle East	Lerman, Zafra M.	Forum on International Physics. American Physical Society. pp 19– 21. 2014.
2014	Research and Education in the Middle East	Lerman, Zafra M.	Chemistry International.(36)3. pp 6, 27- 29. 2014.
2014	The Challenges for Chemistry Education in Africa	Lerman, Zafra M.	African Journal of Chemical Education (AJCE),4 (2), pp 80–90. 2014.
2015	Science Offers A Whole New Diplomacy	Lerman, Zafra M.	TWAS Newsletter, Vol. 27 No. 1, 2015, p. 23
2015	From Fighting for Human Rights to Building a Bridge to Peace: A Scientist’s Role and Responsibility	Lerman, Zafra M.	Science & Diplomacy (AAAS), 4 (1), pp 1–7. 2015.
2015	The Malta Conferences: Fostering International Scientific Collaborations Toward Peace in the Middle East.	Hoffman, Morton Z Lerman, Zafra M.	Jobs, Collaborations, and Women Leaders in the Global Chemistry Enterprise; Wu, M.L.; Cheng, H.N.; Miller, B., Eds., American Chemical Society, Washington, DC
2015	From Building Roads To Building Peace: A Woman Chemist’s Odyssey.	Lerman, Zafra M.	Jobs, Collaborations, and Women Leaders in the Global Chemistry Enterprise; Wu, M.L.; Cheng, H.N.; Miller, B., Eds., American Chemical Society, Washington, DC
2018	A Chain Reaction for Peace.	Lerman, Z.M., Margolin, B.	Guest editorial in Chemistry and Engineering News. 2018, 96 (4), pp. 2.
2018	Resolution on the Water Crisis in Gaza	Lerman, Z.M.	Chemistry International, 2018 (40), 2, 32.
2018	Education, Human Rights, and Peace – Contributions to the Progress of Humanity	Zafra Margolin Lerman	Pure and Applied Chemistry, 91(2), pp. 351–360.
2020	Chemistry for Peace.	Z.M. Lerman, E.R. Zajdela.	Chem. Eng. News, March 16, 2020, 98 (10), p. 2.
2021	Malta X Anniversary and COVID-19	E.R. Zajdela, Z.M. Lerman.	Chemistry International, vol. 43, no. 2, pp. 16–19.
2021	Science Education is a Human Right that Belongs to All.	Lerman, Z.	Iraqi Academy Journal Vol 1 Issue 0 No 10. 97 – 102
2022	Keep Up the Fight for Scientists’ Human Rights.	Lerman, Z.	Nature Reviews Materials.
2023	Malta Conferences Foundation, 10th Anniversary Conference: “Knowledge and Society” – MALTA X focus.	Shevah. Y, Hogue. L, O’Brien. C, Lerman. Z.	Chemistry International, 45 (2), pp. 44–48.
