= Jacques-Émile Dubois =

French chemist (1920–2005)

Jacques-Émile Dubois (13 April 1920 – 2 April 2005) was a French chemist.

In 1981, Dubois became a founding member of the World Cultural Council.
