= Walter Giger =

Swiss chemist (1943–2025)

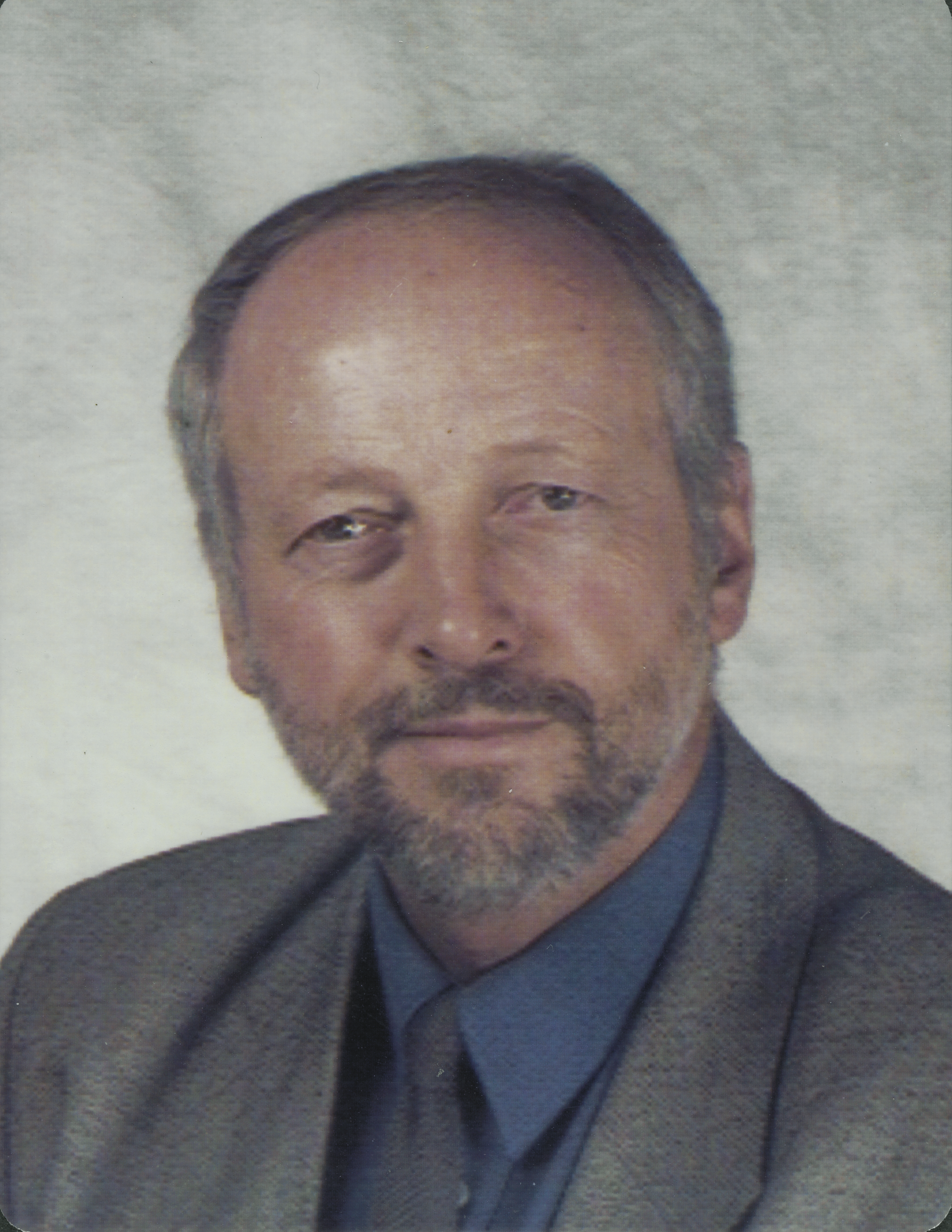
Walter Giger (1997)

Walter Giger (6 September 1943 – 6 November 2025) was a Swiss chemist. He worked at the Swiss Federal Institute of Aquatic Science and Technology (Eawag), where he was the head of the division Chemische Problemstoffe. He was a professor for environmental chemistry at the ETH Zurich from 1995.

Giger was a pioneer who advanced the field of trace organic analysis and its application to significant environmental problems. His research topics included development of analytical techniques for identification of organic pollutants in drinking water, wastewater and natural waters. He investigated their sources, occurrence and fate. In 1984, he discovered that in wastewater treatment plants nonylphenol ethoxylates are transformed to 4-nonylphenols, which are toxic to aquatic life. After several additional studies the use of nonylphenols and nonylphenol ethoxylates was restricted in the European Union in 2003.

== Life and career ==
Giger was born in Zurich on 6 September 1943. He received his PhD in chemistry from ETH Zurich in 1971. In 1972, he was a Postdoc at the Woods Hole Oceanographic Institution. In the same year, he took a new place of employment at the Eawag in Dübendorf and stayed there till his retirement. In the meantime, he was visiting scientist at the Stanford University and lecturer at the University of Karlsruhe (TH). In 2002, he became a member of the ISI Highly Cited Researchers Database.

In September 2008, the journal Environmental Science & Technology dedicated a special issue to him.

Giger died on 6 November 2025, at the age of 82.

== Literature ==
- Naomi Lubick: "Scaling Peaks: The Life and Science of Walter Giger". Environmental Science & Technology, 42(17), 2008, doi:10.1021/es8018989
