= Albert Einstein World Award of Science =

Annual award

- Awarded for: Recognition and encouragement for scientific and technological research and development.
- Country: Mexico
- Presented by: World Cultural Council
- Rewards: Diploma, Commemorative Medal and US$10,000
- First award: 1984
- Website: World Cultural Council

The Albert Einstein World Award for Science is an annual award given by the World Cultural Council "as a means of recognition and encouragement for scientific and technological research and development", with special consideration for researches which "have brought true benefit and wellbeing to mankind". Named for physicist and theoretician Albert Einstein, the award includes a diploma, a commemorative medal, and US$10,000.

The recipient of the award is evaluated and elected by an Interdisciplinary Committee, which is composed of world-renowned scientists, among them 25 Nobel laureates.

== Award recipients ==
Year	Recipient	Recipient's Institution	Field of Research	Ceremony Host	Ceremony Site	Ceremony Host Country	Ceremony Date	Ref.
2024	Eske Willerslev						2024	
2023	Christoph Gerber						2023	
2022	Victoria Kaspi	McGill University	Astrophysics	University of Coimbra	University of Coimbra, Lisbon	Portugal	29 November 2022	
2019	Zhong Lin Wang	Georgia Institute of Technology	Nanoenergy	University of Tsukuba	University of Tsukuba, Tsukuba	Japan	4 October 2019	
2018	Jean-Pierre Changeux	Pasteur Institute	Neuroscience	City University of Hong Kong	City University of Hong Kong, Hong Kong	China	8 November 2018	
2017	Omar M. Yaghi	University of California, Berkeley	Chemistry	Leiden University	Pieterskerk, Leiden	Netherlands	8 November 2017	
2016	Edward Witten	Princeton University	Physics, Mathematics	Riga Technical University	National Library of Latvia, Riga, Latvia	Latvia	14 October 2016	
2015	Ewine van Dishoeck	Leiden University	Astrophysics	University of Dundee	Caird Hall, Dundee, Scotland	United Kingdom	19 November 2015	
2014	Philip Cohen	University of Dundee	Enzymology	Aalto University	Otakaari 1 Building, Aalto University, Espoo	Finland	17 November 2014	
2013	Paul Nurse	Rockefeller University	Genetics	Nanyang Technological University	Nanyang Auditorium, Nanyang Technological University, Singapore	Singapore	2 October 2013	
2012	Michael Grätzel	École Polytechnique Fédérale de Lausanne	Solar energy	Aarhus University	The Main Hall, Aarhus University, Aarhus	Denmark	18 April 2012	
2011	Geoffrey Ozin	University of Toronto	Nanochemistry	University of Tartu	Assembly Hall, University of Tartu, Tartu	Estonia	10 November 2011	
2010	Julio Montaner	British Columbia Center for Excellence in HIV/AIDS	Biomedicine	Universidad Autónoma del Estado de México	Aula Magna Adolfo López Mateos, UAEM, Toluca	Mexico	8 December 2010	
2009	John T. Houghton	John Ray Initiative	Environmental Research	University of Liège	Salle Académique, University of Liège, Liège	Belgium	25 November 2009	
2008	Ada Yonath	Weizmann Institute of Science	Crystallography	Princeton University	Richardson Auditorium, Alexander Hall, Princeton University, Princeton, New Jersey	United States	11 November 2008	
2007	J. Fraser Stoddart	University of California, Los Angeles	Chemistry and Molecular Nanotechnology	Universidad Autónoma de Nuevo León	Teatro Universitario, Campus Mederos, Monterrey	Mexico	24 November 2007	
2006	Ahmed Zewail	California Institute of Technology	Femtochemistry	Instituto Politécnico Nacional	Sala Manuel M. Ponce, Palacio de Bellas Artes, Mexico City	Mexico	28 October 2006	
2005	John Hopfield	Princeton University	Life Sciences	Universidad Autónoma Agraria Antonio Narro	Teatro de la Ciudad Fernando Soler, Saltillo	Mexico	12 November 2005	
2004	Ralph J. Cicerone	University of California, Irvine	Atmospheric Chemistry	University of Liège	Amphithéâtres de l'Europe, University of Liège, Liège	Belgium	8 November 2004	
2003	Martin Rees	Cambridge University	Astrophysics	University of Helsinki, Finnish Society of Sciences and Letters	National Library of Finland, University of Helsinki, Helsinki	Finland	17 November 2003	
2002	Daniel H. Janzen	University of Pennsylvania	Biology	Trinity College Dublin	Examination Hall, Trinity College Dublin, Dublin	Ireland	14 November 2002	
2001	Niels Birbaumer	University of Vienna	Neurobiology	Utrecht University	nl:Academiegebouw (Utrecht), Utrecht	Netherlands	21 November 2001	
2000	Frank Fenner	Australian National University	Biology	University of the Witwatersrand	Great Hall, University of the Witwatersrand, Johannesburg	South Africa	1 November 2000	
1999	Robert Weinberg	Massachusetts Institute of Technology	Medical Sciences	Norwegian University of Science and Technology	Main Building, Norwegian University of Science and Technology, Trondheim	Norway	11 November 1999	
1998	Charles R. Goldman	University of California, Davis	Environmental Sciences	Victoria University of Wellington	Hunter Building, Wellington	New Zealand	19 November 1998	
1997	Jean-Marie Ghuysen	University of Liège	Biochemistry	Chulalongkorn University	Main Auditorium, Chulalongkorn University, Bangkok	Thailand	12 November 1997	
1996	Alec Jeffreys	University of Leicester	Molecular Biology	University of Oxford	Voltaire Room, Taylor Institution, Oxford	United Kingdom	23 November 1996	
1995	Herbert H. Jasper	University of Montreal	Brain Research	INBA, CONACULTA	Palacio de Bellas Artes, Mexico City	Mexico	16 December 1995	
1994	Sherwood Rowland	University of California, Irvine	Environmental Sciences	CODATA, ICSU, UNESCO	Le Manège Convention Center, Chambéry	France	19 September 1994	
1993	Ali Javan	Massachusetts Institute of Technology	Optical Physics	Presidencia de la República	Palacio de Bellas Artes, Mexico City	Mexico	19 December 1993	
1992	Raymond U. Lemieux	University of Alberta	Organic Chemistry	National Research Council (Canada)	Lester B. Pearson Building, Ottawa	Canada	1992	
1991	Albrecht Fleckenstein	University of Freiburg	Physiology	Australian National University	Chancellor's Building, ANU, Canberra	Australia	1991	
1990	Gustav Nossal	Walter and Eliza Hall Institute of Medical Research	Immunology	Eidgenössische Technische Hochschule Zürich	Cupola Room, ETH Zurich, Zurich	Switzerland	1990	
1989	Martin Kamen	University of Southern California	Biochemistry	Massachusetts Institute of Technology	Edgerton Hall, MIT, Cambridge	United States	8 November 1989	
1988	Margaret Burbidge	University of California, San Diego	Astrophysics	Instituto Politécnico Nacional	Palacio de Bellas Artes, Mexico City	Mexico	19 November 1988	
1987	Hugh Huxley	Brandeis University	Molecular Biology	University of Heidelberg	de:Aula der Alten Universität (Heidelberg), University of Heidelberg, Heidelberg	Germany	26 November 1987	
1986	Monkombu Sambasivan Swaminathan	International Rice Research Institute	Agriculture	University of Guadalajara	Teatro Degollado, Guadalajara	Mexico	6 November 1986	
1985	Werner Stumm	Swiss Federal Institute of Aquatic Science and Technology	Environmental Sciences	Royal Institute of Technology	Kollegiesalen, Stockholm	Sweden	21 November 1985	
1984	Ricardo Bressani	Institute of Nutrition of Central America and Panama (INCAP)	Nutrition	World Cultural Council	Auditorio San Pedro, San Pedro Garza García	Mexico	29 November 1984	

== See also ==
- Leonardo da Vinci World Award of Arts
- José Vasconcelos World Award of Education
- Albert Einstein Medal
- Albert Einstein Award
- Prizes named after people
- List of things named after Albert Einstein
- List of physics awards
- List of general science and technology awards
