= Hermann Rahn =

American physiologist (1912-1990)

- Born: July 5, 1912
- Died: June 23, 1990 (aged 77)
- Education: Cornell University, University of Rochester (PhD 1938)
- Known for: A Graphical Analysis of the Respiratory Gas Exchange
- Scientific career
- Fields: Physiology
- Institutions: University of Rochester, University at Buffalo

Hermann Rahn (July 5, 1912 – June 23, 1990) was an early leader in the field of environmental physiology. He graduated from Cornell University in 1933. Starting out in the field of zoology with a PhD from University of Rochester (1938), Rahn began teaching physiology at the University of Rochester in 1941. It was there that he partnered with Wallace O. Fenn to publish A Graphical Analysis of the Respiratory Gas Exchange in 1955. This paper included the landmark O_{2}-CO_{2} diagram, which formed basis for much of Rahn's future work. Rahn's research into applications of this diagram lead to the development of aerospace medicine and advancements in hyperbaric breathing and high-altitude respiration.

Rahn later joined the University at Buffalo in 1956 as the Lawrence D. Bell Professor and chairman of the Department of Physiology. As chairman, Rahn surrounded himself with outstanding faculty and made the university an international research center in environmental physiology. He was elected to the American Academy of Arts and Sciences in 1966 and the National Academy of Sciences in 1968. He served as the President of the American Physiological Society from 1963 to 1964.

In 1981, Hermann Rahn became a founding member of the World Cultural Council.
