= Zhong Lin Wang =

Chinese-American physicist

- 王中林
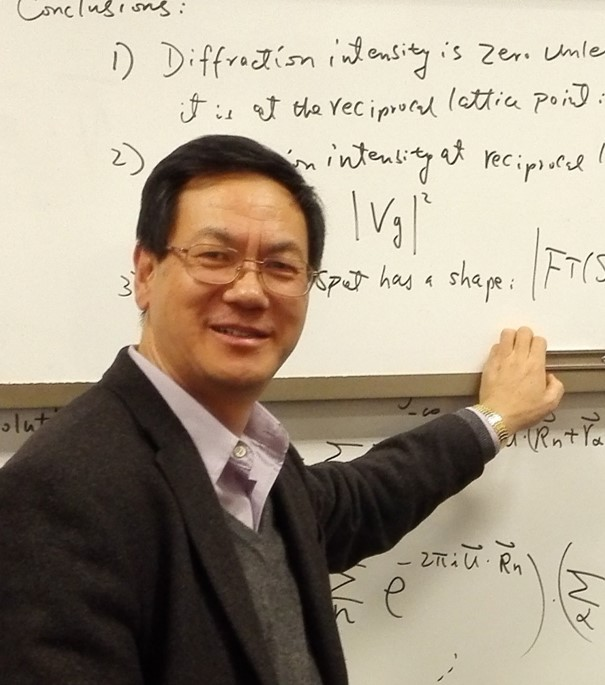
- Wang in 2022
- Born: November 1961 (age 64–65); Pucheng County, Weinan, Shaanxi, China
- Education: Arizona State University; Xidian University
- Awards: Albert Einstein World Award of Science (2019), ENI award in Energy Frontiers (2018), Thomson Reuters Citation Laureates in Physics (2015)
- Scientific career
- Fields: Physics; Materials Science and Engineering; Nanoscience and technology Energy and sensors
- Workplaces: Georgia Institute of Technology; Beijing Institute of Nanoenergy and Nanosystems
- Website: www.mse.gatech.edu/people/zhong-lin-wang

Zhong Lin Wang (Chinese: 王中林; pinyin: Wáng Zhōnglín; born November 1961) is a Chinese-American physicist, materials scientist and engineer specialized in nanotechnology, energy science and electronics. He was awarded the Albert Einstein World Award of Science in 2019, and has been called the 'father of nanogenerators'.

He received his PhD from Arizona State University in 1987. He was the Hightower Chair in Materials Science and Engineering and Regents' Professor Chair Emeritus at the Georgia Institute of Technology, US. In 2024, it was reported that Wang had moved to work in China full-time at the Beijing Institute of Nanoenergy and Nanosystems. It was speculated that this was due to US government persecution of Chinese-American scientists through the China Initiative.

== Education ==
- Ph.D. in physics, Arizona State University, 1987
- B.S. in Applied Physics, Xidian University, Xi'an, China, 1982

He came to the US for graduate school through CUSPEA program organized by Tsung-Dao Lee.

== Career ==
Wang was a visiting Lecturer at Stony Brook University from 1987 to 1988. After working as a research fellow in the following year at Cavendish Laboratory in the University of Cambridge, Wang joined Oak Ridge National Laboratory and the National Institute of Standards and Technology as a research scientist from 1990 to 1994. He was hired by Georgia Institute of Technology as an associate professor in 1995; he was promoted to full Professor in 1999, Regents' professor in 2004, and the Hightower Chair in Materials Science and Engineering in 2010. Wang was the Director of the Georgia Tech's Center for Nanostructure Characterization from 2000 to 2015. He is the Founding Director, Director, and Chief Scientist at Beijing Institute of Nanoenergy and Nanosystems, Chinese Academy of Sciences since 2012.

=== Science and technology of nanogenerators ===
Wang worked on piezoelectric nanogenerators in 2006, for generating electricity from mechanical energy using ZnO nanowire arrays.

Before the invention of triboelectric nanogenerators (TENGs) by Wang in 2011, mechanical energy harvesting mainly relied on the electromagnetic generator (EMG) invented by Faraday in 1831. The EMG is most efficient for high-frequency mechanical motions, such as more than 10–60 Hz. The TENGs have advantages over EMG in harvesting low-frequency mechanical energy from the environment. The energy conversion efficiency based on TENG can reach 50-85%. The maximum output power density obtained so far is up to 500 W/m^{2}.

Hybrid cell. Wang introduced the hybrid cell in 2009 for simultaneously harvesting two or more different types of energy, such as solar and mechanical energy.

Pyroelectric nanogenerator. In 2012, based on the pyroelectric effect, Wang invented the pyroelectric nanogenerator.

Blue energy. In 2014, Wang proposed the idea of blue energy, in which using millions of TENG units to form a TENG network floating on water surface for large-scale wave energy harvesting. If one TENG unit can generate a power of 10 mW, the total power for the area equal to the size of Georgia state and 10 m depth of water is theoretically predicted to be 16 TW, which can meet the energy needs of the world.

Theory of nanogenerators from the Maxwell's displacement current. In 1861, Maxwell proposed the term ε𝜕𝑬/𝜕𝑡 as the Maxwell's displacement current. Wang suggested adding an additional term 𝜕𝑃𝑠/𝜕𝑡 into the Maxwell's displacement current for the cases when the surface polarization is present. Recently, Wang has proposed expanding Maxwell's equations for moving charged media.

Origins of contact electrification. Wang has argued that electron transfer between atoms/molecules in contact electrification is due to electron cloud overlap (or wave function overlap) between the repulsive region, because interatomic potial barrier can be reduced. Then, a hybrid layer model has been proposed to reveal the formation process of electric double layer between liquid and solid. The photon emission due to interface electron transfer and transition has been observed, resulting in the birth of the contact-electrification induced emission spectroscopy (CEIIS). Furthermore, the electron transfer between liquid and solid surfaces can be used for contact-electro catalysis (CEC).

Energy for the new era and high entropy energy. Wang proposed the idea of "energy for the new era" in 2017 to distinguish the distributed energy sources from the well-known new energy. Recently, Wang studied the entropy theory of energy distribution and utilization for the era of internet of things. The "ordered" energy transmitted from power plants is used to solve the "ordered" applications for fixed sites and part of "disordered" distributed power applications, while the "disordered" energy harvested from the environment is mainly to solve distributed applications.

=== Piezotronics and piezo-phototronics of the third generation semiconductors ===
Piezotronic effect and piezotronics. When applying a stress on a material with a non-centrosymmetric crystal structure, a piezoelectric potential (piezopotential) can be produced. For a ZnO nanowire, the Schottky barrier height between the nanowire and its metal contact can be effectively tuned by the created internal field. Such phenomenon is called as the piezotronic effect, which was discovered by Wang in 2007. The field of piezotronics represents the electronics in which the piezopotential acts as a gate voltage. Recently, the piezotronic effect in 2D materials was also demonstrated.

Piezo-phototronic effect and piezo-phototronics. When applying a strain, the piezopotential created by interface polarization charges can greatly tune the local band structure and shift the charge depletion zone at a pn junction. The separation or recombination of charge carriers at the junction can be enhanced as excited by photon. Such phenomenon is called as the piezo-phototronic effect, discovered by Wang in 2009, in which the optoelectronic processes are tuned and controlled by the created piezopotential. By using this effect, the pressure/force sensor arrays based on individual-nanowire LED have been fabricated, which can map strain at a high resolution and density and enhance the efficiency of LED.

Piezophotonic effect. Wang theoretically predicted the piezoelectric-induced photon-emission effect (piezophotonic effect) in 2008. The photo emission can occur, resulting from the drop of trapped charges from the vacancy/surface states back to the valence band, under the existence of the piezoelectric potential. Such effect has been experimentally observed and verified in his later work.

Tribotronics. The field of tribotronics represents the electronics in which the triboelectric acts as a gate voltage.

=== Growth and understanding ZnO nanostructures ===
Wang discovered oxide nanobelts in 2001.

=== In-situ nanomeasurements in TEM ===
In 1999 Wang and co-workers used transmission electron microscopy (TEM) to measure the properties of individual carbon nanotubes, including the mechanical, electrical and field emission ones. Wang demonstrated a nanobalance technique and an approach toward nanomechanics.

=== Theory of inelastic scattering in electron diffraction and imaging ===
Wang did some research to understand inelastic scattering in electron diffraction and imaging. He published a textbook on Elastic and Inelastic Scattering in Electron Diffraction and Imaging (Plenum Press, 1995)^{[27]}. In scanning transmission electron microscopy (STEM), the high-angle annular dark-field (HAADF) (referred as Z-contrast) is dominated by the thermal diffuse scattering (TDS) and a dynamic theory for including TDS in image simulation of HAADF was proposed.

== Honors and recognition ==
- Asian Scientist 100, Asian Scientist, 2024
- Global Energy Prize, 2023
- Celsius Lecture Laureate, 2020, Sweden
- Albert Einstein World Award of Science, conferred by the World Cultural Council (2019)
- 2019 Diels-Planck lecture award
- 2018 ENI award in Energy Frontiers
- American Chemical Soc. Publication most prolific author (2017)
- Global Nanoenergy Prize (2017), The NANOSMAT Society, UK (2017)
- Distinguished Research Award, Pan Wen Yuan foundation (2017)
- Outstanding Achievement in Research Innovation award, Georgia Tech (2016)
- Distinguished Scientist Award from (US) Southeastern Universities Research Association (2016)
- Thomson-Reuters Citation Laureate in Physics (2015)
- Distinguished Professor Award (Highest faculty honor at Georgia Tech) (2014)
- NANOSMAT prize (United Kingdom) (2014)
- China International Science and Technology Collaboration Award (2014)
- World Technology Award (Materials) (2014)
- The James C. McGroddy Prize for New Materials from American Physical Society (2014)
- ACS Nano Lectureship (2013)
- Edward Orton Memorial Lecture Award, American Ceramic Society (2012)
- MRS Medal from Materials Research Society (2011)
- Foreign Member, Chinese Academy of Sciences (2009)
- Purdy award, American Ceramic Society (2009)
- John M. Cowley Distinguished Lecture, Arizona State University (2012)
- NanoTech Briefs, Top50 award (2005)
- Sigma Xi sustain research awards, Georgia Tech (2005)
- Georgia Tech faculty outstanding research author award (2004)
- S.T. Li Prize for Distinguished Achievement in Science and Technology (2001)
- Outstanding Research Author Award, Georgia Tech (2000)
- Burton Medal, Microscopy Society of America (1999)
