= Ralph Cicerone =

American academic administrator (1943–2016)

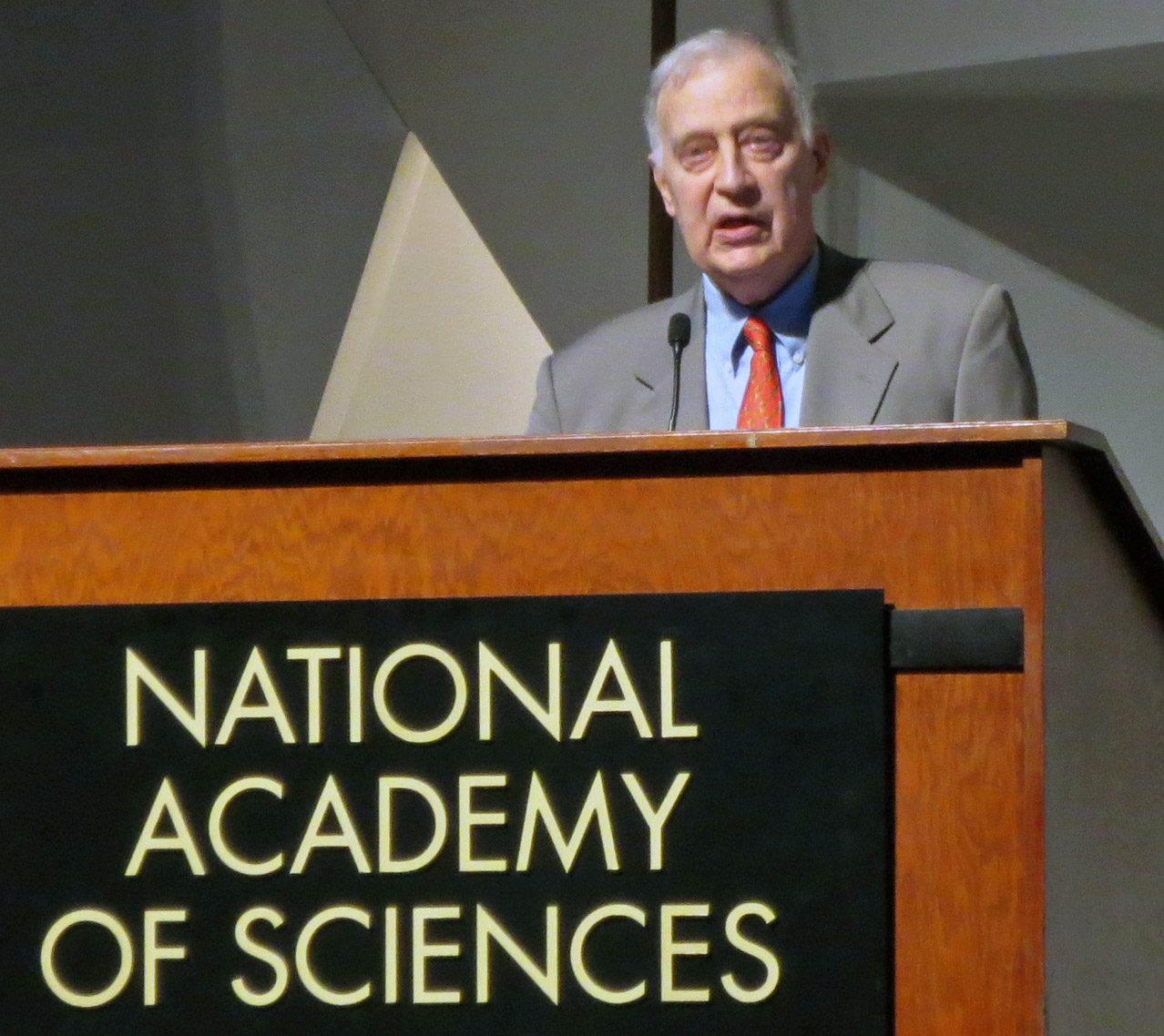
- Cicerone speaking at the NAS Building in 2013

21st President of the National Academy of Sciences
- In office July 1, 2005 – June 30, 2016
- Preceded by: Bruce Alberts
- Succeeded by: Marcia McNutt

4th Chancellor of the University of California, Irvine
- In office 1998 – 2005
- Preceded by: Laurel L. Wilkening
- Succeeded by: Michael V. Drake

Personal details
- Born: Ralph John Cicerone; May 2, 1943 New Castle, Pennsylvania, US
- Died: November 5, 2016 (aged 73) Short Hills, New Jersey, US
- Education: Massachusetts Institute of Technology; University of Illinois at Urbana–Champaign
- Scientific career
- Awards: Albert Einstein World Award of Science (2004)
- Workplaces: University of Michigan; Scripps Institution of Oceanography; National Center for Atmospheric Research; University of California, Irvine
- Thesis: Monte Carlo and Thomson-scatter plasma-line studies of ionospheric photoelectrons (1970)
- Doctoral advisor: S. A. Bowhill

Ralph John Cicerone (May 2, 1943 – November 5, 2016) was an American atmospheric scientist and administrator. From 1998 to 2005, he was the chancellor of the University of California, Irvine. From 2005 to 2016, he was the president of the National Academy of Sciences (NAS). He was a "renowned authority" on climate change and atmospheric chemistry, and issued an early warning about the grave potential risks of climate change.

== Early life and education ==
Cicerone was born in New Castle, Pennsylvania, on May 2, 1943, to Salvatore and Louise (Palus) Cicerone. His father, an insurance salesman, was the son of Italian immigrants.

Cicerone was the first in his family to attend college. He graduated from the Massachusetts Institute of Technology in 1965 with a Bachelor of Science degree in electrical engineering. He was captain of MIT's varsity baseball team. After college, he obtained a master's degree and doctorate from the University of Illinois.

== Career ==
Cicerone joined the University of Michigan as a research scientist, later holding faculty positions in electrical and computer engineering from 1971 to 1978. In 1978 he moved to the Scripps Institution of Oceanography at UC San Diego as a research chemist. He was appointed senior scientist and director of the Atmospheric Chemistry Division at the National Center for Atmospheric Research in Boulder, Colorado, in 1980. He held this position until 1989 when he joined the University of California, Irvine (UCI), as professor of earth system science (having founded the department) and chaired the Department of Earth System Science from 1989 to 1994, when he became Dean of Physical Sciences. Cicerone was recognized on the citation for the 1995 Nobel Prize in chemistry awarded to colleague F. Sherwood Rowland. In 1998 he became the fourth Chancellor of UCI. Ralph Cicerone held the position of Chancellor of UC Irvine until 2005, when he left to be President of the National Academy of Sciences. He retired as NAS President in June 2016.

In 2001, while chancellor of UCI, Cicerone led an academy panel, commissioned by George W. Bush, tasked with reporting to him on climate change. The panel concluded unequivocally that "greenhouse gases are accumulating in Earth's atmosphere as a result of human activities, causing surface air temperatures and subsurface ocean temperatures to rise."

Cicerone was a member of the USA Science and Engineering Festival's Advisory Board, a Foreign Member of the Royal Society, Academia Sinica, the American Academy of Arts and Sciences, the American Philosophical Society, the Accademia Nazionale dei Lincei, the Russian Academy of Sciences, the Korean Academy of Science and Technology. He also served as president of the American Geophysical Union, the world's largest society of earth scientists.

== Honors, awards and legacy ==
He was the 1999 laureate for the Bower Award and Prize for Achievement in Science. The American Geophysical Union awarded him its James B. Macelwane Medal in 1979 for outstanding contributions to geophysics by a young scientists and later in 2002 its Roger Revelle Medal for outstanding research contributions to the understanding of Earth's atmospheric processes, biogeochemical cycles, and other key elements of the climate system. The World Cultural Council honored him with the Albert Einstein World Award of Science in 2004.

Cicerone revived the baseball program at UC Irvine in 2002, while he was its chancellor. The baseball field at UC Irvine's Anteater Ballpark was named after Cicerone in 2009.

Ralph Cicerone and his wife Carol Cicerone endowed a graduate fellowship at UCI in 2009.

== Personal life ==
Cicerone was married to Carol M. (Ogata) Cicerone (a professor of cognitive sciences at the UCI during the Cicerone's time at the university) and had a daughter and two grandchildren.

He was an avid baseball fan who played varsity baseball during college at MIT.

Cicerone died unexpectedly at his home in the Short Hills section of Millburn, New Jersey on November 5, 2016.

Academic offices
| Preceded by Laurel L. Wilkening | 4th Chancellor of the University of California, Irvine; 1998–2005 | Succeeded by Michael V. Drake |
Professional and academic associations
| Preceded by Bruce Alberts | 21st President of the National Academy of Sciences; 2005–2016 | Succeeded by Marcia McNutt |
