= Laurel L. Wilkening =

Planetary scientist and university administrator (1944–2019)

3rd Chancellor of the University of California, Irvine
- In office 1993 – 1998
- Preceded by: Jack Peltason
- Succeeded by: Ralph Cicerone

Personal details
- Born: November 23, 1944 Richland, Washington
- Died: June 4, 2019 (aged 74) Arizona
- Occupation: Chemist, planetary scientist, professor, college administrator
- Known for: Chancellor, University of California, Irvine (1993-1998)
- Scientific career
- Education: Reed College; University of California, San Diego
- Fields: Planetary science
- Workplaces: University of Arizona; University of Washington
- Thesis: On the Early History of Meteorites: Evidence from Glasses, from Fossil Particle Tracks and from the Noble Gases (1970)
- Doctoral advisor: Hans Suess
- Other academic advisors: Harold Urey; Hannes Alfvén

Laurel L. Wilkening (November 23, 1944 – June 4, 2019) was an American planetary scientist and college professor. She was chancellor of the University of California, Irvine (UCI) from 1993 to 1998.

== Early life ==
Wilkening was born in Richland, Washington, and raised in Socorro, New Mexico. Her mother, Ruby Alma Barks Wilkening, was a teacher; her father, Marvin H. Wilkening, was an atomic scientist during World War II, and a physics professor at the New Mexico Institute of Mining and Technology. She earned a bachelor's degree in chemistry at Reed College in 1966. She completed doctoral studies in chemistry at the University of California, San Diego in 1970, under advisor Hans Suess. Her dissertation committee included two Nobel Prize laureates, Harold Urey and Hannes Alfvén. She held post-doctoral appointments in Mumbai, Mainz, Paris, and Chicago.

== Career ==
=== Planetary research and space policy ===
Wilkening's research focused on comets, meteorites, and Moon rocks. As a doctoral student, she studied Rock Number 17, one of the first lunar samples released from quarantine. She coedited a textbook, Comets (1982), with Mildred Shapley Matthews. Wilkening sat next to Jimmy Carter at the White House to watch the first images from the Voyager mission. She was vice-chair of the National Commission on Space, chair of the Space Policy Advisory Board, and vice-chair of the Advisory Committee on the Future of the U.S. Space Programs. She served on the board of The Planetary Society. In 2001, she recorded an oral history interview for the NASA Headquarters Oral History Project. Asteroid 75562 was named for Wilkening in 2013.

=== University work ===
Wilkening taught chemistry and planetary science at the University of Arizona beginning in 1973, and from 1981 was head of the Planetary Science department and director of the university's Lunar & Planetary Laboratory. She also served as the university's acting dean of sciences, and vice-president for research. While she was at Arizona, she helped to found the Women's Studies program, and made a statistical report on pay equity on the campus. She later gave over $100,000 to the university's Women's Plaza of Honor project.

From 1988 to 1993, she was provost at the University of Washington. In 1993, she became the third chancellor of the University of California, Irvine; she was also the third woman to hold the position of chancellor in the University of California system.

Wilkening retired from academic work in 1998, and ran a vineyard in Elgin, Arizona with her husband in her later years. In 2005, the University of California, Irvine dedicated the Laurel L. Wilkening Rose Garden on campus. In 2009, Wilkening received the UCI Medal.

== Personal life ==
Wilkening married fellow planetary chemist and former Carmelite friar, Godfrey T. Sill. She was widowed when Sill died in 2007. She died in 2019, aged 74 years, in Arizona. Some of her papers are in the University Archives at UCI.
