= Charles Tanford =

German biochemist (1921–2009)

- Born: Karl Tannenbaum; December 29, 1921; Halle, Germany
- Died: October 1, 2009 (aged 87); York, England
- Education: B.A. in Chemistry, New York University; PhD, Princeton University, New York University
- Known for: Hydrophobic effect
- Spouse: Lucia L. Brown (div. 1968)
- Partner: Jacqueline A. Reynolds
- Awards: Guggenheim fellowship, Alexander von Humboldt Foundation fellowship, Merck Award for Molecular Biology, distinguished Eastman Professorship at Oxford University; the Charles-Tanford-Proteinzentrum in his name at Halle (Saale), Germany
- Scientific career
- Fields: Biochemistry, protein chemistry
- Institutions: Oak Ridge, Tennessee (Manhattan Project), University of Iowa, Duke University

Charles Tanford (December 29, 1921 – October 1, 2009) was a German-born protein biochemist. He died in York, England, on October 1, 2009.

== Early life and education ==
Charles Tanford was born in Halle, Germany in 1921 to Majer and Charlotte Tannenbaum. His parents, who were Jewish, fled to England in 1929 anticipating the coming rule of the Nazi Party, and changed their name to Tanford. At the outbreak of war in Europe in 1939, Tanford was sent to New York to live with relatives. Despite Tanford's attempts to persuade them to leave, many of his relatives stayed behind in Germany and subsequently were murdered in the Holocaust. While in the United States, Tanford earned a B.A. in chemistry from New York University in 1943 and worked on the Manhattan Project in Oak Ridge.

In 1947, Tanford received his Ph.D. in Chemistry at Princeton University, working on combustion. He is credited with contributing to the "Tanford-Pease Theory of burning velocity". After graduating from Princeton, Tanford spent two years at Harvard University in the laboratory of E. J. Cohn and John Edsall, where he changed his research focus to protein biochemistry.

== Independent career ==
Tanford was hired as an assistant professor by the University of Iowa, where, in 1954, he was then promoted to associate professor and, again, in 1959, to full professor. In 1960, Tanford joined the faculty at Duke University as a professor of biochemistry. In 1970, he was named James B. Duke Professor of Biochemistry. He moved to the Department of Physiology in 1980, where his research efforts were concentrated on the movement of ions across cell membranes together with his collaborators Dr. E. A. Johnson and Dr. Jacqueline Reynolds.

In 1994 Tanford recalled, "I had been stimulated by Walter Kauzmann to move into protein chemistry and that made it logical that 'large molecules' should be my domain." His postdoctoral research was concerned with physical chemistry inspired by Kai Linderstrom-Lang. He wrote, "What I had been taught was the more elegant process of using equations: equations that linked thermodynamic properties, dielectric constant and dipole moment, binding equilibria, and a host of other possibilities to revealing molecular characteristics." His book on macromolecules, The Physical Chemistry of Macromolecules (1961) took ten years to write, and peer review "came only after submission of the final manuscript, and when it came it was a disaster. There were 2 reviewers and their criticism was scathing; I had got it all wrong, they said, and the book was declared effectively unpublishable...John Wiley & Sons reluctantly agreed to publish...the book was in fact a success..."

In 1973 Tanford published The Hydrophobic Effect, which covered proteins in all their various guises including those within cell membranes. Although he popularized the term hydrophobic effect, he attributed the origin of this concept to G. S. Hartley and the later efforts of Walter Kauzmann. Tanford gave great credit to the giants upon whose shoulders he stood.

Among other topics Tanford studied protein titration curves and protein denaturation, in both cases as applied to lysozyme. He also published important work on protein hydration and on the viscosity of solutions of proteins.

In 1981, Tanford became a founding member of the World Cultural Council.

Developing the theme of proteins as autonomous effectors, like robots, Charles and his partner Jacqueline Reynolds wrote Nature's Robots: A history of proteins, published by Oxford University Press in 2001.

Tanford retired in 1988 but remained James B. Duke Professor Emeritus in the Department of Cell Biology until his death in 2009.

== Honors ==
In recognition of his scientific contributions, he was elected to the National Academy of Sciences and the American Academy of Arts and Sciences. He was also awarded fellowships from the Guggenheim and Alexander von Humboldt Foundations (1984). He received the Merck Award for Molecular Biology. He was distinguished Eastman Professorship at Oxford.

On August 28, 2017, the Charles-Tanford-Proteinzentrum was opened in Halle (Saale), city of his birth, by Prof. Dr. Johanna Wanka, Federal Minister of Science and Education.

== Personal life ==
While at Harvard, he married Lucia L. Brown. They had three children, Vicki, Alex and Sarah. Charles was divorced in 1968, and soon thereafter began a professional and personal relationship with Dr. Jacqueline A. Reynolds, a fellow biochemist, that would last until his death. Dr. Reynolds and Tanford's blended family include Jackie's children, Tom Reynolds (d.2000), Ben Reynolds, Deborah Reynolds Jackson, and Rebecca Reynolds Newton.

He and Reynolds retired in 1988 to Easingwold, England, a remote Georgian market town in North Yorkshire. There, he began a second career writing about the history of science primarily for lay readers. He and Reynolds published two travel books A Travel Guide to the Scientific Sites of the British Isles: A Guide to the People, Places and Landmarks and The Scientific Traveler: a Guide to the People, Places and Institutions of Europe. They were also frequent contributors to the British scientific magazine Nature.

Throughout his life, Tanford was known for conversation, walking, wine, good food, travel, cricket, hiking, Switzerland, France, classical music, murder mysteries and birds.

Preceded by None	Honorary President of the World Cultural Council; 1984 – 1987	Succeeded by Werner Stumm
