= José Vasconcelos World Award of Education =

International award for educators

- Awarded for: Acknowledgment for exceptional teaching, which is the underlying basis of our present civilization.
- Country: Mexico
- Presented by: World Cultural Council
- Rewards: Diploma, Commemorative Medal, and US$10,000
- First award: 1985
- Website: consejoculturalmundial.org

The José Vasconcelos World Award of Education is granted by the World Cultural Council as a recognition to renowned educators, to experts in the field of teaching, and to legislators of education policies who have significant influence in enriching the culture of mankind. This award has been presented biennially since 1988.

The qualifying jury is formed by several members of the Interdisciplinary Committee of the World Cultural Council and a group of distinguished educators.

The World Award of Education grants a Diploma, a Commemorative medal, and US$10,000.

The award is named after José Vasconcelos.

== Award recipients ==
Year	Recipient	Recipient's Institution	Field of Research	Ceremony Host	Ceremony Site	Ceremony Host Country	Ceremony Date	Ref.
2022	Claudia Mitchell							
2018	Malik Mâaza	University of South Africa	Nanoscience, Nanotechnology	City University of Hong Kong	City University of Hong Kong	China	8 November 2018	
2016	Kalevi Ekman	Aalto University	Design Factory	Riga Technical University	National Library of Latvia, Riga, Latvia	Latvia	14 October 2016	
2014	Federico Rosei	INRS, University of Quebec		Aalto University	Otakaari 1 Building, Aalto University, Espoo	Finland	17 November 2014	
2012	Hans Ulrich Gumbrecht	Stanford University	Literature, Philosophy	Aarhus University	The Main Hall, Aarhus University, Aarhus	Denmark	18 April 2012	
2010	Christian Azar	Chalmers University of Technology	Environmental education	Universidad Autónoma del Estado de México	Aula Magna Adolfo López Mateos, UAEM, Toluca	Mexico	8 December 2010	
2008	William G. Bowen	Princeton University	Higher education	Princeton University	Richardson Auditorium, Alexander Hall, Princeton University, Princeton, New Jersey	United States	11 November 2008	
2006	Marlene Scardamalia	University of Toronto	Social Education	Instituto Politécnico Nacional	Sala Manuel M. Ponce, Palacio de Bellas Artes, Mexico City	Mexico	28 October 2006	
2004	David Attenborough	BBC	Educational Broadcasting	University of Liège	Amphithéâtres de l'Europe, University of Liège, Liège	Belgium	8 November 2004	
2002	Jeannie Oakes	University of California, Los Angeles	Science Education	Trinity College, Dublin	Examination Hall, Trinity College, Dublin, Dublin	(Republic of Ireland) Ireland	14 November 2002	
2000	Zafra M. Lerman	Columbia College Chicago	Science Education	University of the Witwatersrand	Great Hall, University of the Witwatersrand, Johannesburg	South Africa	1 November 2000	
1998	Robert Yager	University of Iowa	Science Education	Victoria University of Wellington	Hunter Building, Wellington	New Zealand	19 November 1998	
1996	Roger Gaudry	University of Montreal	Education Administration	University of Oxford	Voltaire Room, Taylor Institution, Oxford	United Kingdom	23 November 1996	
1994	Joseph O´Halloran	Canberra University	Mathematical Pedagogy	CODATA, ICSU, UNESCO	Le Manège Convention Center, Chambéry	France	19 September 1994	
1992	Elliot Eisner	Stanford University	Art Education	National Research Council (Canada)	Lester B. Pearson Building, Ottawa	Canada	1992	
1990	Lev Shevrin	Ural State University	Pedagogy, Children's Mathematics Education	Eidgenössische Technische Hochschule Zürich	Cupola Room, ETH Zürich, Zürich	Switzerland	1990	
1988	Gilbert De Landsheere	University of Liège	Empirical Education, Teacher Education	Instituto Politécnico Nacional	Palacio de Bellas Artes, Mexico City	Mexico	19 November 1988	
1985	Dolores Hernandez	University of the Philippines Diliman	Mathematics education and Science education	Royal Institute of Technology	Kollegiesalen, Stockholm	Sweden	21 November 1985	

== See also ==
- World Cultural Council
- Albert Einstein World Award of Science
- Leonardo da Vinci World Award of Arts
- José Vasconcelos
- Prizes named after people
- List of education awards
