= Albrecht Fleckenstein =

German pharmacologist and physiologist

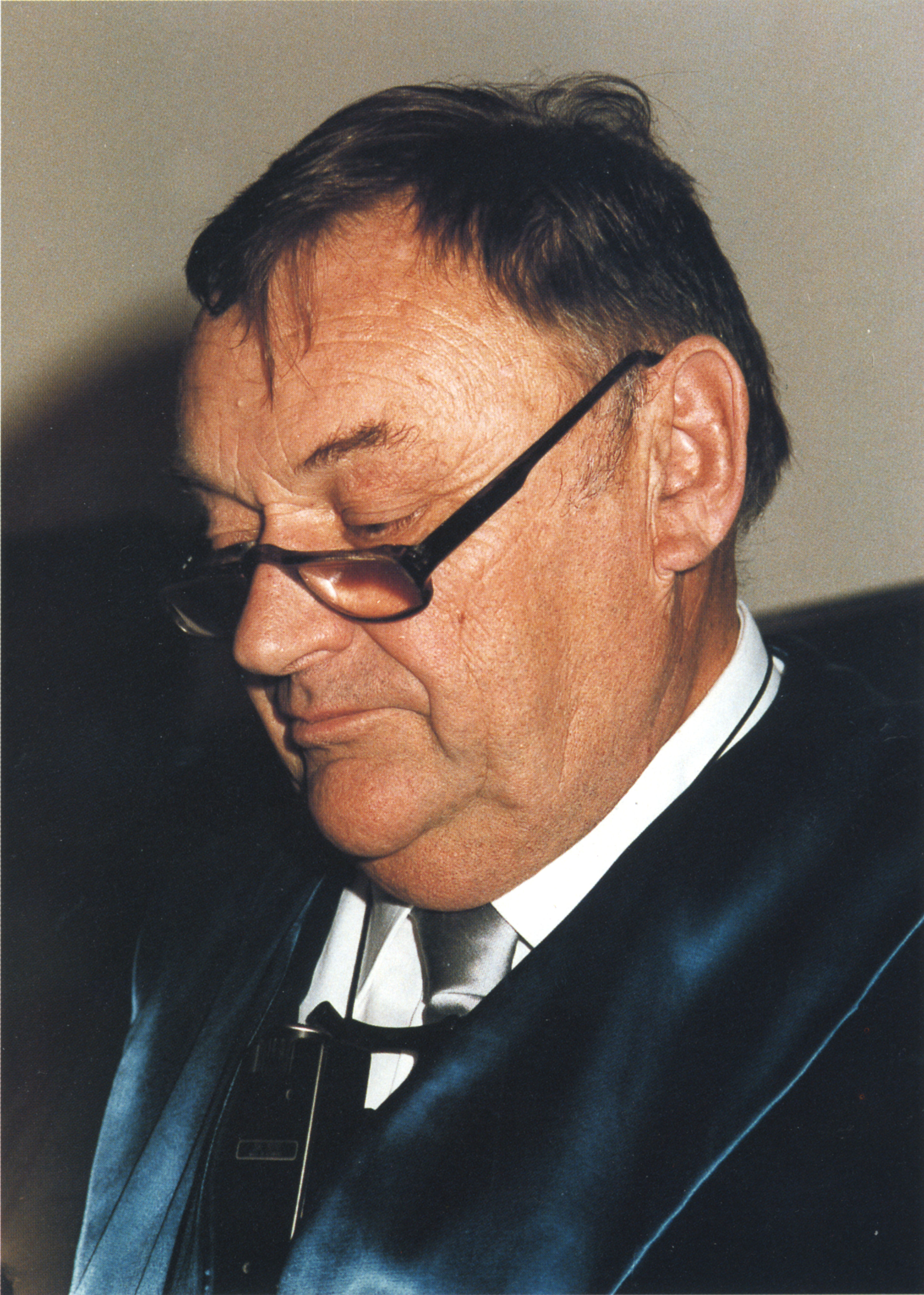
Albrecht Fleckenstein

Albrecht Fleckenstein (3 March 1917 – 4 April 1992) was a German pharmacologist and physiologist best known for his discovery of calcium channel blockers.

== Life and career ==
Albrecht Fleckenstein was born on 3 March 1917 in Aschaffenburg, Germany. He received his medical training in Würzburg and Vienna. In 1964, Fleckenstein reported on the inhibitory actions of prenylamine and verapamil on the physiological process of excitation–contraction coupling. This contributed to his discovery of calcium antagonists.

== Awards ==
In 1986, Fleckenstein received the Ernst Jung Prize, awarded annually for excellence in biomedical sciences. In 1991, he also received the Albert Einstein World Award of Science.
