= Herbert Jasper =

Canadian psychologist and physiologist

Herbert Henri Jasper OC GOQ FRSC (July 27, 1906 – March 11, 1999) was a Canadian psychologist, physiologist, neurologist, and epileptologist.

Born in La Grande, Oregon, he attended Reed College in Portland, Oregon and received his PhD in psychology from the University of Iowa in 1931 and earned a Doctor of Science degree from the University of Paris for research in neurobiology.

From 1946 to 1964 he was professor of experimental neurology at the Montreal Neurological Institute, McGill University and then from 1965 to 1976 he was professor of neurophysiology, Université de Montréal. He did his most important research with Wilder Penfield at McGill University. He was a member of the American Academy of Neurology and the American Association for the Advancement of Science. He was also a member of the Canadian Neurological Society and the Royal Society of Medicine. He wrote more than 350 scientific publications.

== Honours ==
- In 1972 he was made an Officer of the Order of Canada.
- In 1981 he was awarded the Ralph W. Gerard Prize in Neuroscience.
- In 1982 he was awarded the Karl Spencer Lashley Award.
- In 1985 he was awarded the McLaughlin Medal by the Royal Society of Canada.
- In 1995 he was inducted into the Canadian Medical Hall of Fame.
- In 1995 he received the Albert Einstein World Award of Science
- In 1996 he was made a Grand Officer of the National Order of Quebec.
