= Jean-Marie De Ketele =

Belgian pedagogue (born 1943)

Jean-Marie De Ketele (born 15 August 1943) is a Belgian academic and writer specialising in education. In addition to academia, he has held positions for United Nations agencies.

== Education and teaching career ==
De Ketele studied general, technical and professional education from 1964 to 1967 and earned degrees in psychology in 1972 and in education in 1973, both from the University of Louvain (UCLouvain). In 1977 he received a doctoral degree with a speciality in observation and evaluation. In 1991 he became an ordinary professor at UCLouvain, where he is now professor emeritus. In 1994, he was appointed to the UNESCO chair in education sciences at Cheikh Anta Diop University in Dakar, which he assisted in establishing; he spent 16 years in Senegal. He has also been a visiting professor at Paris West University Nanterre La Défense, at the Faculty of Medicine at Paris 13 University, at Pierre Mendès-France University in Grenoble and at the University of Fribourg.

== Non-teaching activities ==
De Ketele has served as a permanent consultant to UNICEF, a consultant to UNESCO, and a scientific consultant to the French Institut de Recherche sur l'Éducation.

He has lent his expertise to educational issues in several foreign countries, including evaluation of educational methodology in 39 countries under the umbrella of Agence de Coopération Culturelle et Technique and research on education in the European Union, in particular in Belgium, France, Spain, Italy, Luxembourg, Switzerland and Portugal. He is the European editor of the journal Mesure et Evaluation en Education, president of the European section of ADMEE (Association pour le Développement des Méthodologies de l'Évaluation en Éducation / Association for the Development of Methodologies of Evaluation in Education) and founding president of the Bureau d'Ingénierie en Éducation et en Formation (BIEF).

== Publications ==
De Ketele has published 26 books and 90 articles, and is also supervising editor at Éditions De Boeck-Wesmael of the series: Pédagogies en développement, Pratiques Pédagogiques and Méthodes en Sciences Humaines.

== Honours ==
De Ketele received a special certificate of recognition from the Global Cultural Council in 2004 and was awarded an honorary doctorate by Cheikh Anta Diop University in 2011.
