= Geoffrey Ozin =

British chemist

Geoffrey Alan Ozin FRSC
- Born: London
- Education: King's College London B.Sc. (1965); Oriel College, Oxford D.Phil. (1967)
- Known for: Father of NanoChemistry
- Awards: Meldola Medal and Prize (1972); Rutherford Memorial Medal (1982); Albert Einstein World Award of Science (2011)
- Scientific career
- Workplaces: University of Toronto
- Thesis: The application of vibrational spectroscopy to some stereochemical problems (1967)
- Doctoral advisor: Ian R. Beattie

Geoffrey Alan Stuart Ozin FRSC is a British chemist, currently Tier 1 Canada Research Chair in Materials Chemistry and Distinguished University Professor at the University of Toronto Faculty of Arts and Science. Ozin is the recipient of numerous awards for his research on nanomaterials, including the Meldola Medal and Prize in 1972 and the Rutherford Memorial Medal in 1982. He won the Albert Einstein World Award of Science in 2011, the Royal Society of Chemistry's Centenary Prize in 2015, and the Humboldt Prize in 2005 and 2019. He has co-founded three university spin-off companies: Torrovap in 1985, which manufactures metal vapor synthesis scientific instrumentation; Opalux in 2006, which develops tunable photonic crystals; and Solistra in 2019, which develops photocatalysts and photoreactors for hydrogen production from carbon dioxide and methane.

== Early life and education ==
Initially planning on entering the family fashion and tailor business, he entered King's College London in 1962, the first member of his family to attend university. Ozin graduated with a first-class honours degree in chemistry from King's College London in 1965, and obtained his DPhil in inorganic chemistry at Oriel College, Oxford in 1967 with Prof. Ian R. Beattie. He then was an Imperial Chemical Industries postdoctoral fellow at the University of Southampton from 1967-1969. In 1969, he began his independent career at the University of Toronto as an assistant professor, teaching at both the St. George and Erindale (Mississauga) campuses. He was promoted to associate professor in 1972, and full professor in 1977.
