= Robert Yager =

British freelance photographer

Robert Yager is a British born, award-winning photographer based in Los Angeles. Having studied photography in the US, Yager began documenting Los Angeles street gangs in 1992. Since then, Yager has been a contributing photographer to a host of magazines.

== Biography ==
Robert Yager was born and grew up in London, England. He is a Los Angeles-based photographer. With an interest in anthropology. Particularly street culture and counter-culture and having studied Latin American Studies in the UK and Mexico, as well as photography in the US, Yager decided to delve into the world of Latino street gangs in Los Angeles. It was 1992 and he has been documenting the lives of gang members ever since.

Since the early 1990s Yager has been an editorial photographer, doing covers and features, portraits and reportage, for a host of magazines. Among them: The New York Times Magazine, The Observer (UK), The Independent, The Telegraph, The Guardian Weekend, The Sunday Times, Fortune, Fader, Esquire, Rolling Stone, Newsweek and TIME.

Among the accolades he has received, Yager was awarded a fellowship from the Aaron Siskind Foundation at the School of Visual Arts in New York and has twice been a finalist for the W. Eugene Smith Fund Award.

Yager published a historic monograph of his Playboys Gang photography with 550BC Publishers, titled "Playboys". The first edition in 2022, and the second in 2023. In 2007 he created a book with great Circle Books, titled 'a.k.a. BooBoo', which covers a 14-year time span in the life of Cindy Martinez, a female gang member. An exhibition of this work led to becoming David Lee Roth's personal photographer, documenting his return to touring the USA & Canada in Van Halen, during 2007, 2008, and again in 2012.

== Awards and achievements ==
- 2023 – Tokyo International Foto Awards: 2nd Place in Book/Gold in Documentary Book
- 2023 – Lucie Awards Book Prize: Finalist.
- 2023 – International Photography Awards: 2nd Place Book/Monograph
- 2023 – Px3 Prix de la Photographe Paris: Gold – Book/Monograph
- 2019 – Tokyo International Foto Awards Advertising winner
- 2019 – International Photography Awards Advertising/Fashion
- 2019 – PDN Photo Annual 2019 Advertising/Corporate Work winner
- 2012 – Finalist for the W. Eugene Smith Grant in Humanistic Photography
- 2008 – PDN Music Photography Award: 2nd place – David Lee Roth & Eddie Van Halen
- 2008 – International Photography Award: 3rd place- People/Lifestyle – David Lee Roth
- 2005 – International Photography Awards: 1st place – Editorial/Photo Essay – Playboys Gang Life
- 2004 – AOP Zeitgeist Award for editorial photography
- 1998 – 'Award of Excellence' Communication Arts
- 1996 – ‘Individual Photographer’s Fellowship’, Aaron Siskind Foundation, School of Visual Arts, NY.
- 1994/95 – 'Southern California Journalism Award', Los Angeles Press Club -'Best Photo Essay' in a weekly newspaper.
- 1994 – Finalist for the W. Eugene Smith Grant in Humanistic Photography

== Exhibitions ==
- 2024: “Gang Life in Los Angeles” House of Lucie, Athens, Greece. September-October 2024. Solo show
- 2024: “Projecting LA” Los Angeles April 27, 2024
- 2024: “Staring Into The Sun” – Webber Gallery, Los Angeles – December 2023-February 2024
- 2023: “Best of Show” - International Photography Awards – October 2023-December 2023
- 2023: “2 Live And Die In LA” February 2023
- 2020: "Foremost” Photography World’s Emerging Stars Exhibition – Hotel Collective, Okinawa, Japan, 16-30 January 2020.
- 2019-20: “Best of Show” International Photography Awards
- 2019: “On The Block – Images From The Street” – House of Lucie, Los Angeles October-November 2019.
- 2019: “We Rise” – Los Angeles. 18-27 May 2019.
- 2018-19: “Ink” – Museum of Latin American Art, Long Beach, California 25 August 2018 – 3 February 2019
- 2018: “We Rise” – Los Angeles. 18-28 May, 2018.
- 2018: “How To Read El Pato Pascual” – MAK Center, West Hollywood. September 2017- January 2018.
- 2014: “Postcards From The Edge” – Groundworks, Downtown Los Angeles. November 2013-January 2014.
- 2012: "Mariposa Nocturnal" – Smoking Mirrors, Pomona, California. August–September
- 2011: "Land of the Lost Angels" – Canal Club, Venice, California. April
- 2011: "Valley of the Dolls" – L.A. Design Center, Los Angeles, California. February
- 2010: "Tonanzin" – Smoking Mirrors, Pomona, California. December
- 2010: "Callajeros" – Smoking Mirrors, Pomona, California. February
- 2009: "Document" – Paul Bright Gallery, Toronto, Canada. May
- 2007: "a.k.a BooBoo" – A&I Photo Lab, Los Angeles, California. June–August Solo Show
- 2006: "Gang Life" – Jennie Ricketts Gallery, Brighton, England. September Solo Show
- 2006: "Vice Show" – Silverstein Gallery, New York City, New York. July
- 2005: Create:Fixate "Deluxe" – HD Buttercup, Los Angeles, California. May
- 2005: "Park Your Art" (curated by Ethan Cohen) – Art LA, Santa Monica, California, January
- 2004: Create:Fixate "The Photography Show" – Spring Arts Tower, Los Angeles, California, July
- 1999: "Remembrance: The Eternal Present" - Houston Center for Photography, Houston, Texas. March–May
- 1997: Visa Pour L’Image festival of photojournalism – Perpignan, France. September
- 1997: "The Cross in a Contemporary World" – Sag Harbor Picture Gallery, Sag Harbor, New York. March–May
- 1996–1997: "Wedding Days: Images of Matrimony in Photography" – Japan. May–March
- 1995: "P.L.A.N. (Photography in Los Angeles Now)" – Unity Arts Center and Spring Street Galleries, Los Angeles, California. July–September
- 1995: "Pulp Fact" – The Photographers’ Gallery, London, England. May–June
- 1995: "Artists For Chiapas" – Julie Rico Gallery, Santa Monica, California. May
- 1994: "Current Works" – Leedy Voulkos Art Center Gallery, Kansas City, Kansas. September–October
- 1993: "Wings of Change" - The Directors’ Guild of America, Los Angeles, California. November–December
