= Werner Stumm =

Swiss geochemist (1924–1999)

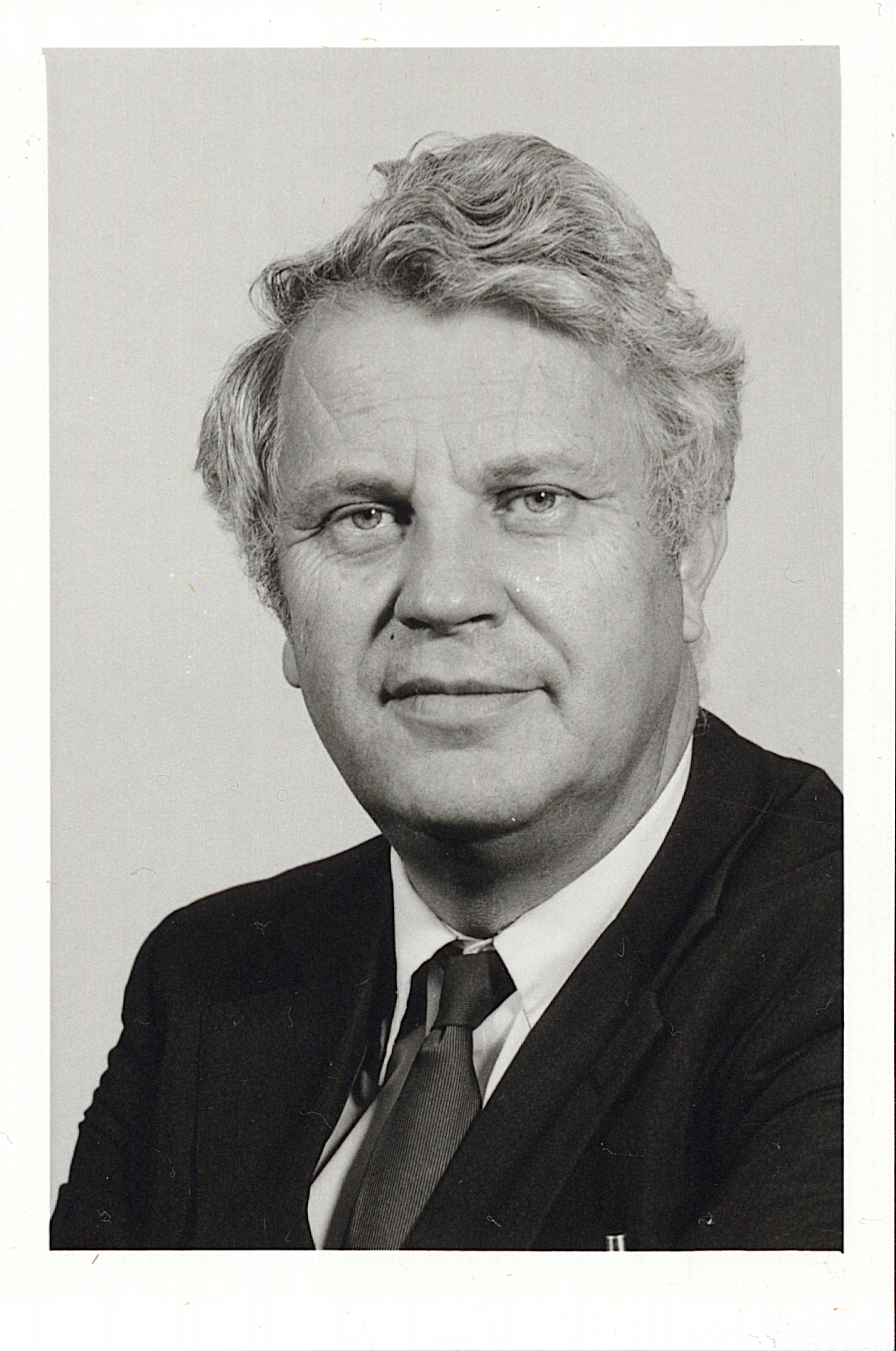
- Born: 1924
- Died: 14 April 1999 (aged 74–75)
- Education: ETH Zurich (Switzerland)
- Scientific career
- Workplaces: Harvard University, EAWAG, Dübendorf (1970-1992)

Werner Stumm (1924 – 14 April 1999) was a Swiss chemist. After earning his doctorate in inorganic chemistry at the University of Zürich in 1952 (with a dissertation titled Versuche zur analytischen Anwendung von Austauschcharzen), he moved to the U.S., where he was active as a professor at Harvard University until 1969. From 1970 until 1992, he was head of the Swiss Federal Water Resources Centre EAWAG.

Werner Stumm was an active researcher in several aspects of geochemistry. During the early part of his career, he was influenced by the ideas of Lars Gunnar Sillén and Robert Garrels regarding aqueous chemical equilibria. He developed models where the ideas by Sillén regarding equilibria were combined with improved descriptions of kinetically controlled reactions (i.e. slow reactions that do not reach equilibrium, e.g. weathering). He, in particular, made contributions to the knowledge of the reactions at the interface of minerals and water. In his more than 200 scientific articles, he showed, among other things, that the rate by which a mineral weathers depends on the surface charge, which in turn is controlled by factors such as pH and the chemical composition of aqueous solutions.

Stumm is also known for writing the influential book Aquatic Chemistry, together with James J. Morgan, and several other books on the interplay between mineral surfaces and water.

The European Association of Geochemistry quinquennially awards a Science Innovation Award medal named in his honour for work in low-temperature and surface geochemistry.

== Prizes and awards ==
- Albert Einstein World Award of Science from the World Cultural Council (1985)
- Tyler Prize for Environmental Achievement (1986)
- Teknologie hedersdoktor (doctor honoris causa) Royal Institute of Technology (Sweden) (1987).
- Marcel Benoist Prize (1990)
- V. M. Goldschmidt Award (1998)
- Stockholm Water Prize (1999)

== Honorary function ==
Preceded by Charles Tanford	Honorary President of the World Cultural Council; 1988 – 1991	Succeeded by José Estrada

== Bibliography (selection of monographs) ==
- Aquatic chemistry, together with James J. Morgan (1970, Wiley; 3rd revised edition 1996)
- Aquatic surface chemistry: chemical processes at the particle-water interface (1987, Wiley)
- Aquatic chemical kinetics: reaction rates of processes in natural waters (1990, Wiley)
