= Swiss Federal Institute of Aquatic Science and Technology =

Swiss federal research institute

Coordinates: 47.403781°N 8.609558°E

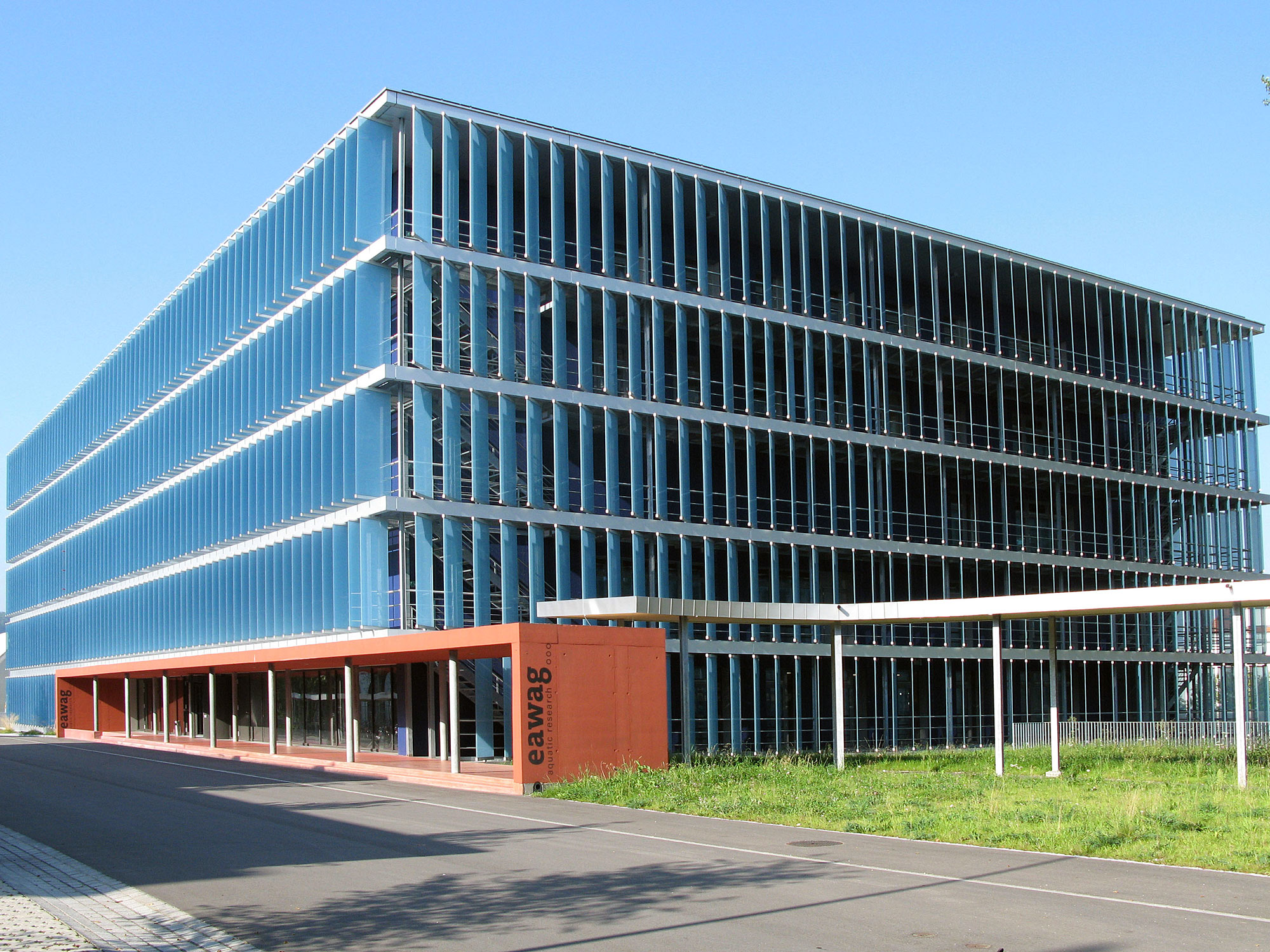
- Eawag's Headquarter at Forum Chriesbach, in Dübendorf
- Former name: EAWAG
- Type: Public
- Established: 1936
- Budget: 86.568 million CHF (2024)
- Director: Martin Ackermann
- Academic staff: ~ 349 (2024)
- Administrative staff: ~ 183 (2024)
- Location: Dübendorf, ZH, Switzerland
- Campus: Dübendorf and Kastanienbaum
- Website: www.eawag.ch

The Swiss Federal Institute of Aquatic Science and Technology (Eawag; German: Eidgenössische Anstalt für Wasserversorgung, Abwasserreinigung und Gewässerschutz) is a Swiss water research institute and an internationally networked institution. As part of the Swiss Federal Institutes of Technology Domain, it is an institution of the Federal Department of Home Affairs of the Swiss Confederation. The Eawag is based in Dübendorf near Zurich and Kastanienbaum near Lucerne.

After its foundation in 1936 it concentrated on wastewater treatment and drinking water supplies. From these beginnings it has expanded into a multidisciplinary research institute with a focus on three primary research areas: water as a foundation of health and well-being, water as an essential factor in the functioning of our ecological systems, and strategies for the mitigation of water use conflicts. Nowadays, with a staff of over 500 employees, Eawag is actively engaged in research, teaching and consulting in all areas pertaining to water. Eawag's overall aim is to ensure the sustainable use of water resources and infrastructure and to harmonize the ecological, economic and social interests associated with bodies of water. In doing so, the Eawag plays an important role in bridging research and practice.

== History ==
The Eawag was founded in 1936 as an advisory board of the ETH Zurich for wastewater treatment and drinking water supplies. Less than ten years later this information center officially becomes the Swiss Federal Institute of Aquatic Science and Technology (or EAWAG as per its German acronym) whose mission is increasingly devoted to developing integrated approaches to water management and protection: besides being key to implementing the first water management regulation in 1957, the institute later demonstrated that the growth of green algae that plagued Swiss lakes at the time was mostly due to the release of detergent-derived phosphates. These were finally banned in 1985.

The institute grew through the 1960s and 1970s: first came the Kastanienbaum hydrobiological research centre, followed in 1968 by WHO's recently created International Reference Centre for Waste Disposal, out of which the current Department for Sanitation, Water and Solid Waste for Development (Sandec) emerged.

In 1970 Eawag, until then an institute within ETH Zurich becomes an affiliated institute within the ETH system, moving a few months later in their new premises in Dübendorf. In 1993, a new law sets it as an independent water research institute within the ETH domain. In 2004 the Fishing Information Centre FIBER, in 2008 the Water Agenda 21 and the Ecotox Centre, and in 2010 the centres of excellence CEEB and CCDW were founded. In 2007 Eawag moved to the Forum Chriesbach, itself a winner of several environmental awards.

== Activities ==
=== Research ===
As a water research institute Eawag has three major focus areas:

- Water for human welfare

Safe drinking water supply and wastewater disposal are essential to maintain human welfare. Eawag research projects aim to develop optimum approaches and strategies to meet future threats caused by increasing contamination, population growth, and climate change.

- Water for ecosystem function

The increasing pressure of civilisation has a negative influence on the water environment and ecosystems. Developing strategies and measures to both strengthen the resilience and adaptive capacity of ecosystems. Maintaining a sustainable provision of ecosystem services is another focus of Eawag research.

- Strategies for trade-offs and competing demands

Water use conflicts arise when direct human needs for water and the prevention of negative impacts on ecosystems have to be accommodated at the same time. Eawag research projects develop integrated approaches and put specific emphasis on strategies to meet energy concerns in the context of trade-offs and competing demands.

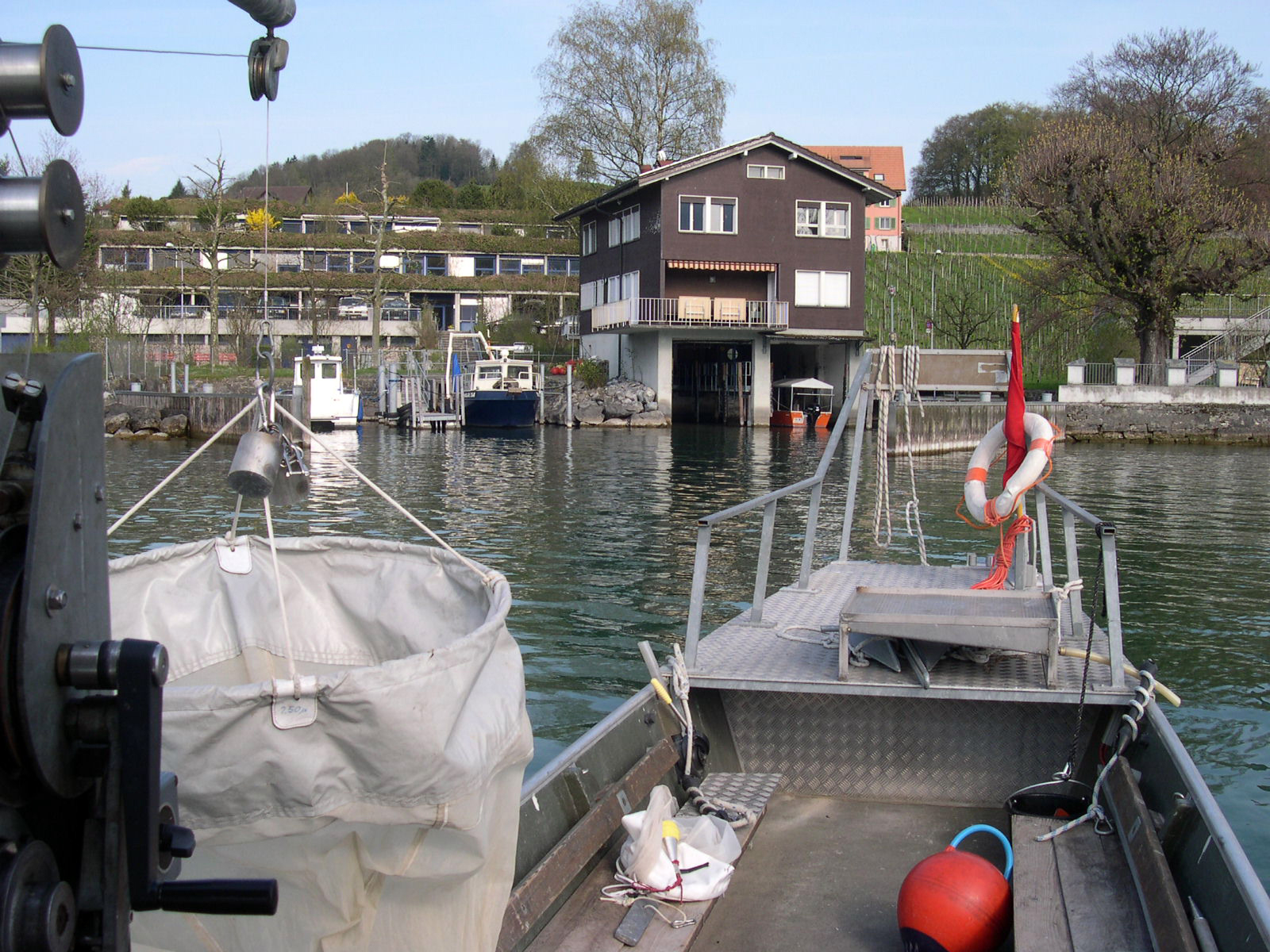
The Center for Ecology, Evolution and Biogeochemistry (CEEB) as well as the Swiss Fisheries Advisory Office both operate in Kastanienbaum.

The Eawag has twelve research departments, where research is conducted by natural and social scientists and engineers. This combination permits a wide range of water research. These departments are:

- Aquatic Ecology (ECO) - investigates life in water and encompasses various disciplines within ecology and evolutionary biology.
- Environmental Chemistry (UCHEM) - researches the effect of contaminants in waters and their reduction to improve water quality.
- Environmental Microbiology (UMIK) - deals with microbial life and activities in surface and ground water, in drinking water and in technical systems such as wastewater treatment and drinking water treatment plants.
- Environmental Social Sciences (ESS) - investigates environment-related societal processes from the background of several social science disciplines.
- Environmental Toxicology (UTOX) - aims to recognize and understand the effects of chemicals on the aquatic environment.
- Fish Ecology and Evolution (FISHEC) - investigates the life, evolution and biodiversity of aquatic organisms, most especially fish.
- Process Engineering (ENG) - deals with current and future problems of wastewater and drinking water treatment, as well as the protection of water resources and resource recycling.
- Sanitation, Water and Solid Waste for Development (SANDEC) - by enhancing local competencies, Sandec contributes to improvements in water supply and wastewater management in developing countries.
- Surface Waters Research and Management (SURF) - researches and manages aquatic system processes.
- System Analysis, Integrated Assessment and Modelling (SIAM) - develops models and techniques in order to understand and predict processes which affect water and other natural resources.
- Urban Water Management (SWW) - strives to develop sustainable concepts for water and nutrient cycles in urban areas.
- Water Resource and Drinking Water - (W+T) - researches physical and chemical processes in bodies of water with the aim of ensuring the long-term quantity and quality of drinking water.

Together with external partners and various Eawag departments, the Eawag directs and participates in interdisciplinary and trans-disciplinary projects in order to combine pure research with practical problem-solving.

=== Teaching ===
Eawag Directors (1936 – today)
	Tenure
Willy von Gonzenbach & Eugene Meyer-Peter	1936–1946
Ulrich Corti	1946–1952
Otto Jaag	1952–1970
Werner Stumm	1970–1992
Alexander J.B. Zehnder	1992–2004
Ulrich Bundi (ad interim)	2004–2007
Janet Hering	2007–2022
Martin Ackermann	2023-present

The Eawag supports universities in educating undergraduate and doctoral candidates in the natural, engineering and social sciences. Numerous master's students and doctoral candidates from within the country and from abroad are supervised and guided in projects pertaining to water research every year. In addition, approximately 26 apprentices are trained in laboratory, commercial or IT-related areas. Furthermore, the Eawag offers specialists in water resources management, administration and science regular courses in further education (PEAK – practice oriented Eawag courses). The courses are based on current research work and experience and help to promote communication exchanges of knowledge and experience between research and practice. In the area of further education, six research scholarships are granted to undergraduate and doctoral candidates from developing countries each year within the framework of the Partnership Program for Developing Countries (EPP).

=== Consulting ===
The Eawag carries out various advisory mandates both inland and abroad including, for example, for the Swiss Confederation, Cantons and NGOs. Eawag specialists sit as experts in numerous national and international boards and committees. The Eawag aquatic research institute is, moreover, home to various specialist advisory centres:

- The Swiss Centre for Applied Ecotoxicology Eawag – EPFL, serves as a knowledge hub and discussion platform for research and development, consulting and education in the field of applied toxicology.
- The Fisheries Advisory Office (FIBER), a centre for information and further education for recreational and professional fishermen, is jointly run by Eawag, the Federal Office for the Environment and the Swiss Fishing Association.
- Water-Agenda 21, an information platform and forum to support the development of strategies for water resource management.
- SODIS (Solar Water Disinfection), a project aimed at securing access to clean drinking water in developing countries. The method is a simple process for disinfecting drinking water which uses sunlight to kill off pathogenic agents such as viruses, parasites and bacteria.
- The Micropollutants Process Engineering Platform is a project run jointly by the Swiss Water Association, Swiss Federal Office of the Environment and Eawag. The platform was set up in 2012 and has established itself as a central, independent advisory unit for technical issues on the elimination of trace elements in wastewater treatment plants.
- The Platform for Water Quality was co-founded 2015 by the Swiss Water Association, Eawag and the Federal Office for the Environment: it is aimed at water quality assessment in surface waters, with a particular emphasis on micropollutants.

== Awards ==
Eawag researchers have received national and international awards for their achievements. The most important awards include:

- 2016: Peter Kilham Memorial Award, Ole Seehausen
- 2016: Energy Globe National Award Morocco, Bouziane Outiti
- 2015: Swiss Academies Award for Transdisciplinary Research, Sabine Hoffmann
- 2015: Distinguished Women in Chemistry Award, Janet Hering
- 2015: Harvey M. Rosen Memorial Award, Elisabeth Salhi, Urs von Gunten et al.
- 2015: Theodosius-Dobzhansky Prize, Catherine Wagner
- 2014: IWA Project Innovation Award (Global), Tove Larsen et al.
- 2014: IWA Project Innovation Award (Europe & West Asia), Tove Larsen
- 2012: Special Recognition Award for outstanding design at the 'Re-invent the Toilet' competition sponsored by the Bill and Melinda Gates Foundation, Tove Larsen et al.
- 2012: J.E. Brandenberger Prize, Martin Wegelin
- 2011: IWA Development Solutions Award, Sandec
- 2010: Muelheim Water Award, Thomas Egli
- 2009: Vietnamese Medal of Honour for outstanding achievements in teaching and professional training in Vietnam for Michael Berg, Walter Giger, Antoine Morel and Roland Schertenleib
- 2008: Credit Suisse Award for Best Teaching, Willi Gujer
- 2008: Transdisciplinarity Award for the Novaquatis project for Tove Larsen and Judit Lienert
- 2007: Watt d’Or for the energy efficiency of the Eawag building 'Forum Chriesbach'
- 2006: Muehlheim Water Award, Marc Böhler
- 2004: Energy Globe Award for SODIS
- 1999: Stockholm Water Prize, Werner Stumm
- 1990: Marcel Benoist Prize, Bruno Messerli, Werner Stumm and Hans Oeschger

The Otto Jaag Water Protection Prize was set up in 1980 in order to honor dissertations and master's theses at the ETH Zurich in the area of water protection and hydrology. Numerous young Eawag researchers have been recipients of this award since then.

== See also ==
- Science and technology in Switzerland
