= List of things named after Leonardo da Vinci =

This is a list of things named after Leonardo da Vinci.

== Places ==
- Leonardo da Vinci–Fiumicino Airport, Rome, Italy
- Museo della Scienza e della Tecnologia "Leonardo da Vinci", Milan, Italy
- Da Vinci, a crater on the Moon
- Da Vinci-Broen (Da Vinci Bridge), a small-scale replica of the bridge Leonardo designed to span the Golden Horn, in Ås, Viken, Norway
- Da Vinci, a Michelin-starred restaurant in Maasbracht, Netherlands
- Da Vinci Tower, a proposed 420-metre (1,378 ft), 80-floor tower in Dubai, United Arab Emirates

=== Schools and colleges ===
- Colégio Anglo Leonardo da Vinci, São Paulo, Brazil
- DaVinci Academy of Science and the Arts, a charter high school in Ogden, Utah
- Leonardo da Vinci Art Institute, Cairo, Egypt
- Leonardo da Vinci Art School, formerly in New York City
- Leonardo da Vinci Gymnasium, Neckargemünd, Germany
- Leonardo da Vinci High School, Davis, California
- Leonardo da Vinci High School, Buffalo, New York
- da Vinci Arts Middle School, Portland, Oregon

== Ships ==
- Leonardo da Vinci, a Conte di Cavour class battleship of the Italian navy. (1910–1923)
- Italian submarine Leonardo da Vinci (1939), a Marconi-class submarine launched in 1939 and sunk in 1943.
- Italian submarine Leonardo da Vinci (S 510), a Gato-class submarine launched in 1942 as USS Dace for the United States Navy and transferred in 1955. She was returned in 1972.
- Italian submarine Leonardo da Vinci (S 520), a Sauro-class submarine launched in 1979 and decommissioned in 2010.
- GTS Da Vinci, briefly (in 2008) the name of a cruise ship owned by Club Cruise (1977–2008)

== Technology ==
- DAVINCI+, a planned NASA mission to send an atmospheric probe to Venus
- Da Vinci Machine, a Sun Microsystems project aiming to prototype the extension of the Java Virtual Machine to add support for dynamic languages
- da Vinci Project, a former project to launch a suborbital crewed spacecraft
- Da Vinci Surgical System, a robotic surgery system
- da Vinci Systems, Color Correctors
- Leonardo MPLM, a multi-purpose logistics module used to re-supply the International Space Station
- Texas Instruments DaVinci, a system-on-a-chip for digital video
- DaVinci Resolve, a video editor produced by Blackmagic Design

== Music ==
- Da Vinci, a Portuguese pop rock band
- Da Vinci's Notebook, an American a cappella group.

== Fictional characters ==
- Leonardo, a lead character in Teenage Mutant Ninja Turtles
- Léonard, lead character of the eponymous comic series by Philippe Liégeois and Bob De Groot
- Leonardo Acropolis, a painter in the BBC sitcom Blackadder II
- Giulietta da Vinci, fictional character from the 1999 James Bond film The World Is Not Enough
- Leonard of Quirm, the analogue of Da Vinci in Terry Pratchett's Discworld series of novels.
- Larry Da Vinci, a character in the LittleBigPlanet series of games.
- Da Vinci, a character in 101 Dalmatian Street.

== Awards ==
- Leonardo da Vinci International Award, awarded by an international consortium of Rotary Clubs
- ASME Leonardo Da Vinci Award, awarded by the American Society of Mechanical Engineers
- Leonardo da Vinci World Award of Arts, awarded by the World Cultural Council (Mexico)
- Leonardo da Vinci Medal, awarded by the Society for the History of Technology

== Business ==
- Leonardo S.p.A., an Italian multinational aerospace, defence and security company

== Other ==
- Leonardo davincii, a species of moth from Sudan
- Leonardo da Vinci programme (European Commission funding programme)
- Leonardo polyhedron
- Leonardo, the International Society for the Arts, Sciences and Technology and their journals Leonardo and Leonardo Music Journal
- Da Vinci's Challenge, a board game
- The House of Da Vinci, a video game
