= Rita Asfour =

American Impressionist (1933–2021)

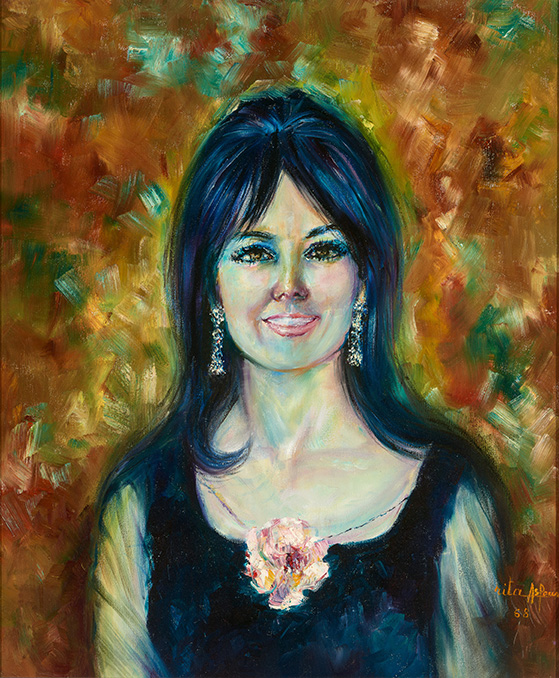
- Self-portrait
- Born: Markrit Thomassian; February 9, 1933; Cairo, Egypt
- Died: June 29, 2021 (aged 88); Las Vegas, Nevada, US
- Style: Impressionist
- Spouse: Jeffrey Asfour
- Children: Amber Asfour
- Website: ritaasfour.com

Rita Asfour (February 9, 1933 – June 29, 2021), born Markrit Thomassian, was an American visual artist known for her figurative paintings of women. Her work explored the sensuality of women and their place in society. Two of her larger series were studies of ballerinas backstage and of Las Vegas show girls. She used vibrant colours on large canvases in an impressionist style.

== Early and personal life ==
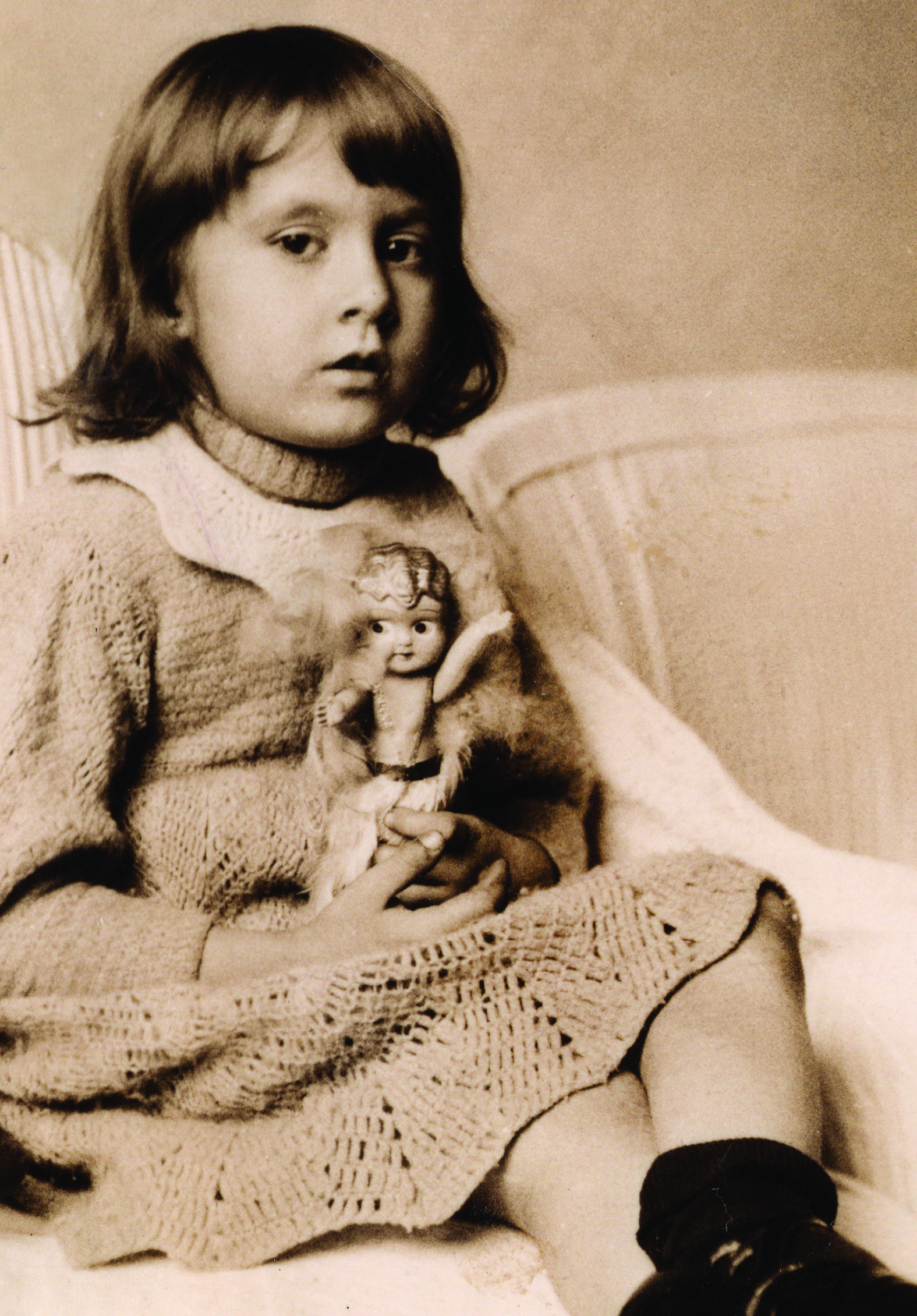
Asfour at eight years

Asfour was born in Cairo, Egypt in 1933. Her father was Kaspar Thomassian, a man of Armenian heritage who was born in Turkey. Her mother was Gamila Khoury, born in Aleppo, Syria in 1905. The couple were refugees of World War I who settled in Egypt, where Asfour was born as the second of three children.

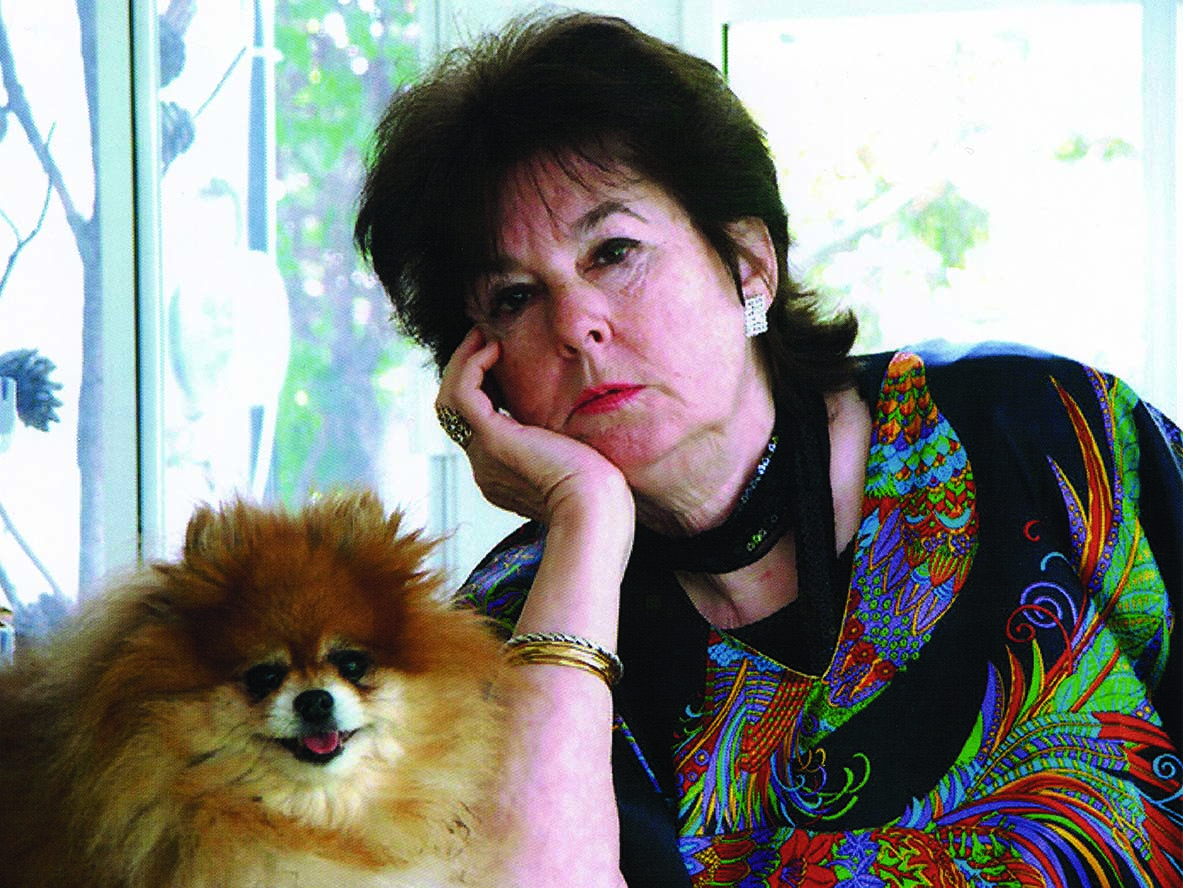
Rita with Bambi at her Malibu studio.

Asfour married K. Jeffrey Asfour, an aerospace engineer at the Tropicana Hotel Las Vegas in November 1965. Her daughter, Amber, was born in 1973. Amber was a frequent subject of Asfour's paintings.

Asfour died in 2021 at age 88 years from complications of a broken leg sustained in an accident.

== Education ==
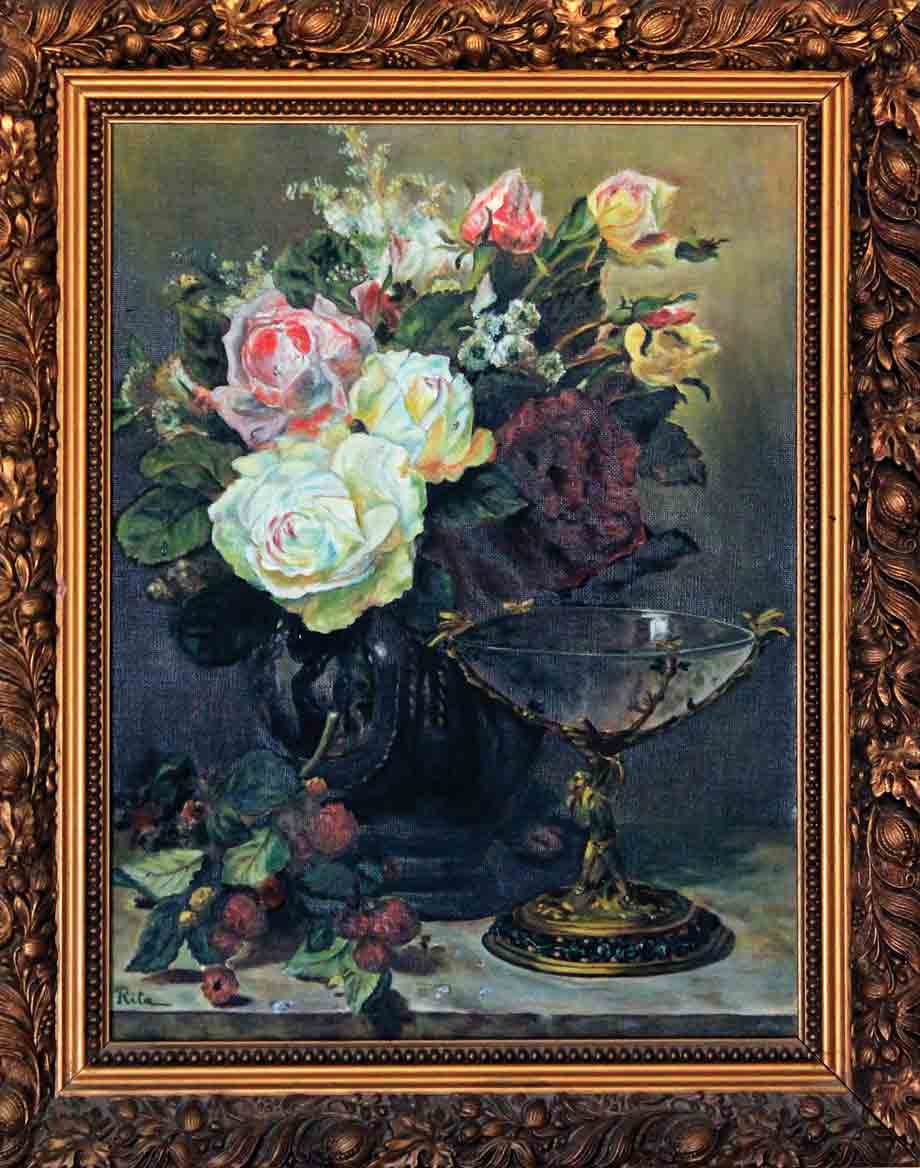
Still life, April 24, 1958, Cairo.

Asfour attended a French Catholic elementary school and then the Lycée Français du Caire. From 1953 to 1959, she attended the Leonardo da Vinci Art Institute where she received a Bachelor of Fine Arts.

In the United States in 1968, Asfour took private lessons with French landscape artist, Samuel Markitante (1887–1975). The following year, Asfour attended classes at the Otis College of Art and Design in Los Angeles.

== Career ==
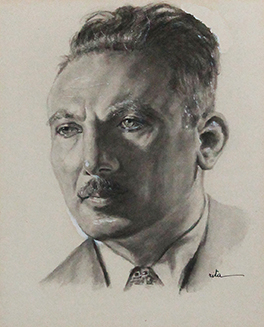
China ink on paper, Beirut, January 10, 1963.

Asfour's first full time employment was in Beirut as an colourist and illustrator and then as an art director of a weekly entertainment magazine. She also contributed to a children's magazine and illustrated the covers of paperback thrillers.

In 1965, searching for better opportunities, Asfour emigrated to Los Angeles, United States and worked sketching pastel portraits for tourists at Universal Studios Lot. She was a resident of Malibu.

In 1968, W. & J. Sloane, an upmarket interior decor store in Beverly Hills, accepted twelve of Asfour paintings on consignment.

Art Expo 1981 in San Francisco was the first of many art expositions in which Asfour exhibited and sold her paintings.

Asfour opened her own gallery, the Galerie Camille, on Canon drive in Beverly Hills. At this time, Tricia Nixon and Otis Chandler commissioned portraits from Asfour.

In 1991, Asfour had an exhibition at Lumina Art Gallery in Trenton, New Jersey. That gallery was owned by John Salvo, who later became manager of the Martin Lawrence Galleries in SoHo, Manhattan.

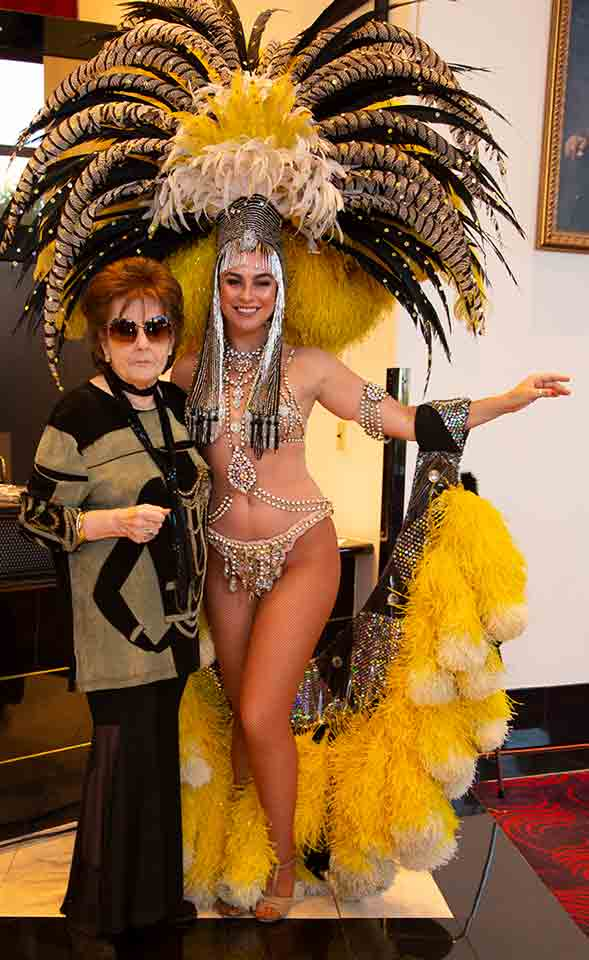
Asfour and showgirl, August 16, 2016.

In 2012, having previously retired to Las Vegas, Asfour returned to painting after being inspired by a showgirl spectacular called "Jubilee" at Bally's Hotel. These paintings were exhibited by Robert Tracy, curator, Department of Fine Arts, at the University of Nevada, Reno in 2016. The exhibition was called "Rita Asfour - Her Way!" The opening ceremony featured a parade of showgirls. The showgirls were the subject of her art till her death in 2021.

== Media, genre and style ==
Although Asfour offered sketches, landscapes, seriographs, lithographs and sculptures in paper, plaster and one in bronze; oil on canvas and acrylic paintings were her principal media.

Asfour was known for her figurative paintings of women, exploring their sensuality. She was well travelled, including time spent at the Paul Gauguin Museum in Tahiti, French Polynesia.

Early in her career, Asfour was influenced by the impressionist artists. Through her career, Asfour's canvasses became larger, her style freer, colours brighter and subjects more varied. Her subjects included Malibu landmarks, ballet students at Pepperdine University and the Las Vegas showgirls.

== Print and broadcast media ==
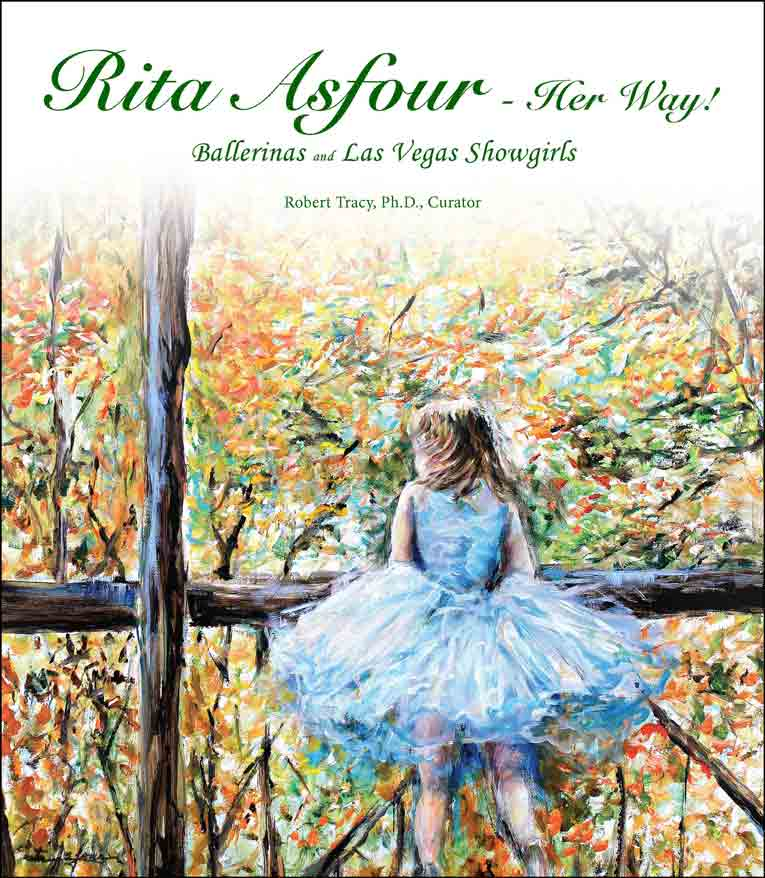
University of Nevada Exhibition Guidebook, 2016.

Asfour's art first appeared in print media in the 1968 W.&J. Sloane exhibition brochure. This was followed by cover art for a Lincoln's Day celebration, publication in "Art Happenings" in the Los Angeles magazine and with Marjorie Walker in The Beverly Hills Courier in 1971.

In 1991 and 1993, Asfour's art appeared with the articles "The New Impressionists" and "Pure Visual Sensation" by Andrew C. Voth and Kathleen Heiser respectively in the Sunstorm Fine Art Magazine. In 1992, her art accompanied "Facing Market Challenges" by Deborah K. Swanson in Art Expo Preview. The Leukaemia Society of America used Asfour's art in their publication, "The Art of Giving" in 1992 and 1993.

Robert Tracey championed Asfour's art in 2016 and 2022 with "Rita Asfour, Her Way - An Exhibition Guidebook"; "Ballerinas and Showgirls" and "Everlasting Impressions".

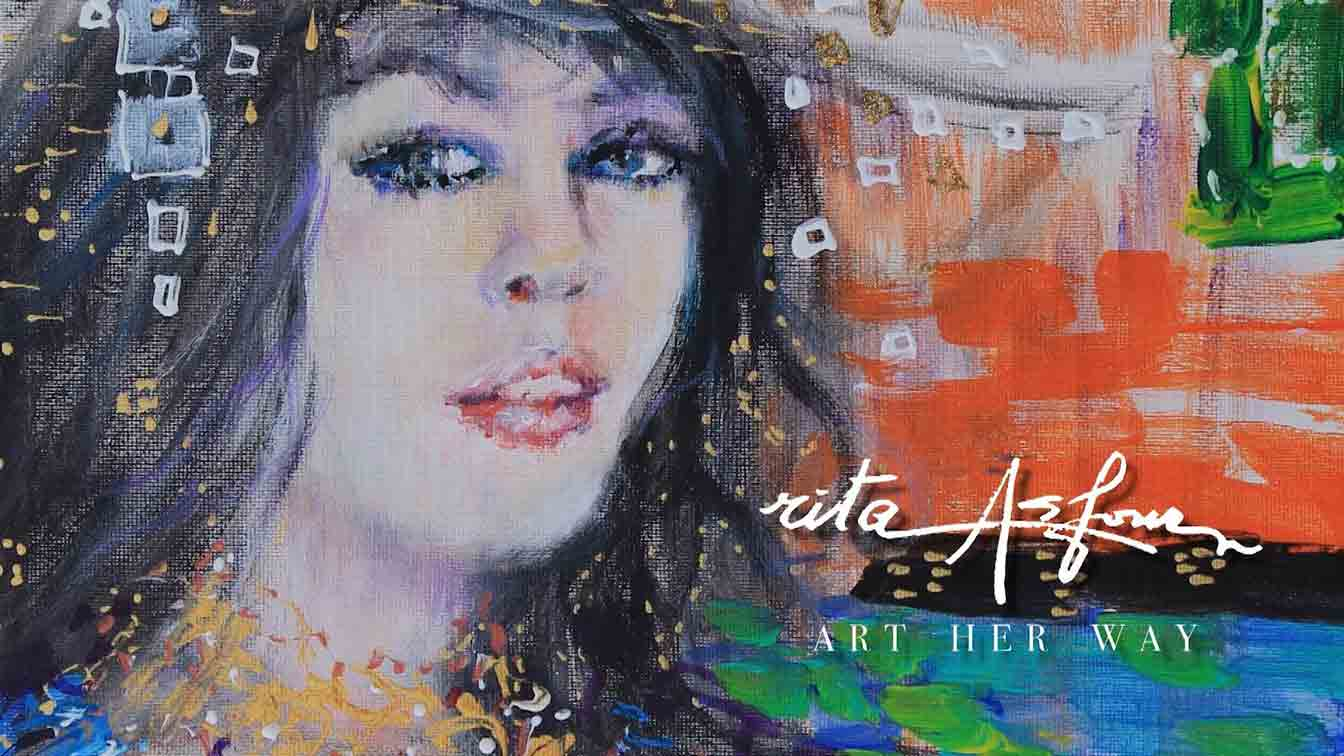
Image for "Rita Asfour: Art Her Way" on PBS.

In 2017, PBS broadcast an half-hour documentary about Asfour's long artistic career. Then, in 2021, Asfour was featured in a one-hour Vegas PBS documentary about showgirls, titled, "The Showgirl: A Las Vegas Icon."

== Philanthropy ==
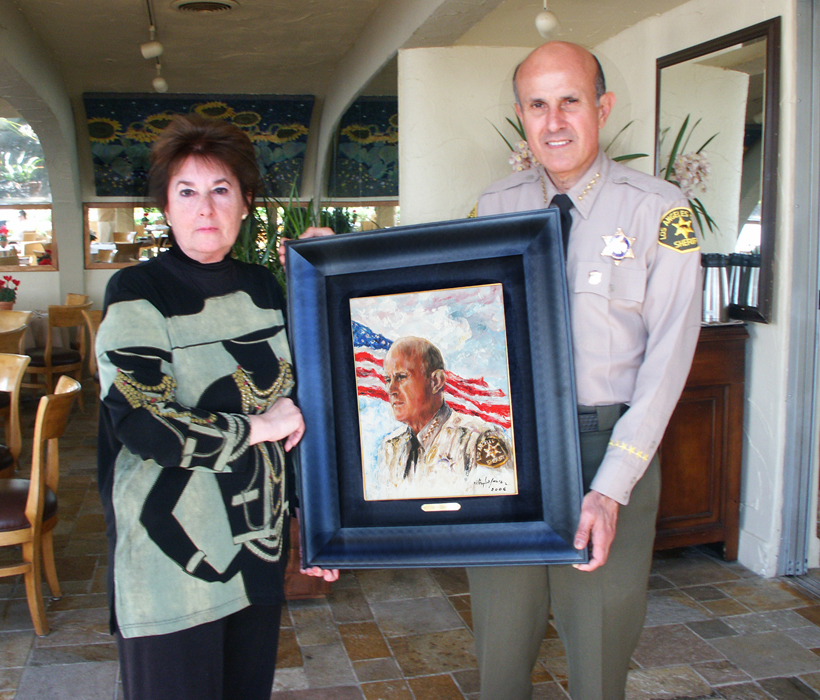
Sherrif Lee Baca receives his portrait, February 7, 2006.

In 1965, Asfour donated thirty paintings to the City of Hope in Los Angeles.

In 2003, Asfour donated paintings and prints to the Leukemia Society in Pittsburgh.

The Los Angeles County Sherriff's Office received the proceeds from the sale of 2006 calendars featuring twelve printed paintings of Malibu landmarks.

In 2020, Asfour donated money and prints of her paintings to the PBS satation in Las Vegas.

== Tributes ==
"Rita Asfour’s legacy will be that of an enabled artist who never gave up on doing it – Her Way!" Professor Robert Tracey, Curator, College of Fine Arts, University of Nevada.

“Rita Asfour’s work embodies the spirit of Vegas glamour, in the same way Toulouse Lautrec captured the allure of the Moulin Rouge in 19th century Paris.” Professor Sean Clark, Associate Dean, College of Fine Arts, University of Nevada.

“When you have a visionary brilliant artist like Rita Asfour, she will find the right medium to express her ideas.” Dr Nancy J. Uscher, Dean, College of Fine Arts, University of Nevada.

== 1960s ==
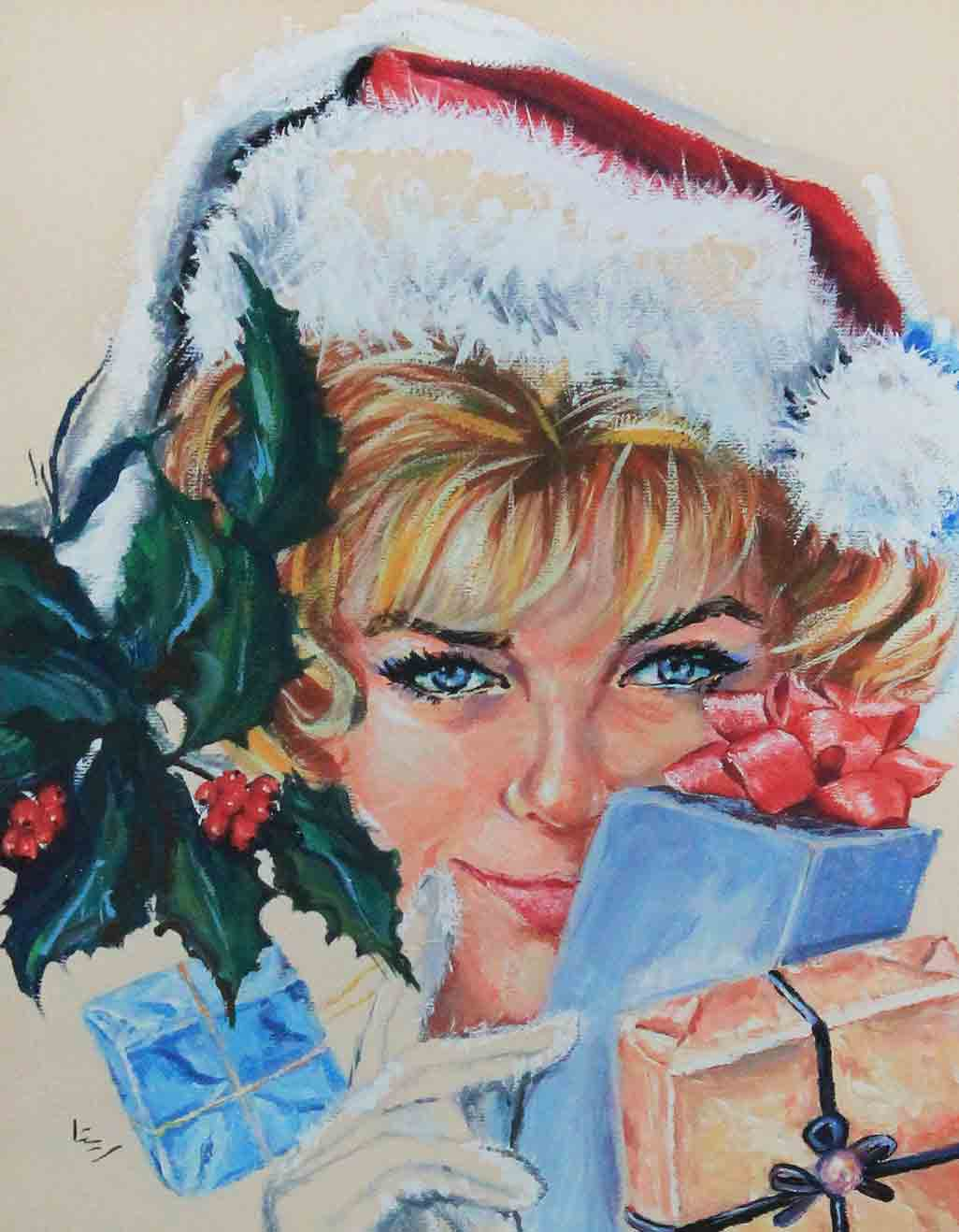
Christmas Illustration, May 17, 1962.

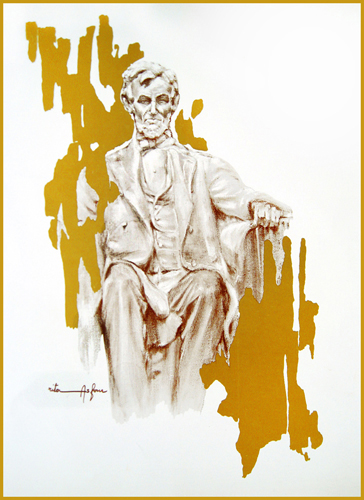
Sketch of Abraham Lincoln, November 13, 1968.

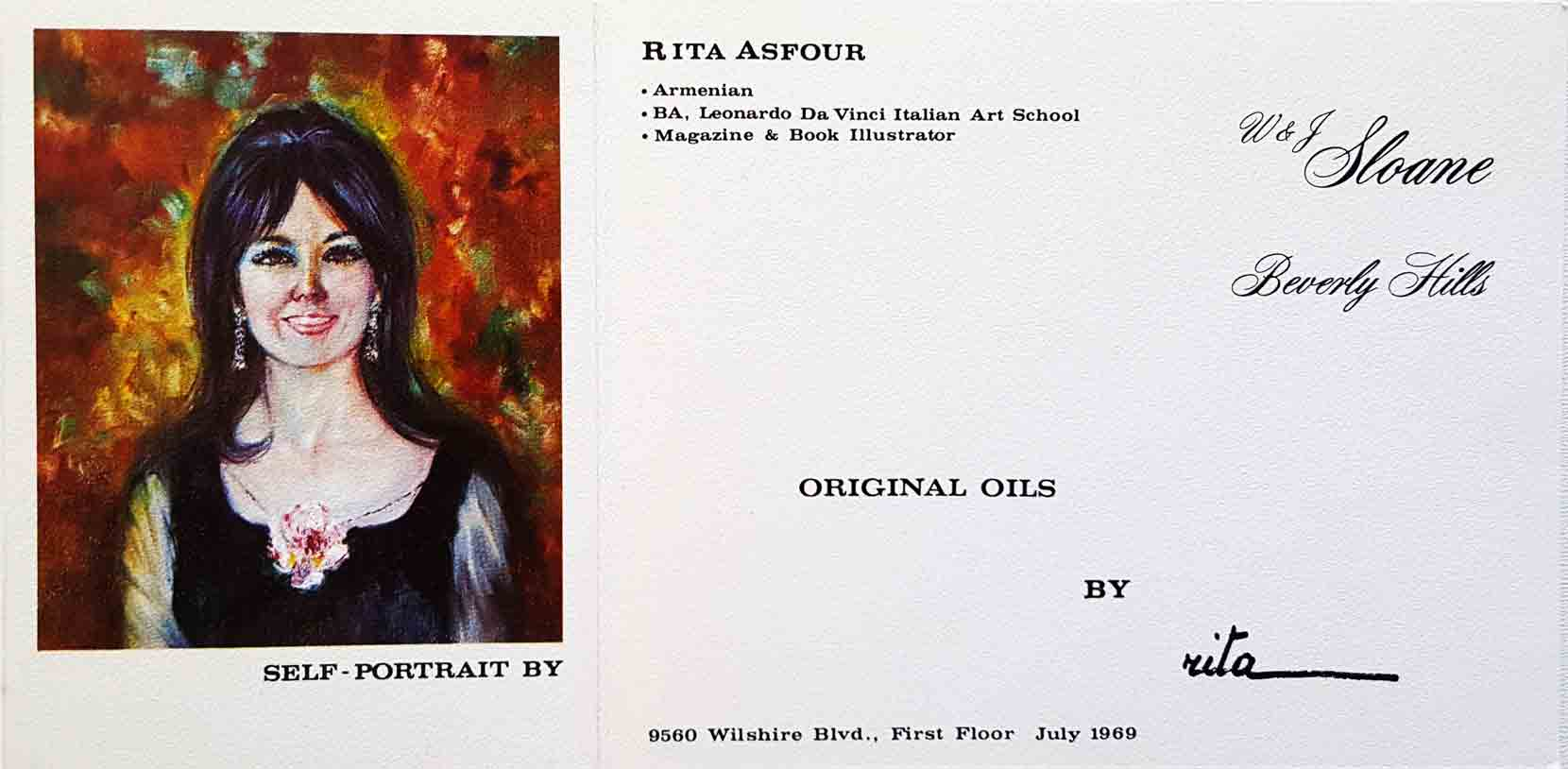
Invitation to an art exhibition, 1969.

== 1970s - Tahiti ==
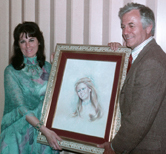
Alphonso Bell accepting a drawing of Tricia Nixon on behalf of Richard Nixon March 9, 1973.

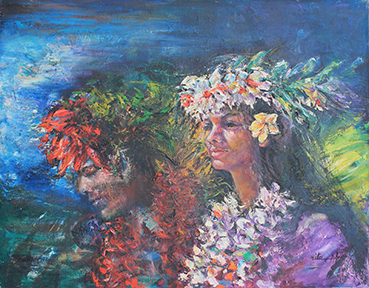
Two Tahitian Dancers, September 17, 1970.

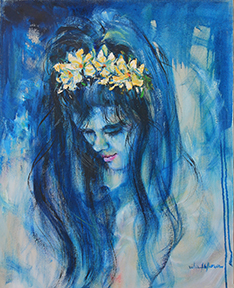
Young Tahitian Girl, November 6, 1970.

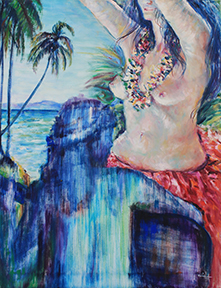
Nude Tahitian Dancer, February 18, 1970.

== 1980s and 1990s ==
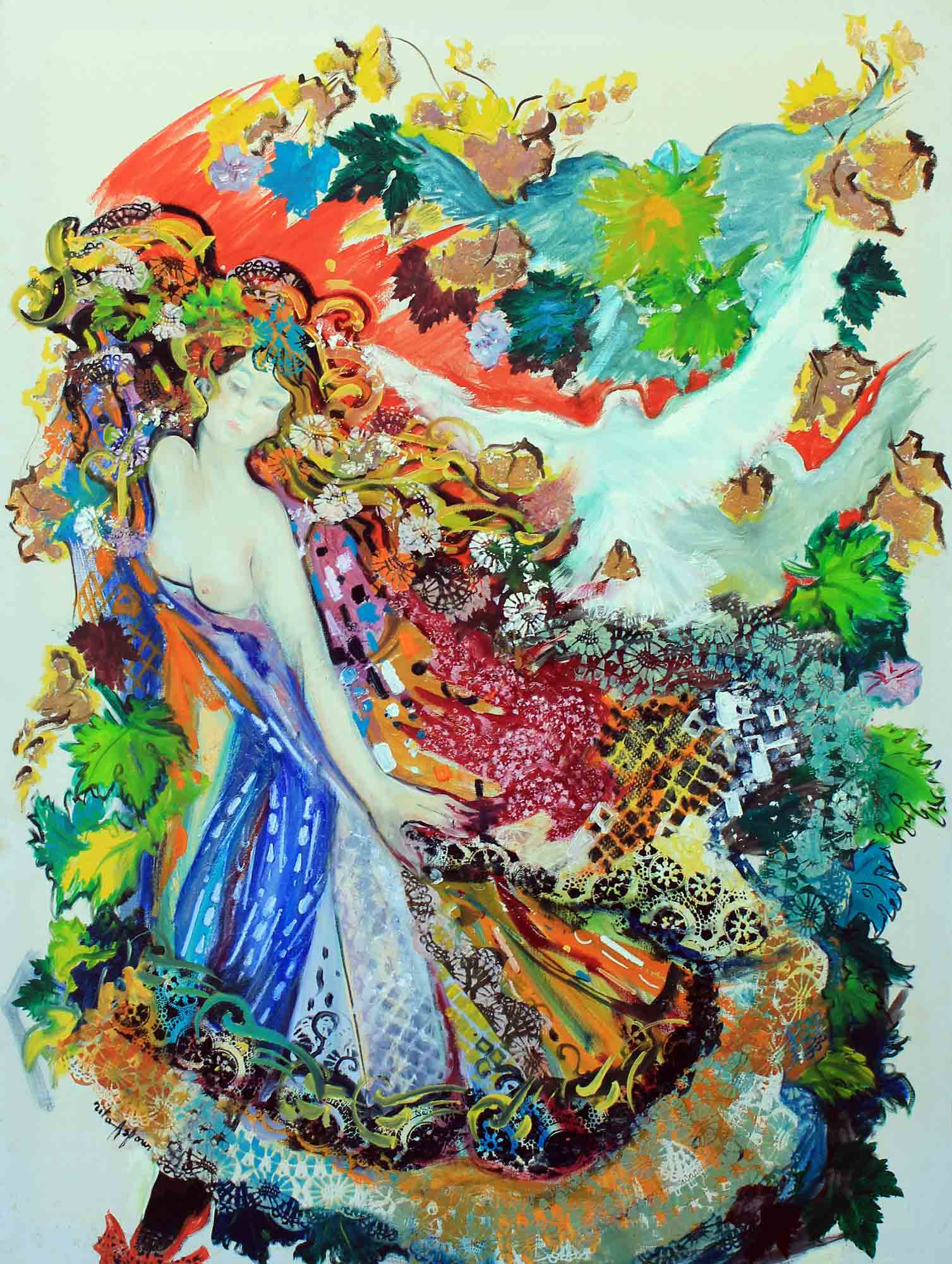
Maiden Dream, September 18, 1986.

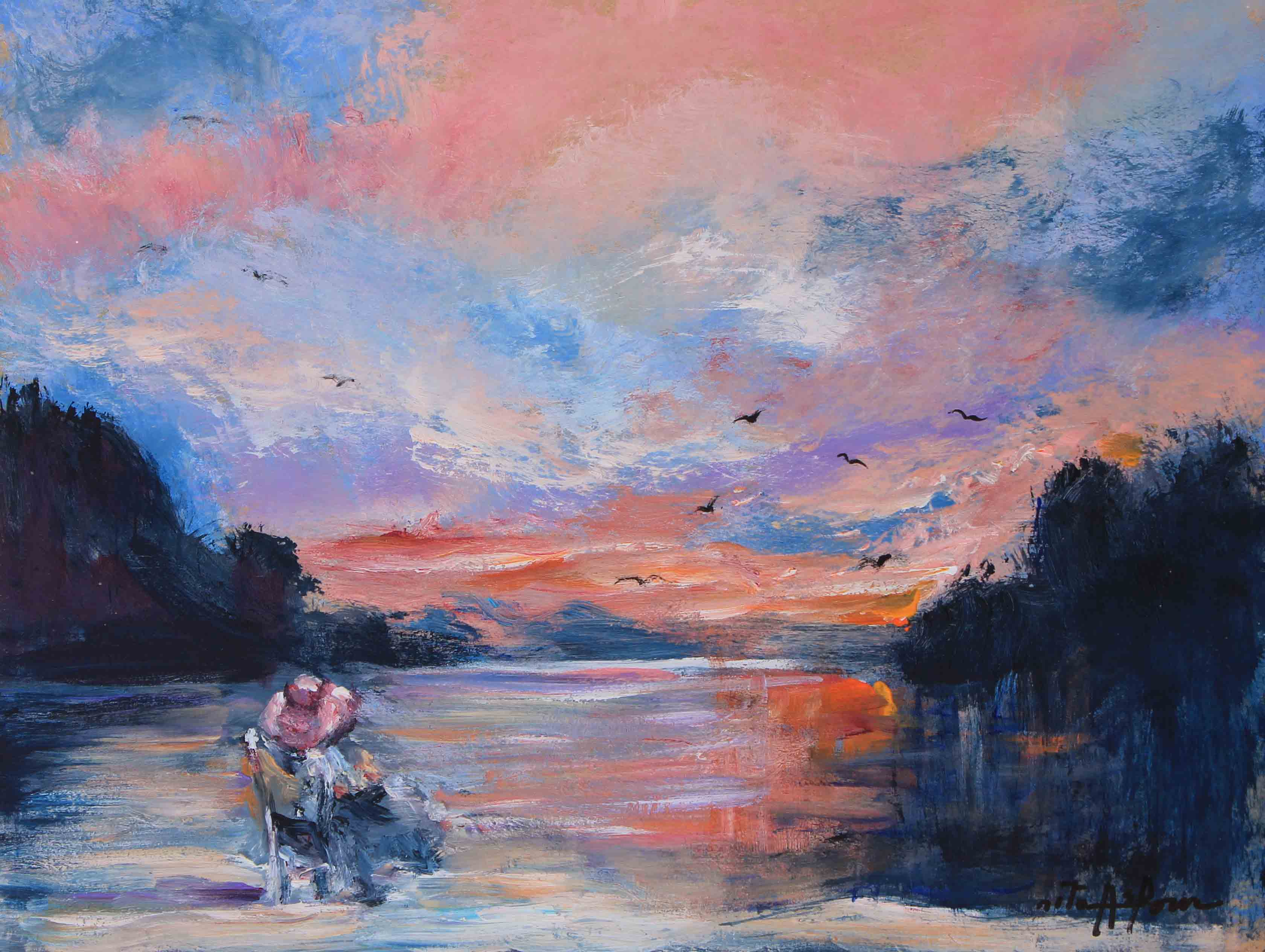
Alone Counting Seagulls, October 25, 1996.

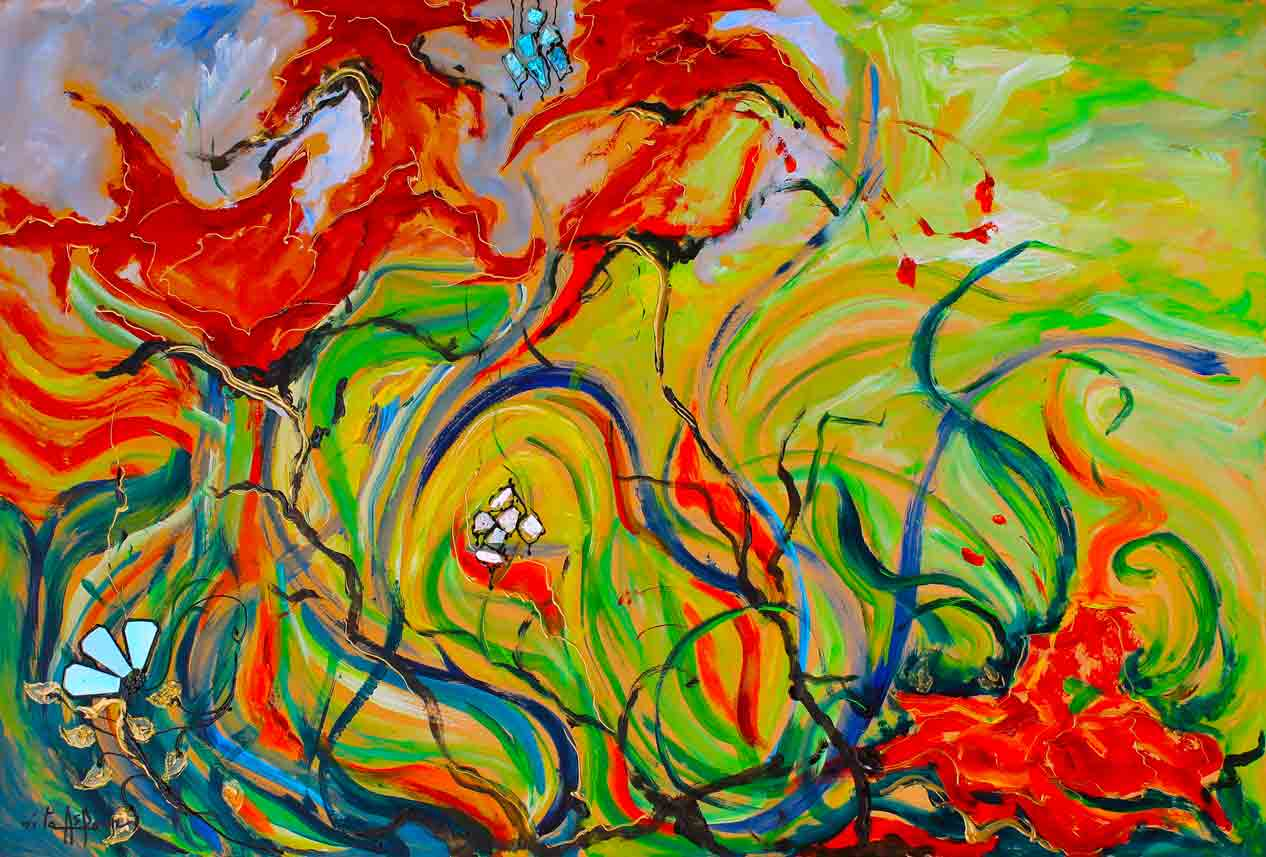
Colorful Inferno, abstract painting, November 18, 1998.

== 2000s and 2010s ==
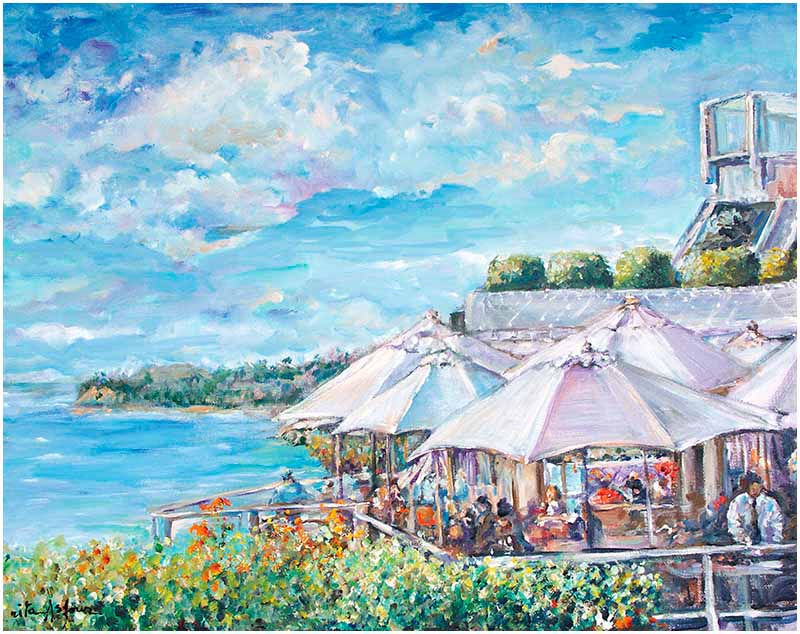
Restaurant By The Sea, acrylic on canvas, May 28, 2005.

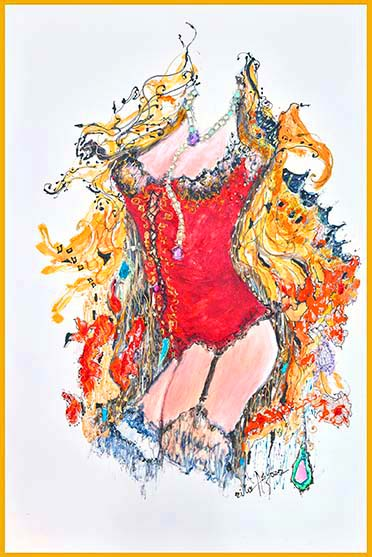
Ruby In Gold, mixed media on shining board, 2013.

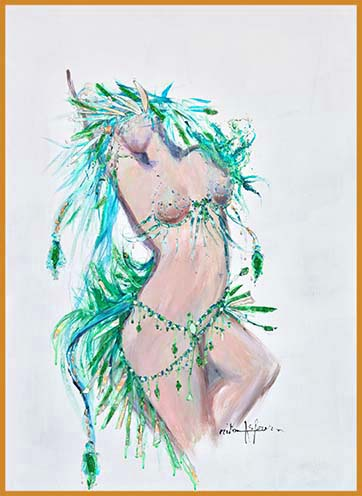
Emeralds, mixed-media on masonite board, 2016.

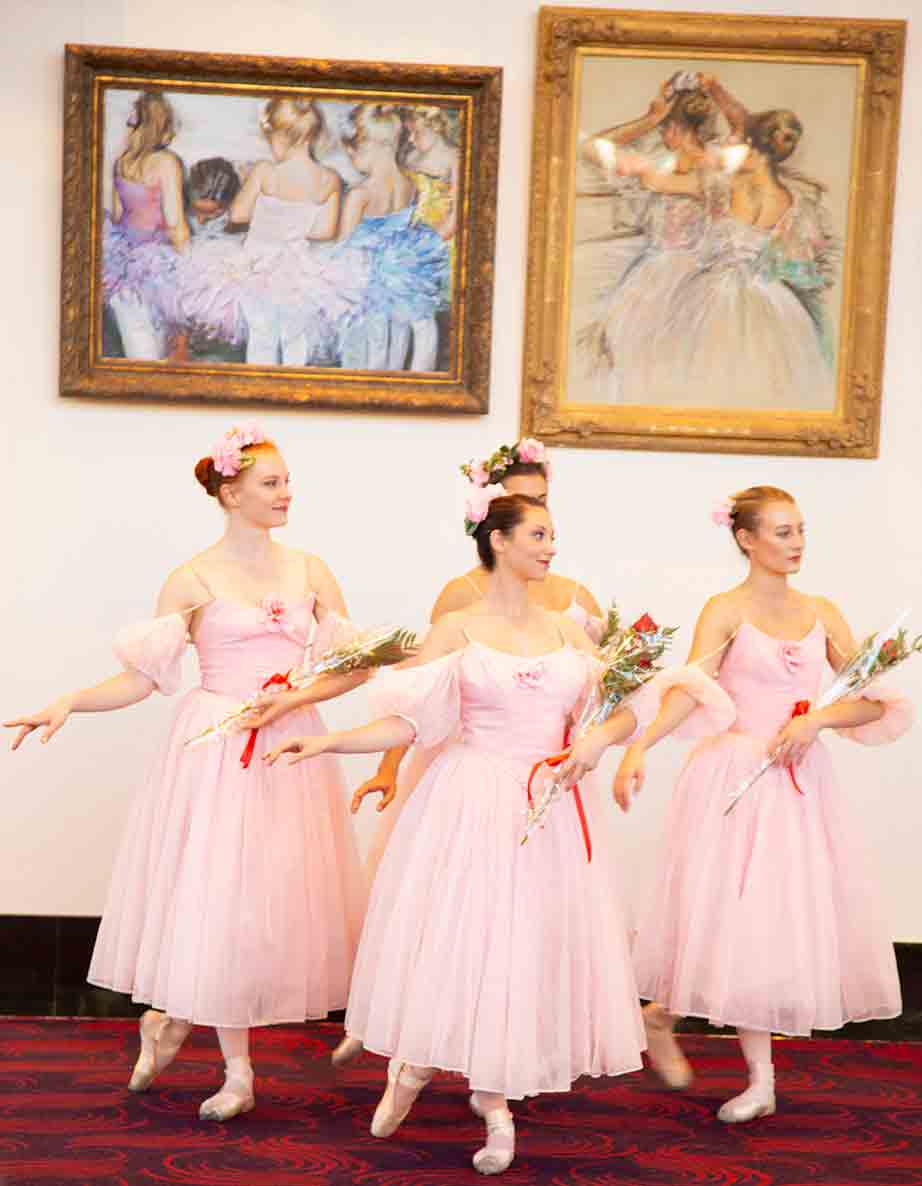
University of Nevada ballet students August 16, 2016.
