= Lists of art awards =

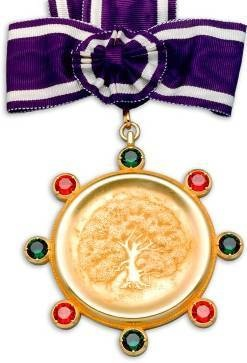
Kyoto Prize

Lists of art awards cover some of the notable awards presented for art, some for a specific form or genre, some for artists from one country or region, some more general. The lists are organized by the region of the body issuing the award, although the awards may not be restricted to artists in that region.

== Africa ==
- Absa L’Atelier Art Competition, South Africa
- Fak'ugesi Awards for Digital Creativity, South Africa

== Americas ==
=== Other ===
- Leonardo da Vinci World Award of Arts, (Mexico: World Cultural Council)
- M&C Fine Arts Awards, Saint Lucia
- Musgrave Medal, Jamaica
- Pablo Neruda Order of Artistic and Cultural Merit, Chile
- PIPA Prize, Brazil
