= Laila Shawa =

Palestinian artist (1940–2022)

- ليلى الشوا
- Born: 4 April 1940; Gaza City, Mandatory Palestine
- Died: 24 October 2022 (aged 82); London, United Kingdom
- Education: Leonardo da Vinci Art Institute, 1957–1958; Accademia di Belle Arti di Roma, 1958–1964
- Father: Rashad al-Shawa

Laila Shawa (Arabic: ليلى الشوا; April 4, 1940 – 24 October 2022) was a Palestinian visual artist. Her work has been described as a personal reflection concerning the politics of her country, particularly highlighting perceived injustices and persecution. She was one of the most prominent and prolific artists of the Arabic revolutionary contemporary art scene.

As a Palestinian living in the Gaza Strip for her formative years and the daughter of Rashad al-Shawa, activist and mayor of Gaza City, Shawa's revolutionary mindset was inculcated at a young age. Often her artwork, which included paintings, sculptures, and installations, worked with photographs that served as the base for silkscreen printing. Her work has been internationally exhibited and is displayed in many public (e.g. The British Museum) and private collections.

== Early life ==
Laila Shawa was born on 4 April 1940 in Gaza, Mandatory Palestine, eight years prior to the 1948 Nakba and the founding of the State of Israel. She had two brothers, Hammam and Aladeen. Shawa was well-educated; she attended boarding school at the Leonardo da Vinci Art Institute in Cairo from 1957 to 1958, then went to the Accademia di Belle Arti di Roma in Rome from 1958 to 1964, while also studying during the summers at the School of Seeing in Salzburg, Austria.

In 1965, after finishing her schooling, Shawa returned to Gaza and directed arts and crafts classes in several refugee camps. She then continued to teach an art class for a year with UNESCO's education program. She then moved to Beirut, Lebanon in 1967 for a total of nine years and was a full-time painter. After the Lebanese Civil War began, she returned to Gaza and with assistance from both her father and husband, Shawa founded the Rashad Shawa Cultural Centre, which opened in 1992 and was destroyed by Israel in 2023.

== Hands of Fatima (1992) ==
The painting Hands of Fatima was created by Shawa in 1992. The height of the painting is eighty-nine centimeters high, and the width is seventy centimeters long. The museum number of this piece is 1992,0414,0.1, and is currently not on display. It is positioned in a vertical composition. Shawa employed oil and acrylics on canvas. The background of the painting is dark with a yellow moon crescent, but it is paralleled with bright and vibrant colors of women in niqabs with unique patterns. Their eyes filled in black, and there are open hands that have the sign of the evil eye, and have painted henna designs. The painting considered to be in a Middle East and North African Modern Art style.

The painting is from Shawa's series called Women and Magic that reconnoiters a common practice of magic and witchcraft in the Middle East. This opens the discussion on how people govern their destiny to unknown powers, and that the things people do come from a mysterious authority outside their own control. Moreover, the hands in the painting are covered in henna and has the evil eye attached to it. According to Nadir Yurtoğlu in History Studies: International Journal of History, the evil eye is a belief in many cultures in which, through envy, people can cause harm to one another. The women in the painting are also veiled, and in an interview with Muslima, Shawa explained how the veil is what she terms as a Bidaa, something which was introduced to Islam, but has nothing to do with Islamic teachings rather than a sociopolitical spectacle created to subdue women. So, the women in this piece are essentially affected by that sociopolitical endeavor.

In the book, The Origins of Palestinian Art, the authors Bashir Makhoul and Gordon Hon present the ways in which Palestinian artists have altered a lot of the most intriguing approaches of contemporary art in ways that seem to carry these approaches into direct engagement with a very tangible and crucial political struggle. In this case, Shawa is presenting to her audience the political struggle of being a Palestinian Muslim woman living in occupied Palestinian state, and relying on higher powers to carry their existence and faith.

== Artistic career ==
In an interview with the Princeton University Art Museum, Shawa was asked what it is that inspires her, to which she responded, "My inspiration is my direct experiences. It's usually what I see, what's around me, so it is contemporary. I prefer to do the present, now, with issues that are very relevant...my artwork is a very creative process, a mixture of intellectual processes, observations, and I think it out very thoroughly." Shawa's more thoughtful and creative approach in producing art is seen in all her various forms of artwork: painting, print, and installation. The overall configuration and detail of Islamic architecture influenced Shawa's later work as she incorporated significant cultural and ideological elements.

Shawa's first show outside of the Middle East, Women and Magic, was in London in 1992. She did not begin to find international acclaim until 1994, when she collaborated with Mona Hatoum and Balqees Fakhro in a show titled Forces of Change: Artists of the Arab World at the National Museum of Women in the Arts in Washington DC.

Her 2004 work Democracy in Red captures the anguish and horror of living under Israeli occupation. The painting was produced using acrylic, paper mache, gauze and nails and is displayed at the 60th Venice Biennale of 2024 as part of the exhibition Foreigners in their Homeland: Occupation, Apartheid, Genocide.

Her most well-known work in the 21st century is 2010's Walls of Gaza III, Fashionista Terrorista, a screen print originating from Shawa's photographs. The photo shows garments, a scarf and a sweater symbolizing Palestinian resistance, decorated with a Swarovski crystal "New York" patch to visualize how the people of the West use the Arab struggle as a fashion statement. In 2012 at London's October Gallery, Shawa's show "The Other Side of Paradise” opened, about which she stated:

"In The Other Side of Paradise, I explore the motivations behind the shahida—the Arabic term for “female suicide bomber”—a question that few people would likely choose to consider. The core of the shahida model revolves around a troubling confusion of eroticization and weaponization. In this installation, I sought to assign to each aspirant an identity and wholeness that would otherwise be denied her in the routinely horrific media reports of female suicide bombers in Gaza."

In 2012, to go alongside the AKA Peace Exhibition at the ICA, Art Below showcased selected works from the AKA Peace series on the London Underground including artwork by Shawa. "AKA Peace", originally conceived by photographer Bran Symondson and now curated by artist Jake Chapman, is an exhibition of new works made specially for the Peace One Day Project 2012, bringing together a group of contemporary artists, all of whom agreed to transform a decommissioned AK-47 assault rifle, refashioning it into artwork. For Shawa, this was no foreign object, but rather a quite common one in the West Bank. At the AKA Peace Exhibition, while standing next to her piece, she said, "I'm very familiar with AK-47s so for me it was not a very strange feeling to carry the gun, but my first question to Bran was 'how many people did this gun kill?'" Shawa entitled her glamored rifle, Where Souls Dwell, a powerful name attached to an intensely charged piece of art. It is decorated with "rhinestones and butterflies and with the barrel sprayed gold."

== Personal life and death ==
Shawa died on 24 October 2022, at the age of 82 in her home in London, United Kingdom.
