= Leonardo avicennae =

Scientific classification
- Kingdom: Animalia
- Phylum: Arthropoda
- Clade: Pancrustacea
- Class: Insecta
- Order: Lepidoptera
- Family: Crambidae
- Subfamily: Crambinae
- Tribe: Chiloini
- Genus: Leonardo
- Species: L. avicennae

Binomial name
- Leonardo avicennae Bassi, 1990

Species of moth

Leonardo avicennae is a moth in the family Crambidae. It was described by Graziano Bassi in 1990. It is found in Saudi Arabia.
