= Enrique Norten =

Mexican architect

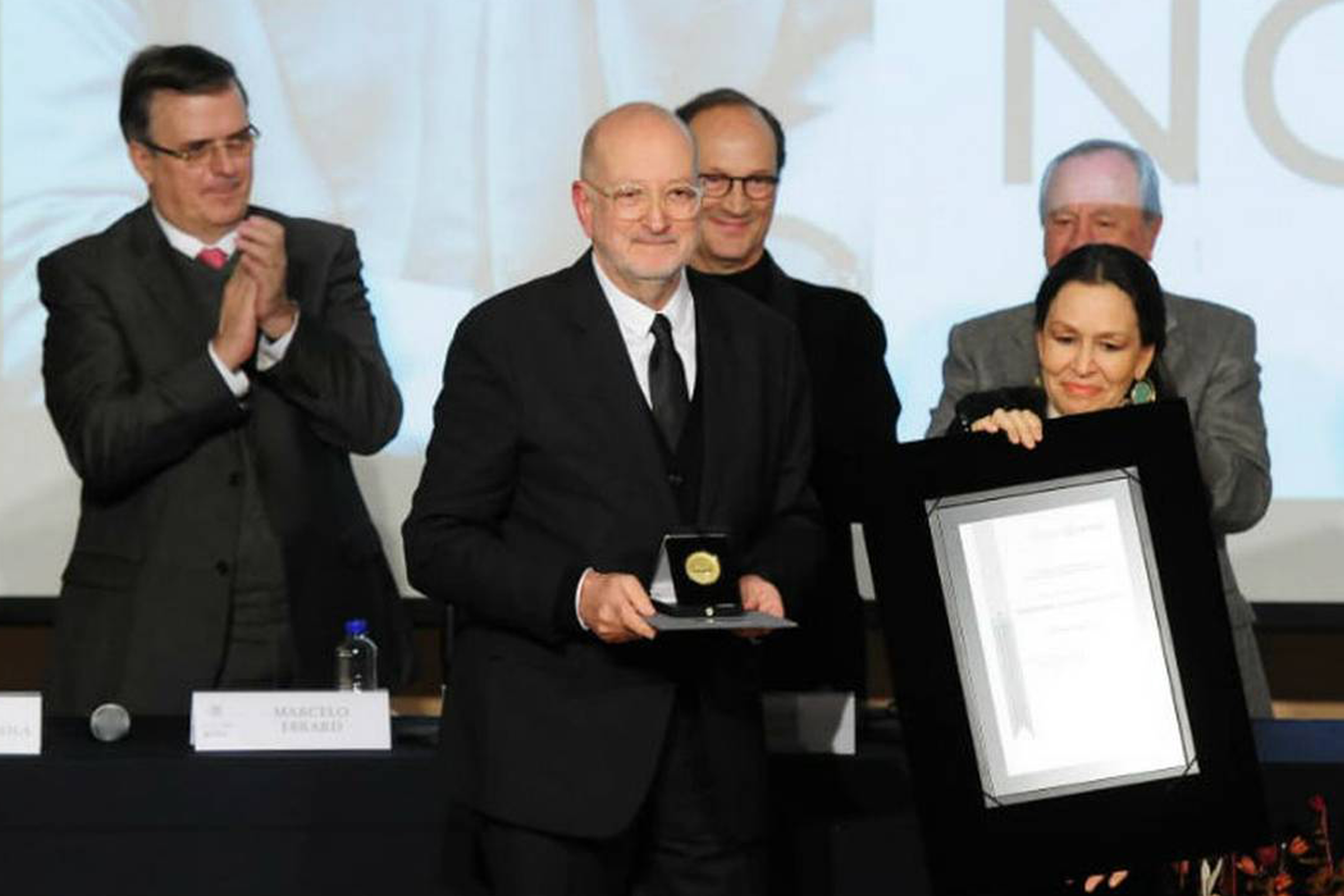
- Born: Enrique Norten Rosenfeld; February 27, 1954 (age 72); Mexico City, Mexico
- Education: Universidad Iberoamericana
- Occupation: Architect
- Awards: Leonardo da Vinci World Award of Arts (2005) First Mies van der Rohe Award recipient for Latin American Architecture (1998)
- Practice: TEN Arquitectos
- Website: www.ten-arquitectos.com

Enrique Norten Rosenfeld (born c. 1954), Hon. FAIA, is a Mexican architect and principal of the design firm TEN Arquitectos (Taller de Enrique Norten Arquitectos). Norten was born in Mexico City in 1954 where he graduated from the Universidad Iberoamericana with a degree in architecture in 1978. He obtained a Master of Architecture from Cornell University in 1980. In 1986, he founded TEN Arquitectos in Mexico City, initiating a lifelong commitment to architecture and design.

In February 2008, Enrique Norten was presented with the "Excellence in Architecture and Design Award" by PODER - Boston Consulting Group Business Awards, and in 2007 obtained the "Legacy Award" from the Smithsonian Institution for his contributions to the US arts and culture. In 2005 he received the Leonardo da Vinci World Award of Arts by the World Cultural Council and was the first Mies van der Rohe Award recipient for Latin American Architecture in 1998. Enrique Norten has lectured all over the world and has spoken at the Urban Age Conference, dedicated to shaping the thinking and practice of urban leaders and sustainable urban development through a worldwide investigation into the future of diverse cities around the world.

Throughout his career, he has balanced the practice of architecture with a constant participation on international juries and award committees such as the World Trade Center Site Memorial Competition in New York City and the Holcim Awards for Sustainable Construction. He is a board member of the Mexican Cultural Institute of New York and the Americas Society/Council of the Americas.

Enrique Norten holds the Miller Chair at the University of Pennsylvania, in Philadelphia since 1998. He has held the O'Neil Ford Chair in Architecture at the University of Texas at Austin, the Lorch Professor of Architecture Chair at the University of Michigan, and the Elliot Noyes Visiting Design Critic at Harvard University. He was Professor of Architecture at the Universidad Iberoamericana in Mexico City (1980–1990) and has served as a visiting professor at Cornell University, Parsons School of Design, Pratt Institute, SCI-ARC, Rice University, Columbia University and as Eero Saarinen Visiting professor of Architectural Design at Yale School of Architecture.

== TEN Arquitectos ==
TEN Arquitectos was founded in Mexico City by Enrique Norten in 1986; the firm opened a New York office in 2003. Since then, TEN Arquitectos has grown to over 70 members. TEN Arquitectos works across scales and typologies, including furniture and product design; single-family houses; residential, cultural, and institutional buildings; and landscape and master planning.

Construction is underway for Museo Nacional de la Energía y Tecnología -MUNET- (Mexico City); 2000 Ocean (Hallandale, Florida, USA); Centro Comunitario Bet-El (Mexico City); Hotel City Express Guadalajara (Guadalajara, Mexico); NASA Glenn Research Center (Cleveland, Ohio, USA)

Projects such as the Escuela Nacional de Teatro at the Centro Nacional de las Artes, Mexico City; Televisa Mixed Use Building, Mexico City (1st Prize "Mies Van Der Rohe Pavilion" of Latin American Architecture, Barcelona, Spain, 1998); and Hotel HABITA, Mexico City ("Latin American Building of the Year" World Architecture Awards / RIBA, London 2002; Business Week / Architectural Record Awards and AIA NY Chapter Award 2003) have established the firm as a leader in contemporary architecture.

In the past three decades, the firm's projects have been recognized with numerous awards, such as the 2009 Institute Merit Design Award from the American Institute of Architects New York Chapter for the Xochimilco Master Plan and Aquarium and a National 2009 Institute Honor Award For Regional And Urban Design from the American Institute of Architects (AIA) for the Orange County Great Park. In 2005, he was presented with the Leonardo da Vinci World Award of Arts for his valuable contributions in promoting the contemporary Mexican architecture.

The work of Enrique Norten/TEN Arquitectos has been presented on several international exhibitions such as inTENtions: Process and Variations at the Museum of Contemporary Art in Monterrey, Mexico; Old City - New Architecture at the XI St. Petersburg World Economic Forum in St. Petersburg, Russia; "La Rue Est A Nous Tous" at the Val de Seine National School of Architecture in Paris, France; "The Guggenheim Architecture" in Bonn, Germany, 2006; and the Venice Biennale in 1996, 2002, 2004 and 2006.

In addition to numerous articles on national and international publications, the work of the firm has been published on several monographs. Among the most significant are: Working: Enrique Norten/TEN Arquitectos published by the Monacelli Press in 2007; Enrique Norten: Temas y Variaciones ("Enrique Norten: Subjects and Variations") by Landucci Editores in 2004 and reprinted in 2005; and TEN Arquitectos, by the Monacelli Press New York, printed in 1998, and reprinted in 2002.
