= Leonardo (moth) =

Scientific classification
- Kingdom: Animalia
- Phylum: Arthropoda
- Clade: Pancrustacea
- Class: Insecta
- Order: Lepidoptera
- Family: Crambidae
- Subfamily: Crambinae
- Tribe: Chiloini
- Genus: Leonardo; Bleszynski, 1965

Genus of moths

Leonardo is a genus of moths of the family Crambidae.

== Species ==
- Leonardo avicennae Bassi, 1990
- Leonardo davincii Bleszynski, 1965
