= Todd Siler =

American painter

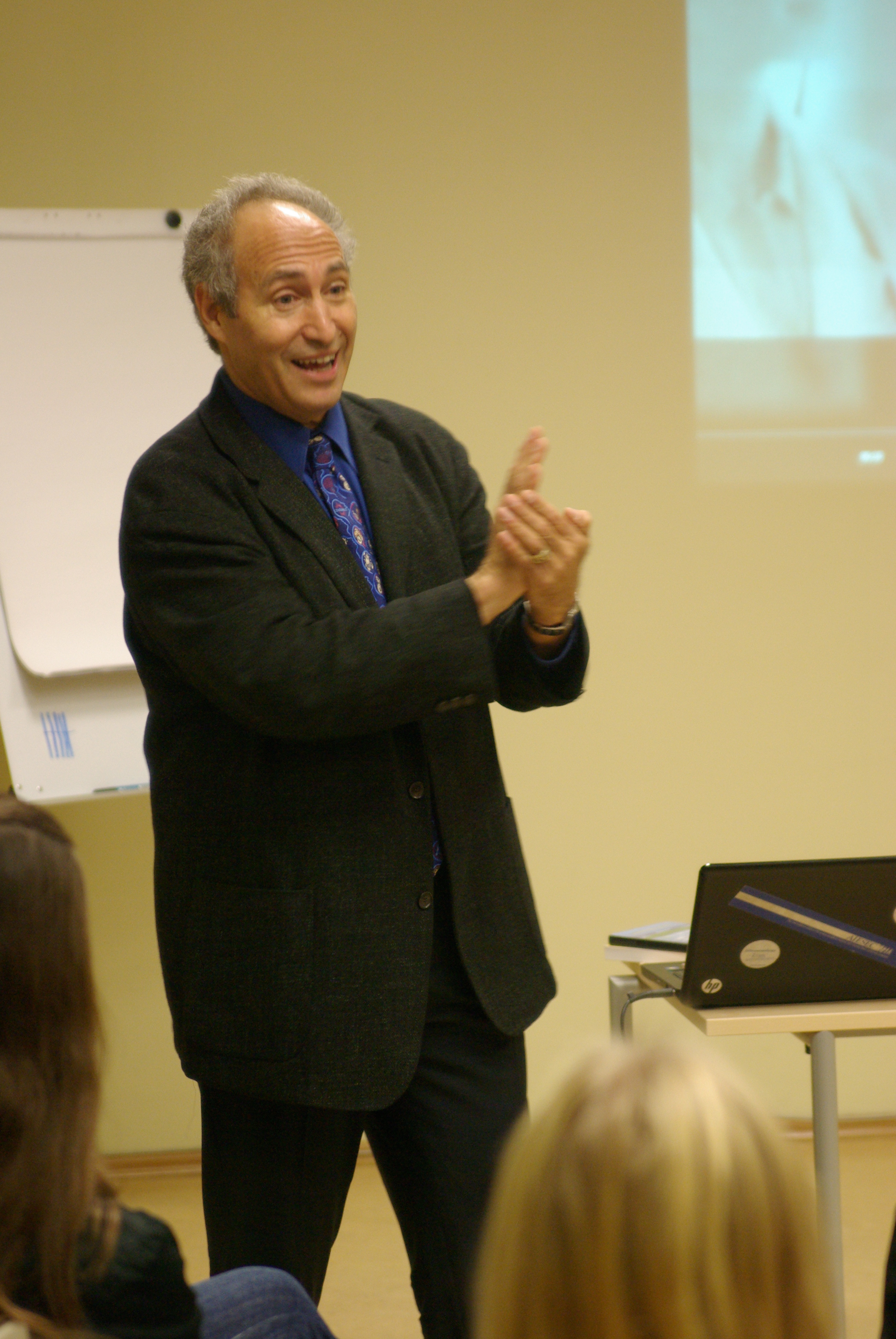
- Todd Siler in Tartu (2011)
- Awards: Leonardo da Vinci World Award of Arts (2011)
- Website: toddsilerart.com

Todd Siler is an American multimedia artist, author, educator, and inventor known for his interdisciplinary work integrating art, science, and human creativity.

== Early life and education ==
He was born in Mineola, Long Island, New York on August 21, 1953. He earned a Bachelor of Arts degree from Bowdoin College in 1975.

Siler pursued graduate studies at the Center for Advanced Visual Studies, Massachusetts Institute of Technology, where he received a Master of Science in Visual Studies in 1981. In 1986 Siler became the first visual artist to earn a Ph.D. from the Massachusetts Institute of Technology in Interdisciplinary Studies in Psychology and Art with a doctoral dissertation, titled Architectonics of Thought: A Symbolic Model of Neuropsychological Processes.

Siler began advocating the full integration of the arts and sciences in the 1970s and is the founder of the ArtScience Program for Lifelong Learning. Through his exploratory work, he helped establish the ArtScience movement—practicing integrative thinking and transdisciplinary collaborations, using both arts-based and science-based, experiential learning methods and tools for problem-solving and innovating.

== Career ==
In the late 1980s and 1990s, Siler expanded his interdisciplinary work through institutional and educational roles. He served on the Board of Directors of the Foundation for Human Potential and on the International Advisory Board of the Israel Arts and Science Academy, contributing to programs in interdisciplinary and gifted education. In 1993, he founded Psi-Phi Communications, LLC, followed by the ArtScience Program at the Museum of Outdoor Arts in 1994, where he developed educational initiatives focused on creativity and communication. His books Breaking the Mind Barrier (1990) and Think Like a Genius (1997) further established his work in creativity studies and public education.

During the late 1990s and early 2000s, Siler participated in the World Economic Forum in Davos as a Cultural Leader and Forum Fellow. He also worked on patents and technological applications related to creativity, innovation, and cognitive processes. During this period, he joined the Board of Directors of Open World Learning, the International Advisory Board of the World Knowledge Forum in Seoul, and continued his involvement with the Foundation for Human Potential. In 2005, he co-founded Think Like a Genius, LLC, an organization focused on creativity research and educational systems.

From the mid-2000s onward, Siler's work increasingly emphasized interdisciplinary collaboration between art, science, and education. He contributed to the development of STEAM-based educational models and participated in programs promoting innovation through the integration of artistic and scientific disciplines. In 2012, he co-founded ArtNano Innovations with chemist Geoffrey Alan Ozin, a project combining artistic visualization with nanoscience and sustainability research.

== Works ==
In the early 1980s, Siler focused on the study of creativity and the relationship between cognition, artistic production, and scientific inquiry. His work examined how neural processes and patterns of thought shape creative expression, particularly through visual art. During this period, he developed an interdisciplinary approach linking art, science, and technology, using his artworks to explore connections between neuropsychology, perception, and the creative process. This work became a foundation for his later contributions to ArtScience and creativity studies.

These theories were elaborated in two books, Breaking The Mind Barrier: The ArtScience of Neurocosmology (Simon & Schuster, 1990; Touchstone Books, 1992), which is largely intended for scholars, and Think Like A Genius (Bantam Books, 1997; Transworld, 1998) written for the general reader.

=== Visual arts ===
In his 20s Siler was part of the same SoHo art scene which launched Julian Schnabel, Francesco Clemente and David Salle. Siler's artworks are in the public collections including the Solomon R. Guggenheim Museum, The Metropolitan Museum of Art (20th Century Collection), The Museum of Modern Art in New York City, the Pushkin Museum of Fine Arts in Moscow, and The Israel Museum in Jerusalem.

Emerging in the late 1970s, Siler's early works, including the Thought Assemblies series, combined symbolic imagery with diagrammatic structures to represent the interaction between intuitive and analytical thinking. These works established his characteristic use of visual forms to model mental processes.

During the 1980s and 1990s, he expanded into large-scale mixed-media works and sculptural installations using materials such as metal, paper, and photographic elements. His works from this period often featured layered compositions he described as "metaphorms," combining organic and technological imagery influenced by neuroscience, physics, and systems theory.

In 1996, Siler had an epiphany about the field of nuclear fusion and the relentless search for the "Holy Grail" of renewable energy, he started to deeply research the different approaches used to model the sun and subsequently conceived of an alternative approach—one that, to his way of thinking, more closely modeled the general dynamics of a trillion stellar "fractal reactors" that literally make up and expand the universe. He was determined to give form to his concept. Siler spent a year writing his first concept paper that conveyed the essence of his ideas, and how they could be tested empirically. In 1999, he was invited to present his concept of the "Fractal Reactor: A New Geometry for Plasma Fusion" at the 3rd Symposium on "Current Trends In International Fusion Research, Review and Assessment" in Washington, D.C. (March 8–12). A Conference organized under the auspices of the Global Foundation, Inc. and in cooperation with the International Atomic Energy Agency (IAEA).

In 2006, Siler's multimedia exhibition at New York's Ronald Feldman Gallery presented his artwork relating to what he described as a nature-inspired "Fractal Reactor:Re-Creating the Sun", a nuclear fusion reactor based on fractal geometry.

In 2025, he presented the major solo exhibition "Metaphorming Time" at the grand opening of the Madden Gallery, Museum of Outdoor Arts in Colorado, featuring monumental mixed-media paintings and sculptural installations that explore the nature of time, consciousness, and the interconnectedness of past, present, and future.

== Awards ==
In 2011, Siler received the Leonardo da Vinci World Award of Arts in recognition of his contributions to contemporary and visual arts, for stimulating creativity, inspiring innovation, and uniting art and science to enrich the experience of creative and collaborative learning.

Earlier in his career, Siler was awarded an I.B.M. Thomas J. Watson Fellowship to Paris, France (1975-76), where he independently practiced his drawing, painting, and sculpture, using the Atelier Cesar at Ecole des Beaux-Arts as a shared studio to make his experimental, figurative clay sculptures.

In 1985-86, Siler was awarded a Fulbright Fellowship to India, where he studied the use of symbolism and allegory in Hindu and Buddhist art and architecture. He traveled throughout India researching the narrative carvings representing the tree of life, knowledge and enlightenment in the Buddhist stupas, among many other nature-inspired art.

At the International Book Fair Jerusalem in 1993, Siler was awarded the Gold Medal Award for Metaphorming Minds: Envisioning the Possibilities of Nature. His book Breaking the Mind Barrier was later nominated for the Grawemeyer Award in Education in 1994.

Siler was also recognized by the New York City Art Teachers Association as Artist of the Year in 1995. Internationally, he was selected as a Cultural Leader and Forum Fellow at the World Economic Forum in 1999 and 2001.
