= Leonardo davincii =

Scientific classification
- Kingdom: Animalia
- Phylum: Arthropoda
- Clade: Pancrustacea
- Class: Insecta
- Order: Lepidoptera
- Family: Crambidae
- Subfamily: Crambinae
- Tribe: Chiloini
- Genus: Leonardo
- Species: L. davincii

Binomial name
- Leonardo davincii Błeszyński, 1965

Species of moth

Leonardo davincii is a moth in the family Crambidae. It was described by Stanisław Błeszyński in 1965. It is found in Sudan.
