= Leonardo da Vinci World Award of Arts =

- Country: Mexico
- Presented by: World Cultural Council
- Rewards: Diploma, Commemorative Medal
- First award: 1989
- Website: consejoculturalmundial.org

The Leonardo da Vinci World Award of Arts has been established by the World Cultural Council (Mexico) to acknowledge those who offer a positive message to mankind through different expressions of art. It is conferred upon "artist, sculptor, writer, poet, cinematographer, photographer, architect, musician or other performing artist, whose work constitutes a significant contribution to the artistic legacy of the world". The award has been presented biennially since 1999.

The qualifying jury is constituted of internationally renowned artists, authorities, and members of the World Cultural Council.

The prize consists of a diploma, a commemorative medal and US$10,000.

The award is named after Leonardo da Vinci.

== Award recipients ==
Year	Recipient	Field of Research	Ceremony Host	Ceremony Site	Ceremony Host Country	Ceremony Date	Ref.
2022	Meejin Yoon	Architecture	University of Coimbra	Great Hall of Acts, "Sala dos Capelos", University of Coimbra	Portugal	29-30 November 2022	
2019	Paulo Branco	Filmography	University of Tsukuba	University of Tsukuba, Tsukuba	Japan	3-4 October 2019	
2017	Russell Hartenberger	Music	University of Toronto	Pieterskerk, Leiden, Netherlands	Netherlands	8 November 2017	
2015	Milton Masciadri	Music	University of Dundee	Caird Hall, Dundee, Scotland	United Kingdom	29 November 2015	
2013	Petteri Nisunen, Tommi Grönlund	Art	Nanyang Technological University	Nanyang Auditorium, Nanyang Technological University, Singapore	Singapore	2 October 2013	
2011	Todd Siler	Visual Arts	University of Tartu	Assembly Hall, University of Tartu, Tartu	Estonia	10 November 2011	
2009	Marcell Jankovics	Art and Philosophy	University of Liège	Salle Académique, University of Liège, Liège	Belgium	25 November 2009	
2007	Anne Moeglin-Delcroix	Art and Philosophy	Universidad Autónoma de Nuevo León	Teatro Universitario, Campus Mederos, Monterrey	Mexico	24 November 2007	
2005	Enrique Norten	Architecture	Universidad Autónoma Agraria Antonio Narro	Teatro de la Ciudad Fernando Soler, Saltillo	Mexico	12 November 2005	
2003	Otto Piene	Sculpture	University of Helsinki, Finnish Society of Sciences and Letters	National Library of Finland, University of Helsinki, Helsinki	Finland	17 November 2003	
2001	Edna Hibel	Painting	Utrecht University	Academiegebouw, Utrecht	Netherlands	21 November 2001	
1999	Magdalena Abakanowicz	Renaissance art	Norwegian University of Science and Technology	Main Building, Norwegian University of Science and Technology, Trondheim	Norway	11 November 1999	
1995	Robert Rauschenberg	Abstract art, Pop art	INBA, CONACULTA	Palacio de Bellas Artes, Mexico City	Mexico	16 December 1995	
1989	Athens Acropolis Preservation Group of Greece	Historic preservation	Massachusetts Institute of Technology	Edgerton Hall, MIT, Cambridge	United States	8 November 1989	

== See also ==
- World Cultural Council
- Albert Einstein World Award of Science
- José Vasconcelos World Award of Education
- Prizes named after people
- List of things named after Leonardo da Vinci
- Lists of art awards
