= M&C Fine Arts Awards =

The M&C Fine Arts Award is an award given to artists in Saint Lucia, currently run by the Cultural Development Foundation. The Awards began in 1979. Awards are given out in visual, literary and performing arts, and there is also a Joe Devaux Lifetime Award. The Cultural Development Foundation assumed responsibility in 2004, when M&C handed it over after twenty five years of successful recognising the contribution of individuals and groups to the artistic-scape of St. Lucia.
