= Colégio Anglo Leonardo da Vinci =

School in Brazil

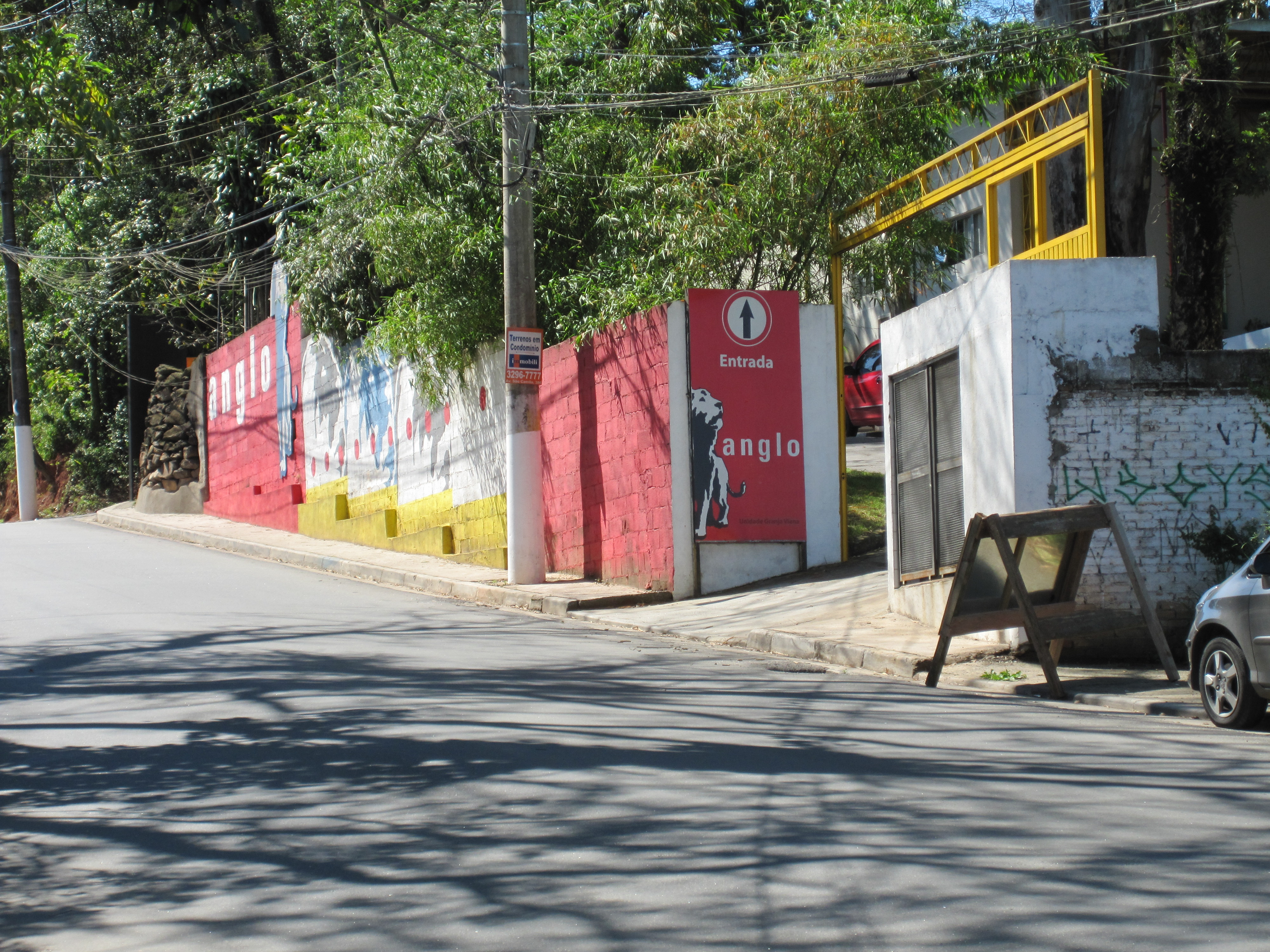
Anglo Leonardo da Vinci in Granja Viana.

Anglo Leonardo da Vinci is a subsidiary of Sistema Anglo de Ensino located to the west of São Paulo. There are four units, one in Osasco, one in Alphaville, one in Taboão da Serra and one in Granja Viana/Carapicuíba. The name "Leonardo da Vinci" was added to represent intelligence. The school had the best results of Osasco in the 2005 ENEM. Also, the Osasco, Taboão da Serra and Alphaville units were ranked as having had the 2nd, 9th and 10th best results in the 2008 ENEM among municipalities of the Greater São Paulo area, excluding São Paulo itself. In 2015, the Carapicuíba unit had the 19th best national performance at the 2014 ENEM in a ranking of 15640.

== History ==
In 1976, Joaquim Augusto Fígaro Roque, Sérgio Salvo Molina Gimeno and Wagner R. Valente founded Anglo Leonardo da Vinci in Osasco. At that time, cursinhos were available primarily in São Paulo only, although Anglo was already establishing other units in São José dos Campos, Santos and Campinas.

At first, it was only a cursinho, but in 1982, a school (also in Osasco) was founded, with high school classes only. In 1988, however, the school was extended to elementary school as well.

In 2005, more units were established in Granja Viana, Taboão da Serra and Alphaville.
