= Leonardo da Vinci Gymnasium =

- School for the Highly Gifted
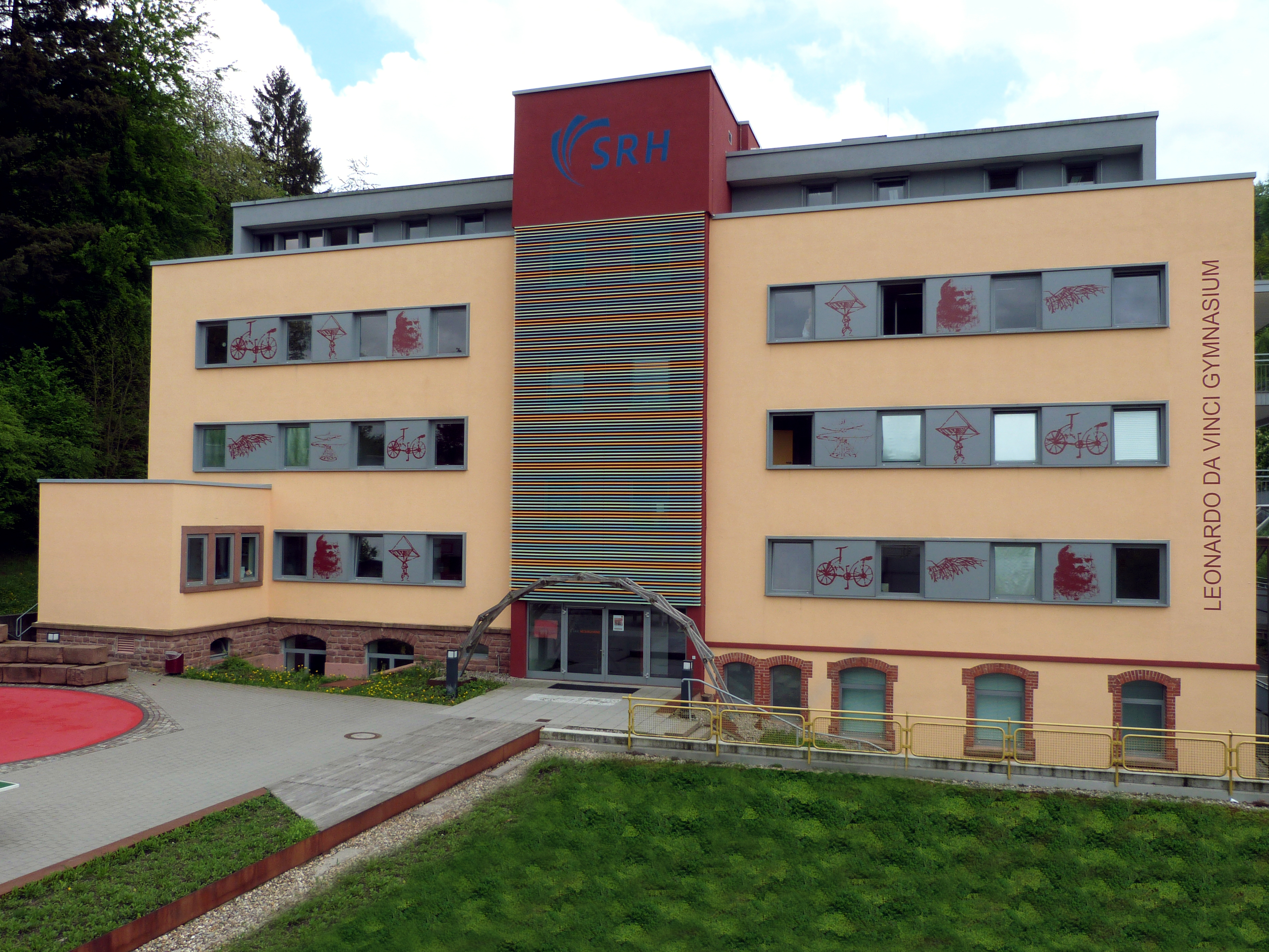

Location
- Im Spitzerfeld 25; 69151 Neckargemünd; Germany
- Coordinates: 49.38397921°N 8.80911469°E

Information
- School type: Private boarding school for highly gifted students, Gymnasium
- Established: 2004–2017
- Headmaster: Dr. Friedrich Hirsch (2004-2006), Ulrich Müller (2006-2012), Michael Knöthig (2012-2017)
- Teaching staff: 30 (2012/13)
- Years offered: 5-12
- Gender: co-educational
- Enrollment: 150 (2012/13)
- Average class size: 15
- Student to teacher ratio: 5:1
- Website: www.ldvg.de

The Leonardo da Vinci Gymnasium was a state recognized private, coeducational, full-time day and boarding school for highly gifted students located in Neckargemünd (Baden-Württemberg) run by the SRH Group, a Non-Profit organisation in Healthcare and Education. The school was one of Germany’s first private schools for intellectually gifted children from 5th grade onward and it was the first and sole private school of this kind in the state of Baden-Württemberg. The school consisted of a secondary school and a high school, which correspond to the state equivalents. Its stated aim was the promotion of the intellectual and social development of its students. In November 2016, the school announced it would be closing down after the 2016/17 school year due to declining numbers of applicants.

== Conception ==
Leonardo da Vinci Gymnasium was accredited by the Ministry of Culture and Education of the State of Baden-Württemberg and therefore required to follow the state curriculum for public schools. The school offered the same type of diplomas that public institutions provide, most importantly Abitur. The final Abitur examinations in grade 12 were identical to that in public schools.

The stated objective of the school was to promote, encourage and foster the education of gifted children. To this end the school offered accelerated and compacted classes, a wide variety of extra-curricular enrichment courses throughout various academic fields (e.g. mathematics, science and technology, languages, literature, music, visual arts, and sports) as well as integrated pull-out activities. In an interdisciplinary project in 2012 two grade 8 classes wrote a novel that has subsequently been published as a book.

Also, there was an exchange program with schools in Mexico (Guadalajara) and China (Beijing).

== Location ==
The school was located on the campus of the SRH educational centre in Neckargemünd, a home for several academic institutions, within 10 km (7 miles) distance to the city of Heidelberg. The school benefitted from shared on-campus facilities, including a computer network, an on-campus library, fully equipped science and computer laboratories. In addition, the school had access to two gyms and its own athletic ground.
