= Leonardo da Vinci Art Institute =

Former art school in Cairo, Egypt

The Leonardo da Vinci Art Institute was an Italian art institute located in Cairo, Egypt during World War II.

== History ==
The institute was founded in the 1930s to provide evening classes in painting, drawing and sculpture under the auspices of the Italian consulate in Cairo as well as the Italian cultural centre in Cairo keeping quiet about the Institute's nature and history of existence.

Most students there did not know the value of its certification nationally or internationally. It was transformed from an Italian technical high school to a higher education institute offering graduate certification in each of its two sections, Architecture and Painting/Decoration.

The institute became a school for Egyptian society's elites primarily Cairo's elite. Upper and upper middle class students with unique and independent approaches to their education who did not find an answer to their educational needs in the Egyptian high school system entered a special, individual, and nurturing environment in the institute.

The institute had teachers and instructors, some of whom were from the old Italian traditional fascist era. Teachers escaping the turmoil in their homeland and others were purposely placed at this location by a hierarchy to protect and conserve their traditional treasures during turbulent times in Europe.

== Relationship with Dante Alighieri Institute ==
It was also speculated not documented that it was created under the auspices of the Dante Alighieri Society, which was established in Rome in 1889 to "preserve and spread the Italian language and culture in the world". In Egypt, its first committees were born in Alexandria and in Cairo in 1896.

During the first postwar period, the head office in Cairo started to promote and to teach Italian arts and literature to hundreds of students in Cairo, Alexandria and Suez. In the aftermath of World War II, the Dante Alighieri Institute restarted its activities and opened the Claudio Monteverdi Conservatoire.
