= Art education in the United States =

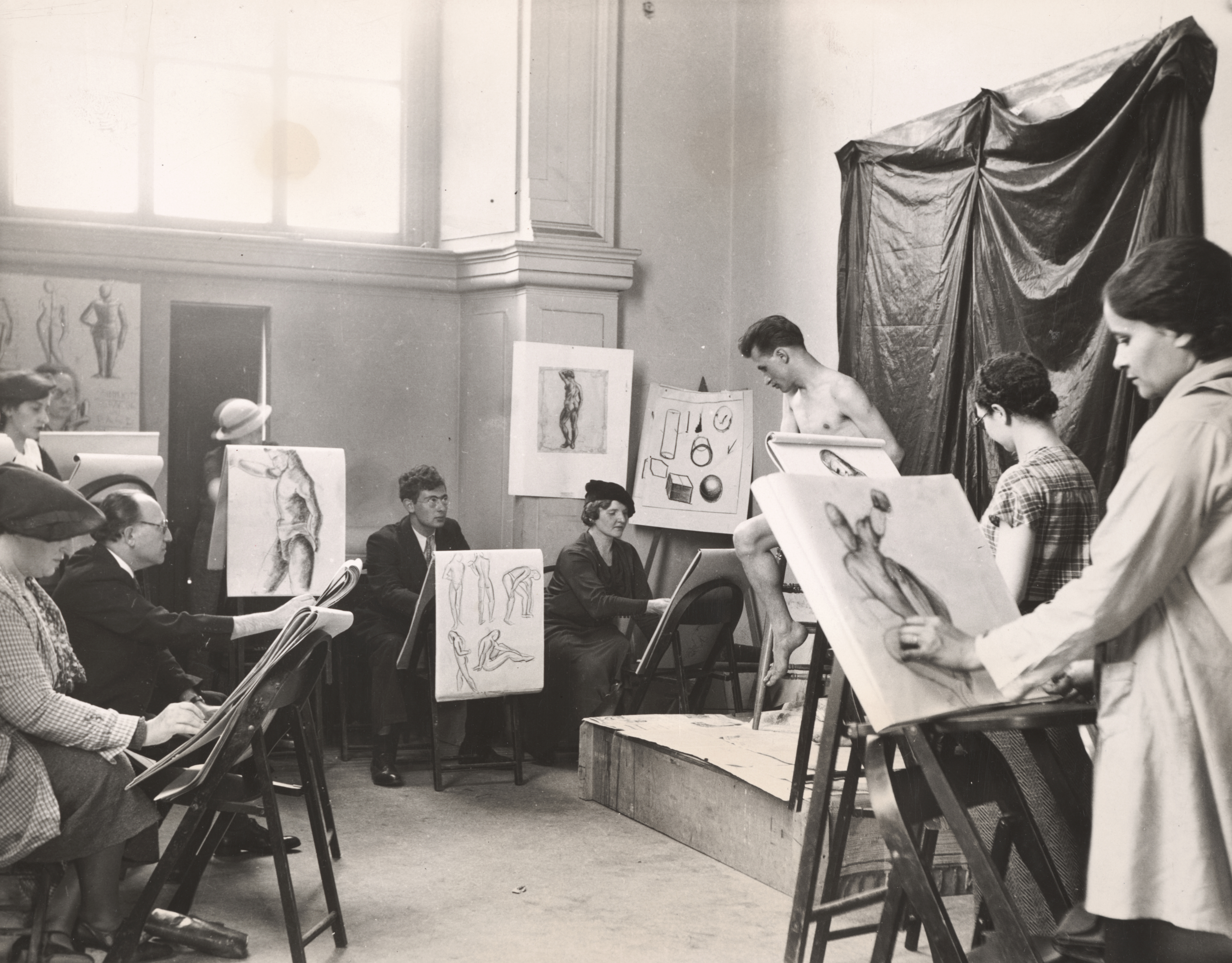
Adult art class at the Brooklyn Museum in 1935.

Art education in the United States refers to the practice of teaching visual art in American public schools. Before the democratization of education, particularly as promoted by educational philosopher John Dewey, apprenticeship was the traditional route for attaining an education in art. Alongside John Dewey, Elliot Eisner was a leading advocate for the inclusion of art in modern curriculum. Since the first introduction of art in public schooling in 1821, art education in the United States has faced many changes and many stages of growth.

== Early art education in the United States ==
Art education was first introduced to public schooling in 1821 as a result of the need for architectural designers during the Industrial Revolution. As public schooling began to grow nationwide, so did subjective interest in art instruction. In the 1870's, some states began to provide funds to their public schools in pursuit of developing art curriculum. Around this time, art materials, like paint and paper, began to improve in quality, allowing art instruction to expand beyond classic methods.

Art apprenticeships began to lose commonality in the 19th century, and independent art schools became the main path for pursuing a career in art.

== Picture study movement, before World War II ==
Art appreciation in America accelerated with the "picture study movement" in the late 19th century. Picture study was an important part of the art education curriculum. Attention to aesthetics in the classroom led to public interest in beautifying the school, home, and community, which was known as “Art in Daily Living”. The idea was to bring culture to the child to in turn change the parents.

Picture study was made possible by the improved technologies of reproduction of images, growing public interest in art, the Progressive Movement in education, and growing numbers of immigrant children who were more visually literate than they were in English. The type of art included in the curriculum was from the Renaissance onward, but nothing considered “modern art” was taught. Often, teachers selected pictures that had a moral message. This is because a major factor in the development in aesthetics as a subject was its relationship to the moral education of the new citizens due to the influx of immigrants during the period. Aesthetics and art masterpieces were part of the popular idea of self culture, and the moralistic response to an artwork was within the capabilities of the teacher, who often did not have the artistic training to discuss the formal qualities of the artwork.

A typical Picture Study lesson was as follows: Teachers purchased materials from the Perry Picture Series, for example. This is similar to the prepackaged curriculum we have today. These materials included a teacher's picture that was larger for the class to look at together, and then smaller reproduction approximately 2 ¾” by 2” for each child to look at. These were generally in black and white or sepia tone. Children would often collect these cards and trade them much like modern day baseball cards. The teacher would give the students a certain amount of information about the picture and the artist who created it, such as the picture's representational content, artist's vital statistics, and a few biographical details about the artist. These were all included in the materials so an unskilled teacher could still present the information to his or her class. Then the teacher would ask a few discussion questions. Sometimes suggestions for language arts projects or studio activities were included in the materials.

The picture study movement died out at the end of the 1920s as a result of new ideas regarding learning art appreciation through studio work became more popular in the United States.

== Since World War II ==
Since World War II, artist training has become the charge of colleges and universities and contemporary art has become an increasingly academic and intellectual field. Prior to World War II an artist did not need a college degree. Since that time the Bachelor of Fine Arts and then the Master of Fine Arts became recommended degrees to be a professional artist. This change was facilitated by the passage of the G.I. Bill in 1944, which allowed many World War II veterans to attend school, art school included.

With the expansion of university art departments, independent art schools began to lose popularity. Students pursuing a career in art began enrolling at universities, rather than independent art schools, such as the Art Students League, known for artists like Jackson Pollock and Mark Rothko. By the 1960s, the School of Visual Arts, Pratt Institute, Cooper Union, Princeton and Yale had emerged as leading American art universities.

Currently, the PhD in studio art is under debate as the new standard for a degree in professional art. Although, as of 2008, there are only two United States programs offering a PhD in studio art, PhDs in art are commonplace in the UK, Scandinavia, and the Netherlands. As James Elkins, the chair of the department of art history, theory and criticism at the School of the Art Institute of Chicago as well as the chair of the department of art history at the University of Cork in Ireland wrote in Art in America, "By the 1960s the MFA was ubiquitous. Now the MFA is commonplace and the PhD is coming to take its place as the baseline requirement for teaching jobs". This is in reference to teaching positions for studio art at the college level. The PhD has been a standard requirement to be a professor of art education for many years. In his forthcoming book, Artists with PhD's, James Elkins presents the opinion the PhD will become the new standard, and offers the book as a resource for assessing these programs and for structuring future programs. However, the College Art Association still recognizes the MFA as the terminal degree, stating "At this time, few institutions in the United States offer a PhD degree in studio art, and it does not appear to be a trend that will continue or grow, or that the PhD will replace the MFA".

== Discipline-based art education in the early 1980s ==
Discipline-based art education (DBAE) is an educational program formulated by the J. Paul Getty Trust in the early 1980s. DBAE supports a diminished emphasis on studio instruction, and instead promotes education across four disciplines within the arts: aesthetics, art criticism, art history and art production. It does retain a strong tie to studio instruction with an emphasis on technique.

Among the objectives of DBAE are to make arts education more parallel to other academic disciplines, and to create a standardized framework for evaluation. It was developed specifically for grades K-12 but has been instituted at other levels of education. DBAE advocates that art should be taught by certified teachers, and that "art education is for all students, not just those who demonstrate talent in making art".

Criticism of DBAE is voiced from postmodern theorists who advocate for a more pluralistic view of the arts, and inclusion of a diverse range of viewpoints that may not be included in a standardized curriculum.

== Art education since the 2000s ==
Current art education widely varies from state to state. As of 2018, 29 of the 50 states consider art a core academic subject. 41 states, however, require that art classes be offered at the elementary, middle, and high school levels. Art magnet schools, common in larger communities, use art(s) as a core or underlying theme to attract those students motivated by personal interest or with the intention of becoming a professional or commercial artist.

Despite state requirements, budget cuts and increasing test-based assessments of children, as required by the federal government's No Child Left Behind (NCLB) act, are credited for the reported loss of art instruction time in schools. The NCLB retains the arts as part of the "core curriculum" for all schools, but it does not require reporting any instruction time or assessment data for arts education content or performance standards, which is reason often cited for the decline of arts education in American public schools. Although the number of art educators stayed the same, fewer art classes were taught because art educators were required to teach other subjects such as language arts and math.

== History of art education provisions ==
In the 1970s, provisions for arts in education were limited, at the discretion of individual states. Local schools, school boards, and districts were the main actors in deciding whether arts education was provided. Where art education was offered, it consisted of exposure-based experiences with cultural organizations outside of the school and was not integrated into the classroom curriculum. In the next couple of decades, budget cuts as a result of fiscal crises heavily stripped school budgets to the point where positions for art teachers were essentially eliminated in order to retain core subjects. At this time, the arts were seen as nonessential to the development of critical thinking and there did not exist a standard curriculum for teaching art in public schools. As such, provisions were scarce if at all present in the 1980s and 1990s.

However, the significance of an arts education emerged as data found academic performance improvements and socio-emotional and socio-cultural benefits, among other positive effects, stemming from the stimulative nature of the arts. Key players in advocating for and providing art education included a blend of public entities (schools, government agencies, etc.), private organizations, and community centers.

This emerging acknowledgment of the importance of art education was matched by a decline in provisions at the beginning of the 21st century. With the implementation of NCLB, public schools prioritized meeting Academic Performance Index (API) growth targets, downgrading the emphasis on non-core subjects. For example, in California public schools, while enrollment increased by 5.8% from 1999 to 2004, music education decreased by 50% in the same 5-year period. On a national level, data from the Surveys of Public Participation in the Arts (SPAAs) showed that in 2008, 18-24-year-olds were less likely to have had an arts education than in 1982. Low-income and low-performing public schools disproportionately struggled with this decline, and African-American and Latino students are generally less able to access the arts when compared to their White counterparts.

These findings of drastic declines in art education provisions spurred efforts for reinvestment. The NEA declared goals including maximizing investment impact, collaboration with local education across levels of government, and offering guidance and leadership support for art education.

Today, funding for education in the United States comes from three levels; local level, state level, and federal level. The whole system of education is kept in the hands of the public sector for control and to avoid any mishandling. Recently, the U.S. Department of Education began awarding Arts in Education Model Development and Dissemination grants to support organizations with art expertise in their development of artistic curricula that helps students to better understand and retain academic information. One such model of education was created in 2006 by the Storytellers Inc. and ArtsTech (formerly Pan-Educational Institute). The curricula and method of learning is titled AXIS.

== National organizations ==
The National Endowment for the Arts (NEA) is one of the many nationally recognized organizations promoting arts education in the United States. Since its formation in 1965, the NEA has led efforts in integrating the arts as a part of the core education for all K-12 students. These efforts include collaborating in state, federal, and public-private partnerships to solicit and provide funding and grants for programs in arts education. During the 2008 fiscal year, the NEA awarded over 200 grants totaling $6.7 million to programs that allow students to engage and participate in learning with skilled artists and teachers. The NEA has initiated a number of other arts education partnerships and initiatives, which include:

- The Arts Education Partnership (AEP) convenes forums to discuss topics in arts education, publishes research materials supporting the role of arts education in schools, and is a clearinghouse for arts education resource materials.
- The Strategic National Arts Alumni Project (SNAAP) is an ongoing, online survey system will collect, track, and disseminate data on alumni, and will help institutions to better understand how students use arts training in their careers and other aspects of their lives.
- The NEA Education Leaders Institute (ELI) convenes key decision makers to enhance the quality and quantity of arts education at the state level. Each institute gathers teams of school leaders, legislators, policymakers, educators, professional artists, consultants, and scholars from up to five states to discuss a shared arts education challenge and engage in strategic planning to advance arts education in their respective states.

There are a variety of other National organizations promoting arts education in the United States. These include Americans for the Arts which features major projects such as The Arts. Ask For More. national arts education public awareness campaign, Association for the Advancement of Arts Education, The College Art Association and The National Art Education Association.

== Arts integration ==
Arts integration is another and/or alternative way for the arts to be taught within schools. Arts integration is the combining of the visual and/or performing arts and incorporating them into the everyday curriculum within classrooms. Learning in a variety of ways allows for students to use their eight multiple intelligences as described by theorist Howard Gardner in his Frames of Mind: Theory of Multiple Intelligences. The eight multiple intelligences include bodily-kinesthetic, intrapersonal, interpersonal, linguistic, logical-mathematical, musical, naturalist, and spatial. Arts integration is especially important today when some schools no longer have or have small arts education programs due to significant budget cuts, including the federal budget agreement that took 1 dollar from the NEA, the United States' largest public arts funder, in 2011.

Arts integration in common core subjects creates positive academic and social effects on students. Integrating the arts into the classroom is a great way to engage students who are otherwise uninterested in common core curriculum. Additionally, disadvantaged and at-risk students are exceptionally highly impacted by arts integration. The integration of the arts helps these students in the classroom by improving their ability to practice effective communication, give them a better attitude towards school, lowering their frequency of inappropriate behavior in class, and increase their overall academic abilities.

== Digital art education ==
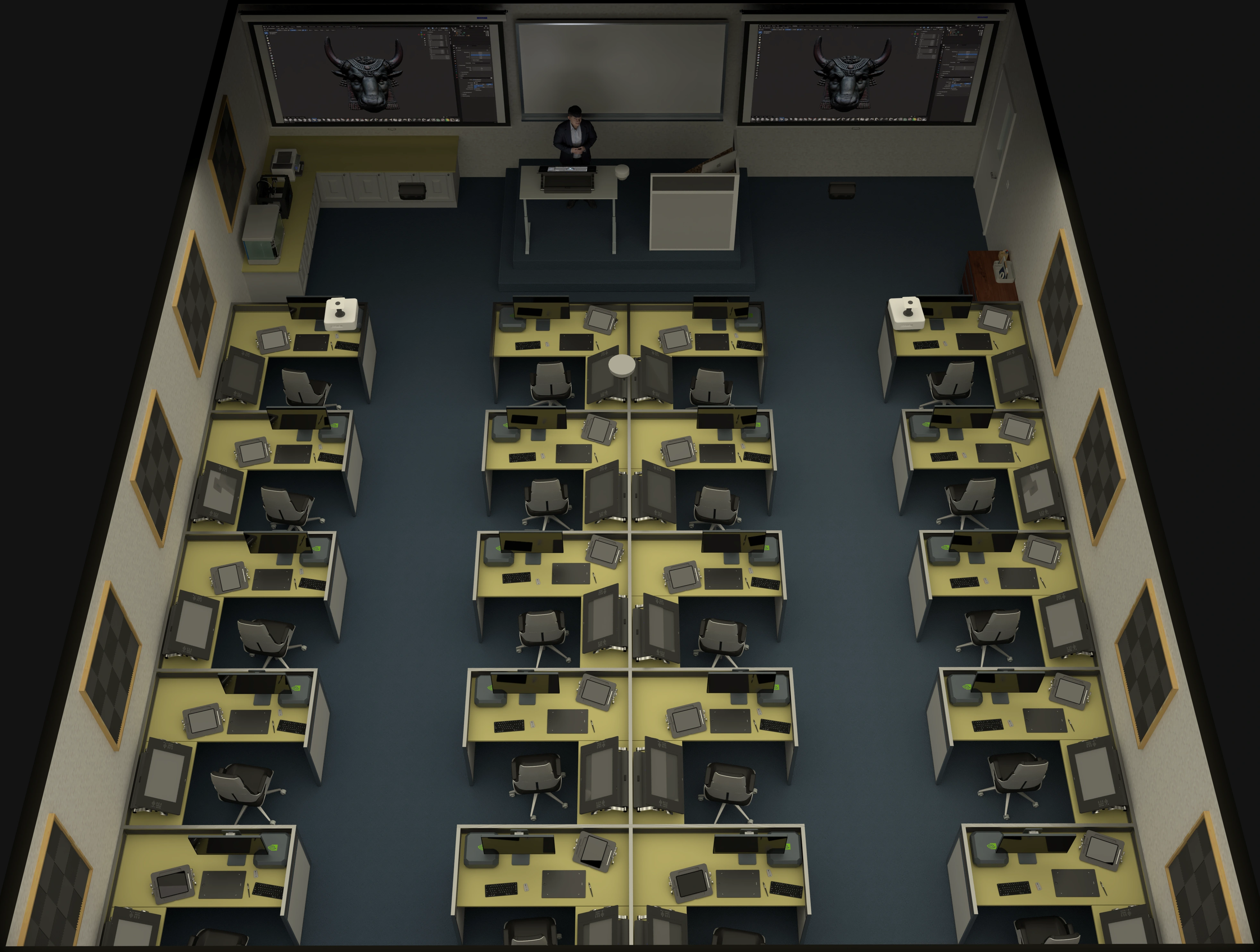
3D design of a digital art classroom with graphics tablets, tablets, and styluses at digital art workstations.

Digital art education has become more common with the advancement of digital hardware and software. From hardware such as graphics tablets, styluses, tablets, 3D scanners, virtual reality headsets, and digital cameras; to software such as digital art software, 3D modeling software, 3D rendering, digital sculpting, 2D graphics software, digital painting, 3D terrain generation, 2D animation software, 3D animation software, raster graphics editors, and video editing software.

== See also ==
- Art education
- Art schools
- Arts in education
- Arts integration
- Arts-based environmental education
- Performing arts education
- Visual arts education
- Visual arts of the United States
