= Arts integration =

Term

Arts integration differs from traditional education by its inclusion of both the arts discipline and a traditional subject as part of learning (e.g. using improvisational drama skills to learn about conflict in writing.) The goal of arts integration is to increase knowledge of a general subject area while concurrently fostering a greater understanding and appreciation of the fine and performing arts. The John F. Kennedy Center for the Performing Arts defines arts integration as "an approach to teaching in which students construct and demonstrate understanding through an art form. Students engage in a creative process which connects an art form and another subject and meets evolving objectives in both."

== History of arts education and arts integration ==
Arts integration is related to arts education in schools. Arts education, while existing in different forms during the 19th century, gained popularity as part of John Dewey's Progressive Education Theory. The first publication that describes a seamless interplay between the arts and other subjects (arts integration) taught in American schools was Leon Winslow's The Integrated School Art Program (1939). For the remainder of the 20th century, arts education's role in public schools ebbed and flowed with the country's political leanings and financial well-being.

According to Liora Bresler, during the 1970s and 1980s, two advocates for arts integration emerged: Harry Broudy and Elliot Eisner. Broudy advocated for the arts on the basis of strengthening the imagination. Broudy viewed imagination as an essential component of learning that should be cultivated in schools, and he advocated for the integration of aesthetic education into all subject matters in his work, Enlightened Cherishing. Eisner followed Broudy, citing that the arts were important to varying types of cognition. He believed that arts brought about a deeper understanding of the world due to their interactivity—the arts move learning beyond what is written or read.

Cassandra B. Whyte emphasized the importance of artistic experiences for students to encourage creative and independent thought processes that would be important throughout an individual's lifetime. The arts helped students with problem solving and decision making and those processing experiences could be adapted in general life situations. Whyte advocated including aspects of art education with locus of control identification counseling experiences to help higher education students develop confidence in their unique problem solving abilities in the classroom and in life.

Formerly, No Child Left Behind legislation describes arts education as "essential to every child's education," and include it as one of the Core Subjects. No Child Left Behind legislation also emphasizes accountability through assessment (often taking the form of the standardized test.) While no standardized assessment has been mandated in any of the arts, the need for academic accountability in the arts, as well as in other academic subject areas, has led to increased research on and advocacy of arts integration and its impact on student learning.

Currently, Common Core and close adaptions of it are changing the way schools approach learning. Common Core's approach to art integration is that it enhances education by making learning interesting and fun. With Common Core becoming the norm for many school districts through the United States, teachers are integrating art into the classroom now more than ever. The rise of popularity in art integration has increased the amount of resources available to include the classroom, making it easier than ever to use art integration in the classroom.

== Arts integration research and advocacy ==
Arts advocacy discourse currently presents two main opposing views in support of arts in education. The first points to economic grounds that art teaches "21st-century skills" like collaboration and innovation, which are necessary only as a means to breed productivity for the growth of the market. The second, alternative approach focuses instead on the philosophical value of creative inquiry that art instills in students, arguing lifelong development with no end in mind as a necessary habit borne out of an arts education. Tension between the utilitarian, workplace-focused view and the educational, growth-centered framework on advocacy continues to shape and reshape the arts education universe as revisions to the National Core Arts Standards reflect fluctuations in advocacy rhetoric.

=== Key players ===
The impetus for the arts integration is a growing body of research that demonstrates how learners experience success when taught why and how to use music, visual art, drama/dance, theatre and the literary arts to both express and understand ideas, thoughts and feelings. Critical Links, a compendium published by the Arts Education Partnership (AEP), includes 62 studies which examine the relationship between arts learning, academic achievement, and social development of students. Highlights include studies which explore the use of drama to increase students' reading comprehension and studies which examine the relationship between music and math concepts. The Arts Education Partnership has also published The Third Space, which profiles ten arts-integrated schools across the United States.

Another American organization conducting research in arts integration is the Chicago Arts Partnerships in Education. It has published, through Lawrence Erlbaum Associates, Renaissance in the Classroom: Arts Integration and Meaningful Learning. The book, edited by Gail Burnaford, Ph.D, former professor at Northwestern University and current professor at Florida Atlantic University; Cynthia Weiss, teaching artist and former CAPE associate (2000 to 2002); and Arnold Aprill, CAPE's Founding & Creative Director, combines the contributions of two-hundred seventy-two participants in CAPE's arts integration partnerships. James Catterall, arts education researcher and professor at University of California, Los Angeles's Graduate School of Education and Information Studies, has collaborated with CAPE on publications.

Harvard University's Graduate School of Education supports Project Zero, an educational research group founded in 1967 by Nelson Goodman, which investigates learning in the arts. Former directors of Project Zero include David Perkins and Howard Gardner. Currently, it is directed by Steve Seidel, and has expanded its research in arts learning to include other branches of education. Howard Gardner's Theory of multiple intelligences has been used as part of the rationale for the use of integrated arts models in teaching and learning.

For over 30 years, the John F. Kennedy Center for the Performing Arts in Washington, D.C., has been offering arts integration learning opportunities for educators. Locally, through its Changing Education Through the Arts (CETA) program, the Kennedy Center provides professional learning for Washington, D.C. area educators that are implementing arts integration in their classrooms or teaching about an art form. To develop a school-wide culture of arts integration, a network of CETA schools partner with the Kennedy Center to engage their teachers in in-depth professional learning focused on arts integration. The CETA program has added to the research about the impact of arts integration on students, teachers, and school culture through multiple evaluation studies. To reach educators throughout the nation, the Kennedy Center hosts an annual Arts Integration Conference, in which educators actively explore arts integration concepts and strategies. The Kennedy Center’s online resource, ARTSEDGE, also hosts a web series of arts integration resources that explain the ‘what’ and ‘why’ of arts integration, provides examples of arts integration in practice, and links to a range of resources. A series of Kennedy Center Seminars for Teaching Artists that focus on arts integration, as well as practices for developing strong arts-integrated residencies for students and workshops for teachers are available throughout the nation. A National Seminar for Teaching Artists is offered bi-annually at the Kennedy Center during the summer. Three other Kennedy Center national initiatives support practices and partnerships in arts integration and arts education: Any Given Child, Partners in Education, and VSA.

The Kennedy Center Partners in Education, headquartered in Washington, DC, is an organization that has promoted arts integration for over two decades. While The Kennedy Center does conduct research in arts learning, they also provide networking opportunities for arts education programs nationwide through The Kennedy Center Alliance for Arts Education Network KCAAEN. This organization advocates for arts education, fosters collaboration between artists and schools to support arts learning, develops and conducts professional development in arts education for teachers, and recognizes achievement in the arts.

Since the 1980s, Lesley University in Cambridge, MA, has been educating classroom teachers across the US in the implementation of arts integration through a professional development master's degree program. A 2012 research study, funded by the Ford Foundation, has found that teachers who graduate from the program and integrate the arts into their teaching are more resilient and remain committed to their profession. Their students engage in deep learning through arts integrated activities, leading to a greater interest in school.

The College of Education at University of South Florida Sarasota-Manatee located in Sarasota, FL, has adopted arts-integration across of all its educator preparation programs, providing training for teachers, leaders, and specialists who take on educational roles in their careers. Through its Center for Partnerships for Arts-Integrated Teaching (PAInT), the College conducts research and service activities that benefits their students and the entire region.

ArtsNow provides professional development training for educators, focused on building the skills needed to integrate arts across the curriculum. Through the innovative Foundational Training course, teachers learn to identify opportunities to integrate all art forms - visual, dance, and music - into lessons in all class subjects for grades K-12, meeting both state and national curriculum standards (including Common Core standards). ArtsNow offers free Ignite Curriculum Guides through its website.

EducationCloset provides professional development in arts integration and innovation in teaching. With an annual Arts Integration conference, Arts Integrated Curriculum, courses, webinars and publications available, teachers, artists, arts educators, administrators, and arts advocates can find rigorous, high-quality resources for Arts Integration which connect to Common Core State Standards and STEM.

With a focus on the classroom practice of arts integration, a nonprofit called Arts Integration Solutions (formerly the Opening Minds through the Arts Foundation) provides professional development for teachers and program planning and implementation for schools and school districts. AiS has developed a set of tenets that are the basis for arts integration and a cycle that helps teachers develop daily lessons in math, science, reading and writing that use the arts to fully engage students. AiS has developed programming for use of arts integration in teaching the STEM subjects (science, technology, engineering and math) and Literacy.

== Art education obstacles ==
The three major skills in education that are considered the “core” subjects to teach students include math, writing, and reading comprehension. These important areas are considered by many the tools for success for student achievement. A consequence of predominately emphasizing these three areas of academic study is a lack of attention to other major areas of academics, mainly the arts. Viewing the arts as insignificant has had a major impact on teaching creativity to students.

=== No Child Left Behind ===
The importance of teaching the arts to students has recently been viewed as less essential than teaching other core studies, particularly by school administrators. Educational institutions are attempting to maintain federal standards to receive government funding. These standards focus predominantly on subjects such as English and math and are also highly emphasized during standardized testing. If schools can improve student achievement within these areas, they do not become vulnerable to a loss or reduction in federal funding. Robin Pogrebin of the New York Times states, “In a time when President Bush’s “No Child Left Behind” policy emphasizes test results, the arts do not easily lend themselves to quantifiable measurements”. Therefore, schools are placing a large emphasis on teaching students to excel in these areas of study. This includes more time allotted for the instruction of these classes as well as a large amount of the school budget to enhance these courses.

=== School budgets ===
While a sizable amount of the educational budget is spent on these important areas of academic study, schools are finding that there is less money for what some would consider as non-essential courses, such as higher level music and art. According to the academic journal The Electronic Musician, “On March 2, 2011, both the House and Senate agreed to eliminate a number of small education programs at the U.S. Department of Education, including the complete defunding of the Arts in Education program, a $40 million fund that supports competitive grants and national initiatives”. While small reductions to budgets are common during a recession, some states have reduced their arts budgets drastically. According to the Teaching Artists Journal, “In 2004, total state funding for the arts will drop to $272 million, a 23% decrease in just the last year. And nearly two-thirds of that total decrease comes from cutbacks in just three of the hardest hit states: California, Michigan and Florida”. While the reduction of funding for the arts has been reduced nearly a quarter in different areas, educators often struggle to maintain their arts program as a vital skill to teach to students. The funds that have been reduced now disallow the arts to provide furnishings and supplies as well as instructor salaries that are essential to these programs. As a result, art courses are not regarded with the same amount of respect and students are denied a creative outlet within their education.

Budget issues and the reduction of spending for the arts has caused numerous schools to attempt to find additional sources to help support their arts program. School administrators frequently look towards state funding to assist in financing the arts. Grants and other means to finance the arts are increasingly becoming more frequent, but they are temporary solutions to fund these programs. Schools often work with local and state governments to receive income; however numerous state governments are experiencing other budget deficit issues and can rarely afford to finance such a program in the amount that is needed. So to help support the arts, often there is need for assistance from private contributors. Still, as with grants, private contributors cannot donate enough funds to adequately support the arts in education and cannot contribute as consistently as the government could. Funding the arts in education still remains a large and unresolved issue for many school districts nationwide.

=== Practical uses ===
Advocacy for the arts raises an issue of how essential teaching the arts to students actually is. Due to statistical analysis of a perceived lapse in mathematical and reading skills of our youth, many parents feel that importance of the arts is less crucial than other fundamental areas of academic study. This is namely due, in part, by the fact that art is viewed as less needed in the workforce. However many advocates argue that students in the arts excel in interpreting and analyzing visual and spatial information. According to the National Assessment of Educational Progress, "Educators have acknowledged that the arts are basic to the acquisition of a well-rounded education. The arts provide meaning to learning. They serve as a vehicle for acquiring the skills to which educational reformers have said students should aspire: problem-solving, higher order thinking, flexibility, persistence, and cooperation." These skills that are acquired by the arts are actually needed characteristics in the modern workforce. The stress of the importance for the arts then becomes one that benefits the students for their future careers. While many view the arts as inapplicable in today’s modern workforce, many would argue that the arts provide positive results for students competing in today’s competitive job market.

=== Arts integrated teachers ===
An issue commonly brought is that “not all teachers are artists,” meaning that there aren’t enough teachers capable of doing art to teach in every classroom. However, this is not the case, as any teacher can become an arts teacher. While art is, to its core, incredibly subjective, there is a basis for every practice. In the fine arts there are the elements and principles of design, the color wheel, etc. In music there is basic music theory. In drama, there is basic play structure, acting theory, etc. Whether or not a teacher can do these things is irrelevant; if they can be taught, that information can be passed on from the teacher to the student. The goal is not to create master artists, but rather teach basic arts skills, processes, and aesthetic quality, and encourage creative teaching techniques. This basic understanding can then be passed on to the students, who then learn by doing. These skills are simple and easy to learn and teach, and will be infinitely useful in creating lesson plans and in practice. Once an arts-integrated environment is established, techniques, examples, and information can be shared amongst colleagues. They can discuss findings and share what works and does not work within the classroom.

Funding and advocacy for the arts still remains the largest issue that is currently facing teaching this important area to students. Many districts and supporters speak out for more funding to ensure advancement in the arts, however there is little money to be shared across the many programs in education. Many fear that certain arts programs may be removed from some schools due to these concerns. While art education is considered one of the core subjects in the No Child Left Behind Act, there are many who fear for its future.

== The contribution of arts education to children’s development ==
The arts are often perceived as a hobby, an interest or purely as a recreational occupation. In a society where the entire educational system is based on preparing a future work force, focus is put on the STEM field (Science, Technology, Engineering and Math) and the arts are neglected. In a time of economic instability resources are strictly distributed and the arts are ever so often first to get cut. Yet, research on the effects of arts education on children’s learning and development show significant positive outcomes on children exposed to arts programs with teacher supervision compared to children not exposed to arts education. Research shows that children exposed to arts do better in school, develop greater social, cognitive and emotional skills and are more likely to earn higher degrees of education later in life.

=== Academic effects ===
Participation in arts programs is positively correlated with increased academic achievement, including higher math and verbal SAT scores, when compared to the performance of students without arts education.

Research by the National Educational Longitudinal Survey (NELS;88), a panel study which has followed more than 25,000 students in American secondary schools for 10 years, show significant results on the positive outcomes from children exposed to high arts in school with a teacher supervising. The study examines the time from 8th grade through 10th and 12th grade and throughout high school. Furthermore, this study, conducted by James Catterall and colleagues, which started in the mid-90s followed up on the same students at age 26 in 2009.

An exploratory study published by the National Art Education Association looked at the integration of arts in classroom curriculum and concluded that this integration enhanced academic learning because of the fully immersive engagement of the arts, which allows students to understand different perspectives, safely take risks, express feelings through less restrictive modes, and draw parallels between the arts and traditional core subject areas.

==== Excerpt from Renaissance in the Classroom: Arts Integration and Meaningful Learning ====
One familiar movement in schools today is the alignment of curriculum with multiple intelligences. Howard Gardner's (1983) theory of multiple intelligences (MI), outlined in his book, Frames of Mind, has contributed to the increasing awareness of the value of the arts in children's learning and in schools today. Educators such as Thomas Armstrong (1994) and David Lazear (1991), have helped translate Gardner's theory, which is essentially a psychological framework, to the world of classroom teachers. Gardner suggested that there are at least seven intelligences that most people bring to learning. Of the seven, two (linguistic and logical/mathematical) seem to predominate in most classrooms, although many children have dominant intelligences in other domains. The theory, with respect to schooling, is that if we expanded the repertoire of teaching practices to include more attention to students' capacities to use their musical, spatial, intrapersonal, interpersonal, and bodily/kinesthetic intelligences, we may reach more children. Building on students' strengths through their more dominant intelligences equips them to learn more fully.”

=== Socio-emotional development ===
A significant consensus among research on arts education exists and this is that arts reach students who are not otherwise being reached and that the arts reach students in ways that they are otherwise not being reached. Students failing is commonly explained by disengaged students and finding that arts provide students a reason and a motivation for being engaged with school and thus preventing students from dropping out of school. This motivation found within can be examined through the way that engagement in arts enhances self-awareness, self-confidence, trust and empowerment. Creating art is a personal experience and involves the student’s personal resources implicating a greater involvement and investment in a work without right or wrong answers. Personal investment nourishes self-directed learning and encourages the learning experience itself rather than learning as a means of test score performance. The confidence, collaboration, and creativity that arts education fosters has a circular, positive effect on academics as well as cultural engagement.

=== Socio-cultural development ===
These changes were measured by the American Indian Belief Inventory was measured on four groups exposed to Native American culture and a fifth group with no cultural exposure. All of the four groups showed improvement while the fifth control group did not.[32]

Longitudinal studies have shown that students with arts education are more civically engaged. This socio-cultural effect of arts integration is disproportionately stronger for at-risk students.

=== Cognitive development ===
Research on the contribution of the arts to the cognitive field show a great array of cognitive developments in spatial-temporal abilities, verbal skills, memory and spatial reasoning. A study by Chan et al. using sixty female college students in the U.S showed a relationship of the students’ music training before age 12 and their verbal memory. The students with music training showed a significantly better recall than those without formal training. A meta-analysis by the American Psychological Association furthermore showed how listening to music can result in progressive relaxation and that listening to classical music one hour a day increases greater brain coherence and more time spent in the alpha state (state of aware relaxation stimulating imagination, intuition and higher awareness). Studies on premature babies have also found that while receiving special care and being exposed to classical music they physically and mentally developed significantly faster than those babies who weren’t exposed to classical music. Further studies have also indicated that incorporating Art into academic education for disabled children better supported cognitive development and improved communication skills.

== Integration of arts in classroom curriculum ==
Jessica Davis presents eight different frameworks for considering the role of the arts in education. Her categories and methods are as follows:

1. Arts-Based - Art is at the core of learning, providing a lens through which students can understand other subjects. Art serves as the basic threshold for general learning.
2. Arts-Injected (or Infused) - Art is "injected" from the outside as a matter of enrichment (e.g., a period of music, visiting artists, etc.)
3. Arts-Included - Art is offered alongside traditional curriculum, not necessarily for interdisciplinary purposes but rather as its own course of study.
4. Arts-Expansion - Art is an exploratory adventure that takes students outside of school (e.g., field trips to a museum, concert hall, etc.)
5. Arts-Professional - This approach treats art training as a means for a professional career in the arts, and turning students into artists is the primary goal.
6. Arts-Extras - Art is sometimes offered as an additional commitment outside of regular school curriculum (e.g., school newspaper, after-school dance clubs, etc.).
7. Arts-Education - Referred to by some as aesthetic education, this approach uses art as a way of knowing, turning its study more philosophical to interpret and apply to experiences.
8. Arts-Cultura - Art connects individual students' "culture" to collective community "cultures" to more structured racial/national "Cultures" to the ultimate universal "Culture." It is through this interplay that art encourages students to take risks, think critically, and make meaning.

It is often difficult to fully integrate the arts with traditional classroom instruction in a way that allows for the arts-cultura model. This is largely due to the disconnect between art teachers and teachers of other subjects, who are not given the time or ability to coordinate and interweave lesson plans that apply art to core subjects and vice versa.

=== Arts Technology Integration ===
As technology continually advances, arts integration evolves to match. The challenge in integrating arts in today's technology-first education lies not in implementing production labs on school campuses or accessing the latest computer software, but rather in effectively managing the sheer amount of information that technology makes available. Students must learn to select relevant data, assess these data, and draw critically from them to make meaning, answer questions, or form new ones. Technology also presents more channels of expression, whether through digital art or artificial intelligence, which, if supported by arts-technology integration, can cultivate that and inquiry that arts education champions.

=== UNESCO Arts Integration Program ===
The United Nations Educational, Scientific, and Cultural Organization (UNESCO), a special agency of the UN that operates from Paris, France, advocates the need for the integration of arts, culture, and creativity in all educational platforms worldwide. This agenda is in line with the structure of “Quality Education” and “Education for All” to support methodologies for promoting and protecting diversity of cultural manifestation. For example, UNESCO Bangkok took the initiative of upholding research activities related to Arts Education and swap of information along with case studies among educators, artists, and other stakeholders within Asia and the Pacific. The very first international congress on arts education was held in Seoul (Korea) in 2006 and the second in 2010.

== Conclusion ==
Due to current economic recession many schools across see their arts programs cut off in favor of core curriculum subject such as English, math and science. Despite the lack of apparent and secure job possibilities within the arts and a pressuring need for a strong work force within the STEM fields (Science, Technology, Engineering and Math) research show that arts education is crucial in children’s learning process and development. In 2013 a congressional resolution sought to include "A" for Art in the STEM acronym, changing it to STEAM. Studies show that children exposed to arts education throughout childhood through primary, secondary and tertiary school show greater scores on academic achievements as well as greater social, cultural, emotional and cognitive development. Some of the measured improvement are greater self-confidence, communicative skills, cultural awareness and sensitivity alongside greater stimulated creativity and overall academic achievement.

== See also ==
- Art education
- Art education in the United States
- Art schools
- Arts in education
- Arts-based environmental education
- STEAM
- Teaching Artist
