= Architectural Thinking School for Children =

Experimental education project

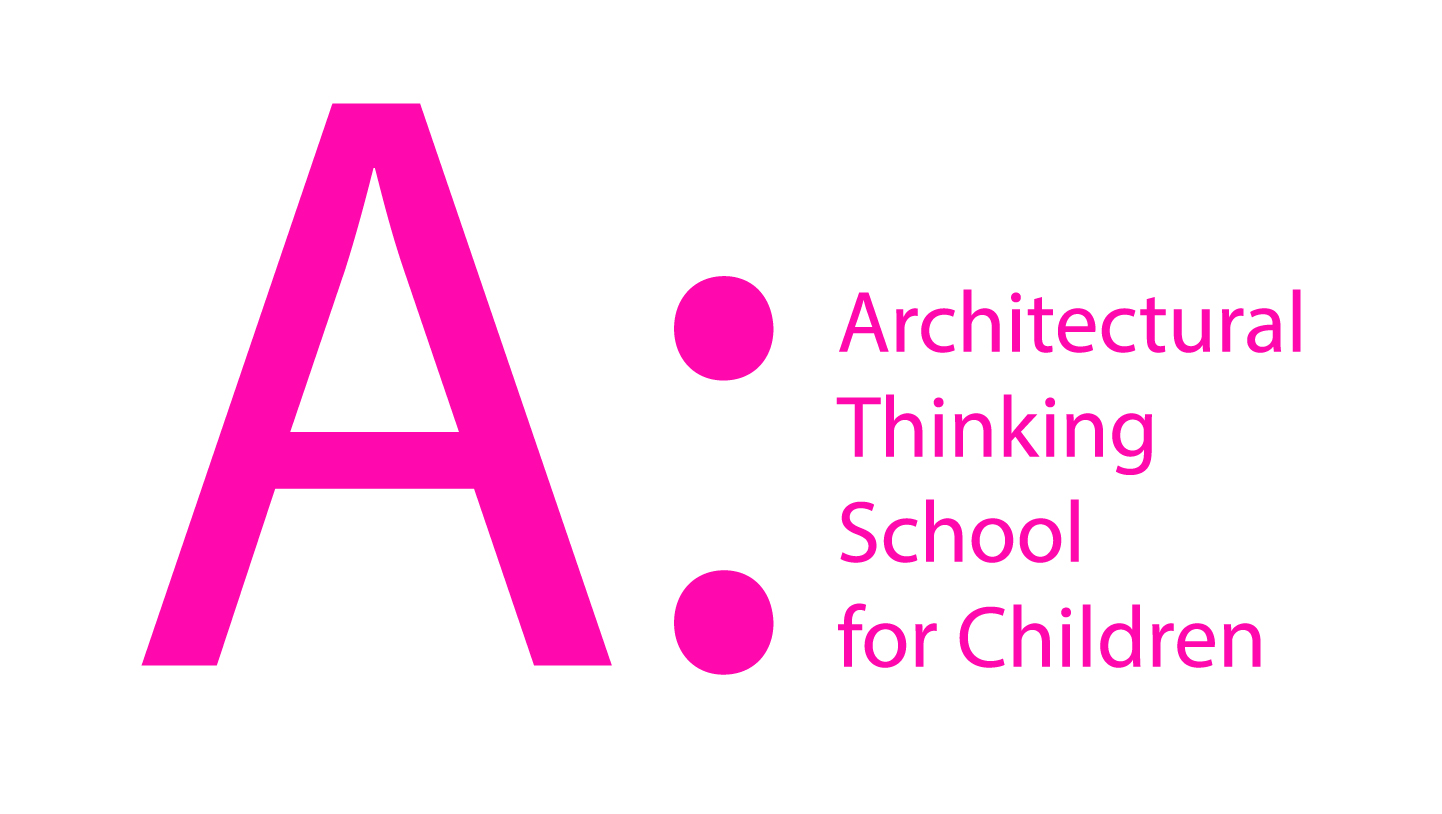
- Formation: 2016; 9 years ago
- Founders: Alexander Novikov, Elena Karpilova
- Type: Educational project
- Location: Minsk, Belarus (2016–2022) Lisbon, Portugal (2022–present)
- Methods: Project-based learning
- Field: Arts education with focus on architecture and innovative methodologies
- Website: aschool.org

Architectural Thinking School for Children is an interdisciplinary supplementary education project founded in 2016 by architect Alexander Novikov and artist Elena Karpilova in Minsk, Belarus. The school focuses on developing "architectural thinking" – an interdisciplinary approach to problem-solving – in children aged 6–14 through project-based learning. Since 2022, it operates in Lisbon, Portugal, working primarily with migrant children.

== History ==
Founded in Minsk in 2016, the school began offline operations. In 2022, following the Russian invasion of Ukraine and its regional impact, the school relocated to Lisbon. There, it established activities in Lisbon through partnerships with Portuguese cultural institutions and was registered as a non-governmental organization (NGO).

== Methodology ==
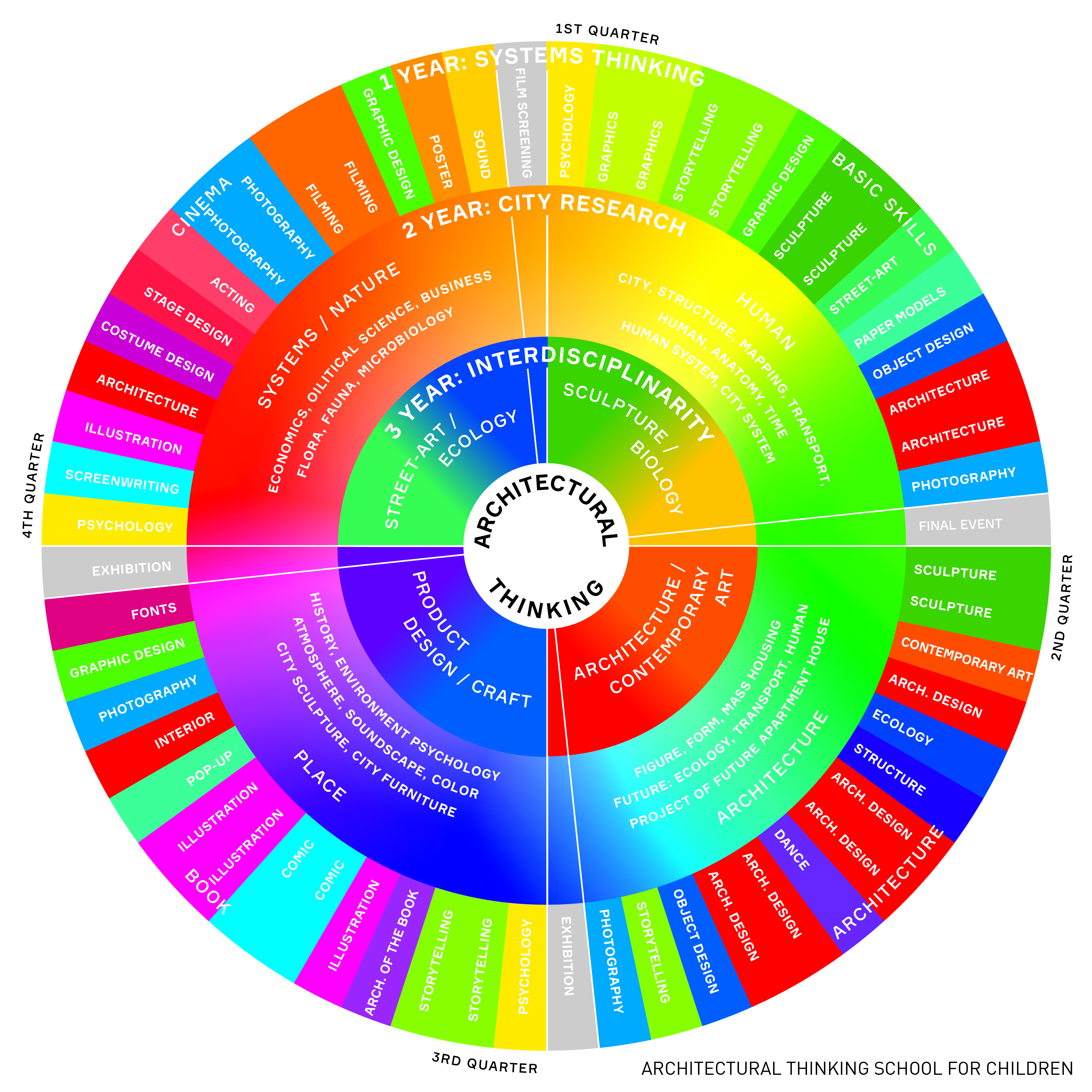
Architectural Thinking School for Children Programme

The school's program integrates architecture, urban design, ecology, film and contemporary art through project-based learning. Each term culminates in tangible projects like exhibitions or publications. Professional practitioners teach classes after pedagogical training to adapt their expertise for children. This approach has been documented in international publications including the field guide Archifutures Vol. 5: Apocalypse and featured in the Mexican architecture journal Arquine.

== Notable projects ==
- HOUSEДОМДОМ: A Book of Children's Projects and other Avant-Garde Architecture (2019): Book of children's architectural projects featured in ArchDaily, Tatlin, Afisha Daily and The New East Archive. Listed on Goodreads. and Google Books.
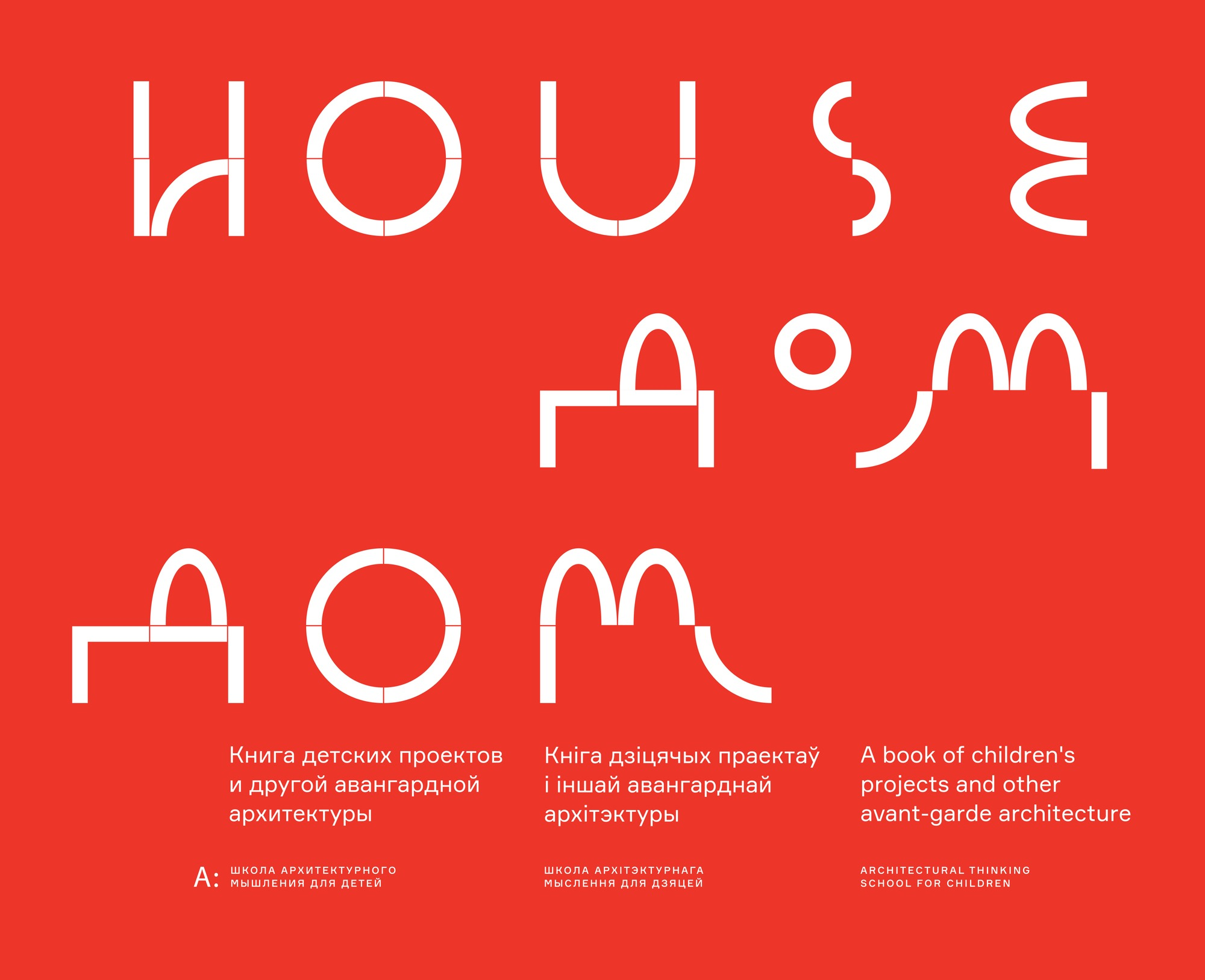
  HOUSEДОМДОМ: A Book of Children's Projects and other Avant-Garde Architecture. Altiora Forte, 2019
- Bambini Ovunque - Children Everywhere (2024): Unofficial participatory project at the Venice Art Biennale 2024, part of the Foreign Pavilion initiative. Announced in ArchDaily and covered in Die Presse.
- Children's Spaces of Protest, Civic Activism, and Play (2025): Public talk at Venice Architecture Biennale 2025 (GENS Public Programme).
- IntelliGens Play Lab (2025): Unofficial participatory project at the Venice Architecture Biennale 2025, part of the Foreign Pavilion initiative. Announced in ArchDaily.

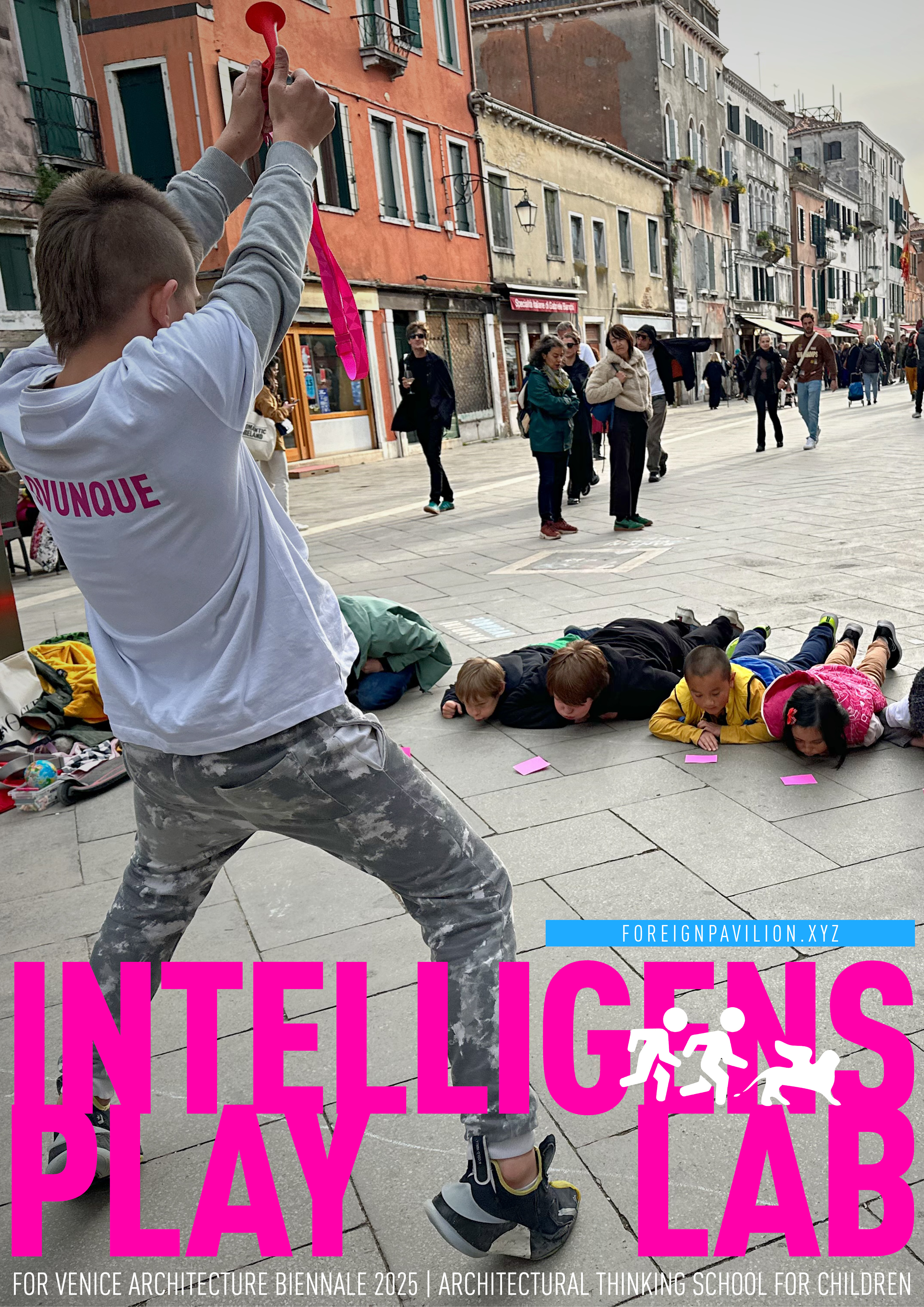
Children-led urban play interventions tackling global crises during Venice Architecture Biennale 2025

== Exhibitions ==
- House/Дом/Casa at Lisbon Architecture Triennale (2022)
- Projects at Museum of Contemporary Art MAC/CCB, Lisbon (2023-2024)

== Awards and nominations ==
Year	Category	Nominee	Result	Ref.
2021	Individuals of the Year	Elena Karpilova and Alexander Novikov	Nominated	
2021	Best Organisation	Architectural Thinking School for Children	Nominated	
2022	Diversity in Action	Architectural Thinking School for Children	Won	
2022	Best International Organisation	Architectural Thinking School for Children	Won	
2024	Best International Organisation	Architectural Thinking School / Bambini Ovunque	Nominated	

== Gallery ==
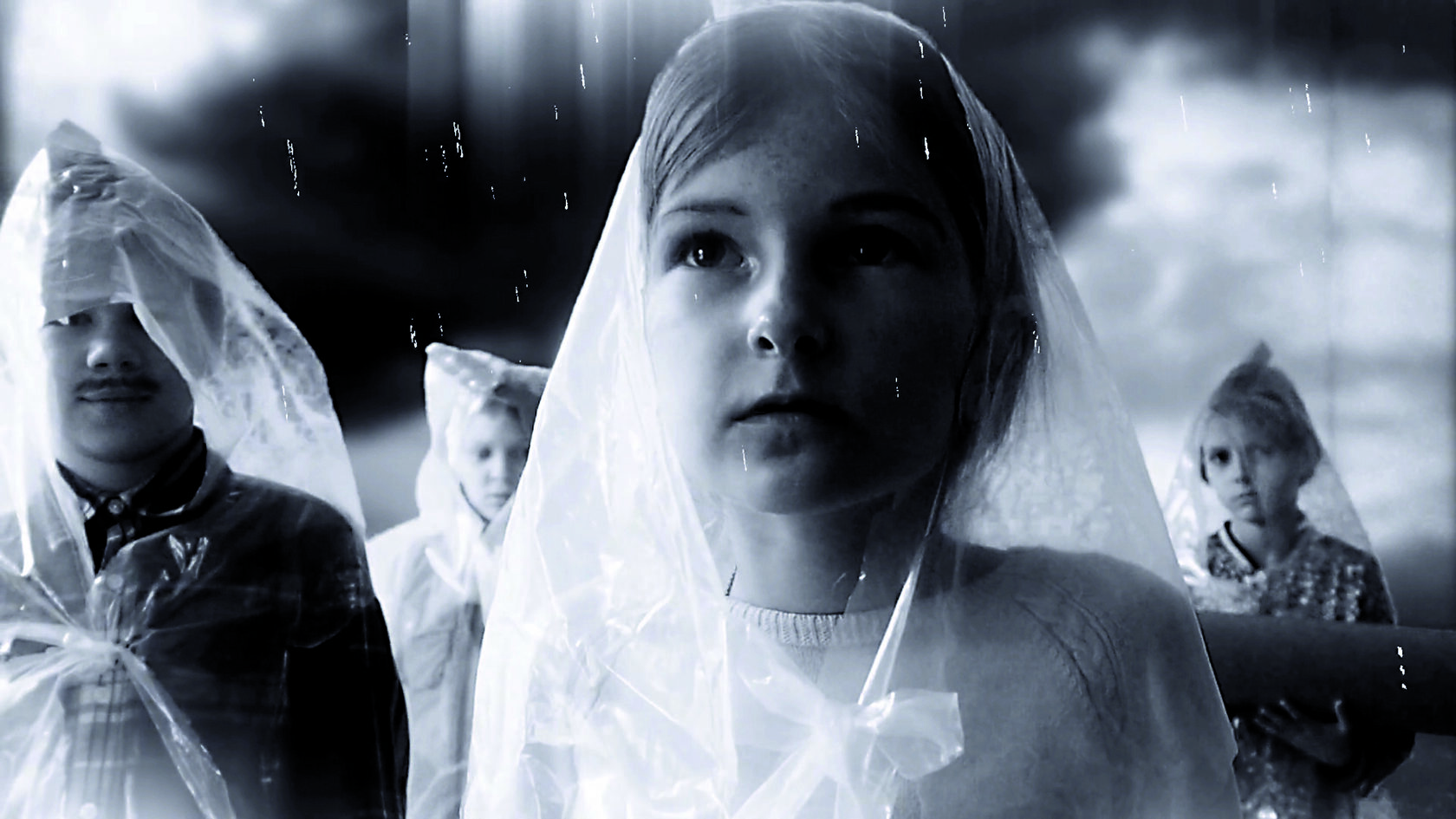
The Endless Rain War Short Film. 2019

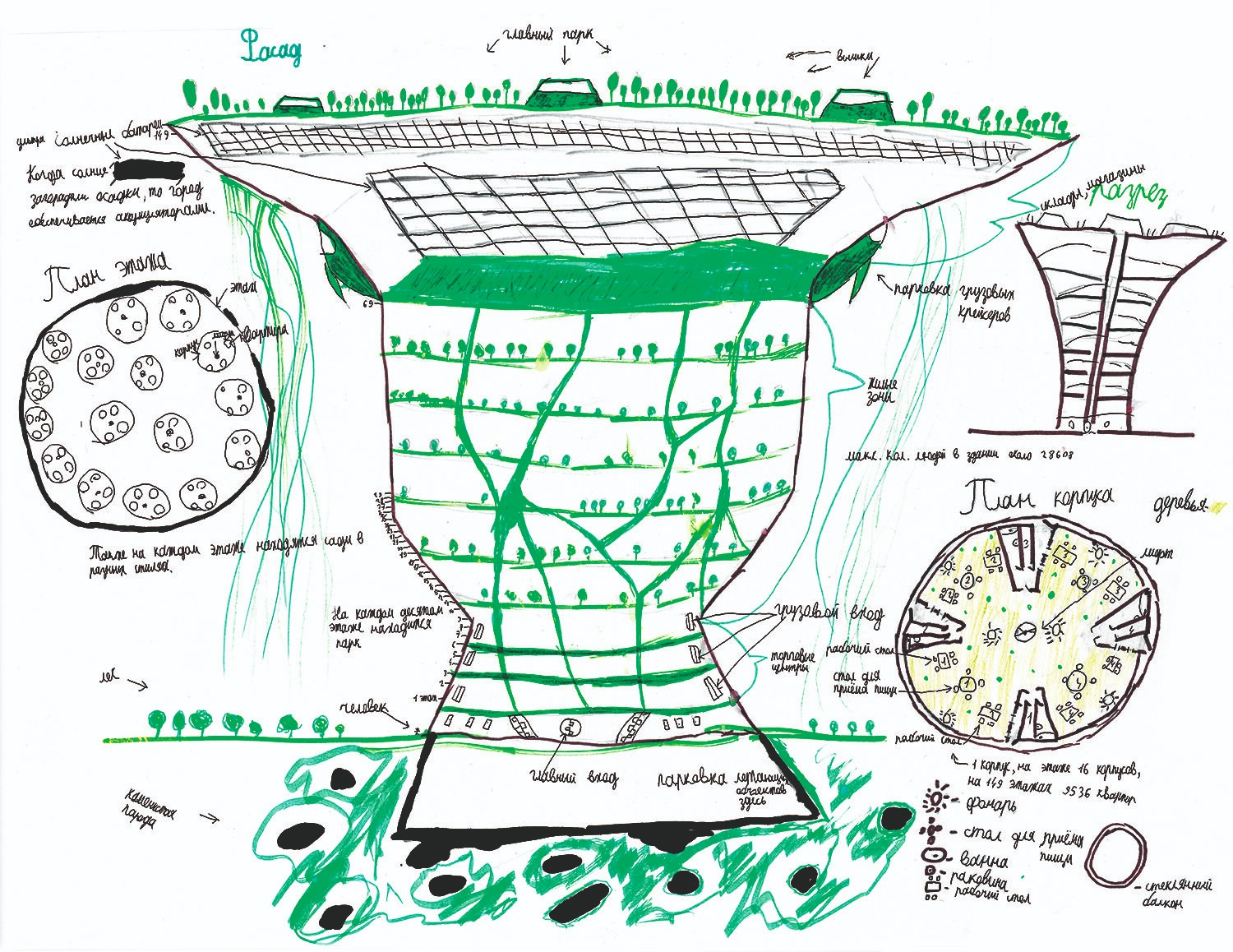
Green House — Green Town apartment house of the future (2067). 2017
