= Elliot Eisner =

American professor (1933–2014)

Elliot Wayne Eisner (March 10, 1933 – January 10, 2014) was a professor of Art and Education at the Stanford Graduate School of Education, and was one of the United States' leading academic minds. He was active in several fields including arts education, curriculum reform, qualitative research, and was the recipient of a University of Louisville Grawemeyer Award in 2005 for his work in education as well as the Brock International Prize in 2004. In 1992, he became the recipient of the José Vasconcelos World Award of Education in recognition to his 30 years of scholarly and professional work, particularly his contribution in the formulation of educational policy to better understand the potential of the arts in the educational development of the young. He was the 1997 recipient of the Sir Herbert Read Award of the International Society for Education through Art (INSEA).

== Biography ==
Eisner was born in Chicago, Illinois on March 10, 1933, to a family of Russian Jewish immigrants. His father, Louis Eisner (originally Leibl Iznuk), was born in the shtetl of Pavoloch in the Russian Empire (now Ukraine), and immigrated to America in 1909. He was an Oxen harness maker and a leatherworker, as well as a member of the International Fur & Leather Workers Union. His union experiences, and later work at Chicago's Platt Luggage Factory, instilled in him Socialist leanings. Louis Eisner's union activity provided him an opportunity to meet Eugene Debs at a Socialist convention for his campaign for the Election of 1920. His mother, Eva Perzov (originally Chava Perzovsky), was a stenographer from the town of Chechersk (in present-day Belarus).

Elliot Eisner received his M.A (1958) and Ph.D. (1962) in education from the University of Chicago, where he studied with Joseph Schwab, Bruno Bettelheim, Benjamin Bloom and Phillip Jackson. He was appointed Associate Professor of Education and Art at Stanford University in 1965.

His work has supported Discipline-Based Art Education, and he developed the importance of forms of representation in education. Eisner started making his case for the arts in scholarly publications during the 1960s. He recognized that the lack of the arts and the prominence of standards and standardized tests had resulted in a lack of appreciation for creative thinking in the classroom. Rote memory, and the single way to a final answer, ruled. Eisner’s vision of the public school was one where standards might exist, but instead of dominating the curriculum they worked side by side with artistic approaches to developing curriculum and assessing students’ performance. In an article titled “Curriculum Ideas in a Time of Crisis,” Eisner (1965) makes a call to action concerning the arts: "Perhaps we can now identify the crisis in art education. I believe it is a crisis of making the most of a period of opportunity. I believe this to be a period of unlimited promise for the field of art education. Our crisis is now, the students are ready, the parents are ready, the country is ready-will we be ready?." Art education at this time in history, he argued, was in crisis not only because of a lack of art in schools, but because the way the arts were taught was focused primarily on expansiveness of student’s work with media rather than understanding a given media in depth. Eisner not only proceeded to make a call for a greater presence of the arts in schools, he also made the case for developing a deeper understanding of art. He wrote, “I would like to propose that the art education curriculum be built along three major lines of focus. These three foci are the productive aspects of art, the critical aspects, and the historical aspects”. The productive aspects of art are where the students engage in actually producing works of art, while the critical aspects focus on students’ having the language to critique and talk about a work of art and its effect on them as a viewer, and the historical aspects cover the movements of art over a course of time. This call to action was a call driven by a direct lack of subject matter that was important to Eisner, personally. He was making a case for something that he was passionate about because he saw that the attention given to it at the time was damaging any real experience that students could have with the curriculum content. This would mark the direction of his work for a long time to come.

While Eisner’s (1965) initial focus was primarily on bringing attention to the arts and the lack of it in the American curriculum, he also wanted to point out that art did not need to be siloed from other subjects or that it had a monopoly over creativity. He wrote, “Now, developing creativity is a fine thing and I believe art educators should attend to it, but let us not delude ourselves, art education has no franchise upon creativity”. This is an important factor in Eisner’s thinking because while he endeavored to bring Art Education to the front lines of the discussion he also made the argument that responsibility for the education of art and creativity belongs to all. There is an art in all subject matter from math to English to science, and teachers should not leave it up to the art teachers only to engage students in creative modes of expression. Eisner (1965) furthered his argument in another piece from the same time frame. He wrote: “Once considered an elusive, almost mystical gift to a special few, creativity is now being seen as a capacity common to all - one that should be effectively developed by the school”. Eisner’s passion for art fit neatly into an absence he saw in school curricula, and as a matter of progression in his work, he saw an opportunity to address the art of curriculum development and teacher’s pedagogy, as well.

During the 1980s, he had a number of exchanges with Denis C. Phillips regarding the status of qualitative research for educational understanding. Eisner also had a well-known debate with Howard Gardner as to whether a work of fiction such as a novel could be submitted as a dissertation (Eisner believed it could, and some novels have since been successfully submitted).

He published regularly; his works included hundreds of articles and over a dozen books. He also frequently spoke before teachers, administrators, and at professional conferences. He served as president of many professional organizations, including the American Educational Research Association, the National Art Education Association, the International Society for Education through Art (InSEA) and the John Dewey Society.

Elliot Eisner died on January 10, 2014, from complications of Parkinson's disease.
