= Teaching artist =

Professional artist who also teaches art

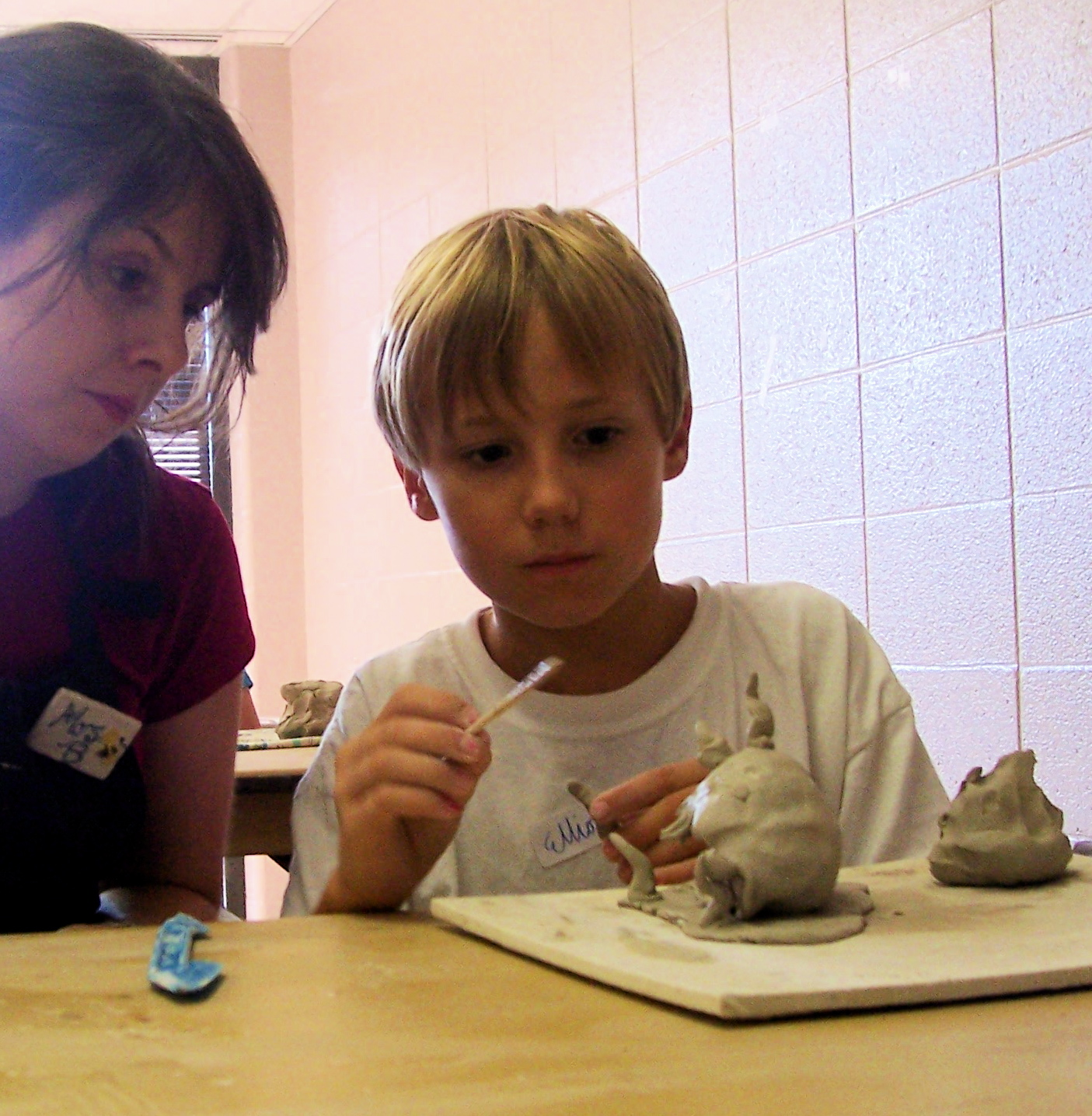
A Memphis potter conducts a summer workshop in hand-building in Germantown, Tennessee.

Teaching artists (TAs), also known as artist educators, are professional artists who both make art and teach others art.

== Overview ==
Teaching artists work in educational and community settings, such as in schools, after school programs, libraries, retirement homes, prisons, healthcare facilities, social service agencies, governments and corporations. The Arts In Education movement benefited from the work of teaching artists in schools.

Arts learning consultant Eric Booth has defined a teaching artist as "a practicing professional artist with the complementary skills, curiosities, and sensibilities of an educator, who can effectively engage a wide range of people in learning experiences in, through, and about the arts." This term applies to professional artists in all artistic fields. Arts integration is a teaching methodology facilitated by teaching artists where students construct and demonstrate understanding through an art form.

Teaching artists have worked in schools and in communities for many decades.

During the COVID-19 pandemic in the United States, TAs were among the first staff to be fired, furloughed, or have contracts terminated, with little recourse, as they typically work without labor union backing. Historically, TAs work in part-time or independent-contractor roles with compensation based on hourly rates or service duration, which undervalues their commitment to creating high-quality programming. Moreover, TAs lack traditional benefits, including healthcare, pensions, sick leave, and job security. In April 2020, a team comprising 16 U.S. national arts leaders and five arts organizations convened to address the critical moment TAs faced. That summer, they published a white paper calling on the arts and culture sector, the philanthropic community, policymakers, schools, libraries, retirement homes, detention centers and community entities to prioritize and value TAs.

== See also ==
- Artist
- Teacher
- Visual arts education
