= James Elkins (art historian) =

American art historian and art critic

James Elkins (born 1955) is an American art historian and art critic. He is E.C. Chadbourne Chair of art history, theory, and criticism at the School of the Art Institute of Chicago. He also coordinates the Stone Summer Theory Institute, a short term school on contemporary art history based at the School of the Art Institute of Chicago.

== Education ==
- BA, cum laude, 1977, Cornell University
- MFA and MA, 1984, University of Chicago
- PhD with honors, 1989, University of Chicago

== Publications ==
=== Non-fiction ===
- The Poetics of Perspective (Cornell University Press, 1994)
- The Object Stares Back: On the Nature of Seeing (Simon and Schuster, 1996)
- Our Beautiful, Dry, and Distant Texts: Art History as Writing (Penn State Press, 1997)
- On Pictures and the Words That Fail Them (Cambridge University Press, 1998)
- What Painting Is (Routledge, 1998)
- Why Are Our Pictures Puzzles? On the Modern Origins of Pictorial Complexity (Routledge, 1999)
- The Domain of Images (Cornell University Press, 1999)
- Chinese Landscape Painting as Western Art History (Hong Kong University Press, 2010). Originally published in Chinese in 1999.
- Pictures of the Body: Pain and Metamorphosis (Stanford University Press, 1999)
- How to Use Your Eyes (Routledge, 2000)
- Pictures and Tears: A History of People Who Have Cried in Front of Paintings (Routledge, 2001)
- Why Art Cannot Be Taught: A Handbook for Art Students (University of Illinois Press, 2001)
- Stories of Art (Routledge, 2002)
- Visual Studies: A Skeptical Introduction (Routledge, 2003)
- What Happened to Art Criticism? (Prickly Paradigm Press, 2003)
- On the Strange Place of Religion in Contemporary Art (Routledge, 2004)
- Master Narratives and Their Discontents (Routledge, 2005)
- Six Stories from the End of Representation (Stanford University Press, 2008)
- Art Critiques: A Guide (New Academia, 2011; 2nd ed., 2012; 3rd ed., 2014)
- What Photography Is (Routledge, 2012)
- The End of Diversity in Art Historical Writing: North Atlantic Art History and Its Alternatives (De Gruyter, 2020)
- Ideas and Materials for Five Strange Languages (2026)

==== As editor ====
- Artists with PhDs: On the New Doctoral Degree in Studio Art (New Academia, 2009; 2nd ed., 2014)

=== Five Strange Languages ===
- Book 1: Stories, Like Illnesses (The Unnamed Press, 2026)
- Book 2: A Short Introduction to Anneliese (The Unnamed Press, 2025)
- Book 3: Weak in Comparison to Dreams (The Unnamed Press, 2023)
- Book 4: Ghosts Are (forthcoming)
- Book 5: An Inventory of the Dead (forthcoming)
