= Room 13 International =

Room 13 International is a network of arts studios in primary schools worldwide. Each studio is run by the students as a self-sufficient business. The network is named after the first such studio, which operated in Room 13 in the Caol Primary School in Fort William, Scotland.

As of 2012, the network consists of over 80 studios around the globe.

== History ==
The first studio in Room 13 of the Caol Primary School in Fort William, Scotland was started by Rob Fairley, an Artist-in-residence, and his students, in 1994.

In 2003, Room 13 won a £200,000 award from NESTA to expand the project into other schools. By 2005, Room 13 Caol had become the global headquarters for a network of 10 Room 13 studios in the United Kingdom, Nepal, South Africa and Dunedin, New Zealand.
