= Eric Booth =

American author, actor, and educator

Eric Booth (born October 8, 1950, in New York City) is an American author, actor, and arts educator who writes and speaks about teaching artistry. He was the founding editor of the Teaching Artist Journal.

== Early career ==
Booth began his professional career as an actor. He performed on Broadway in productions, including A Walk in the Woods, Whose Life Is It Anyway?, Golda, and Caesar and Cleopatra. He also performed with the Oregon Shakespeare Festival and the New Jersey Shakespeare Festival.

In 1978, he received the New Jersey Drama Critics Award for Best Actor for his performance as the title character in Hamlet.

In 1984, Eric Booth founded Alert Publishing, which focused on analyzing and publishing research on American lifestyle trends, later selling the organization in the 1990s.

== Teaching artistry and arts education ==
In the late 1970s, Booth began working with Lincoln Center Institute (later Lincoln Center Education), where he taught and helped shape the creation of the Institute's teaching artist initiatives. He also helped found the Leonard Bernstein Center's Teacher Center.

Booth later joined The Juilliard School, where he served as the first head of the school's mentoring program, part of the June Noble Larkin Program for the Humanities. He has continued to teach arts education and mentorship at Juilliard.

== International work ==
Booth has spoken internationally at arts education conferences, such as the UNESCO World Conference on Arts Education in Lisbon (2006).

In 2012, he co-founded the International Teaching Artist Conference (ITAC), an international network that connects teaching artists working across education and communities. The organization's inaugural conference was held in Oslo, Norway.

== Music education for social change ==
Booth has served as an advisor to programs focused on ensemble-based music education and youth development. In 2016, he and Tricia Tunstall co-authored Playing for Their Lives: The Global El Sistema Movement for Social Change Through Music, published by W. W. Norton & Company, which charted the global spread of El Sistema, the music education movement that originated in Caracas, Venezuela. Visiting over 100 programs across 25 countries, the book incorporates interviews with program directors, educators, students, and family members.

In a 2018 review published in "Notes", Jessica Grimer discussed Booth's book "Playing for Their Lives" in the context of music education and social change.

=== Awards and honors ===
- Arts Education Leadership Award, Americans for the Arts (2015)
- National Service Award, National Guild for Community Arts Education (2019)
- Honorary Doctor of Music, New England Conservatory (2012)
- Honorary Doctorate, Royal Conservatoire of Scotland (2024)

== Personal life ==
Booth was born Eric Booth Miller.

== Selected books ==
- Booth, Eric (2023). Making Change: Teaching Artists and Their Role in Shaping a Better World. Betteryet Press. ISBN 978-0-578-48279-8.
- Booth, Eric (2019). Tending the Perennials: The Art and Spirit of a Personal Religion. SelectBooks. ISBN 978-0-578-48278-1.
- Booth, Eric; Tunstall, Tricia (2016). Playing for Their Lives: The Global El Sistema Movement for Social Change Through Music. W. W. Norton & Company. ISBN 978-0-393-24734-3.
- Booth, Eric (2007). The Music Teaching Artist's Bible: Becoming a Virtuoso Educator. Oxford University Press. ISBN 978-0-19-530892-1.
- Booth, Eric (1997). The Everyday Work of Art: Awakening the Extraordinary in Your Daily Life. Bantam. ISBN 978-0-553-37839-9.
