= Arts-based environmental education =

Arts-based environmental education (AEE) brings art education and environmental education together in one undertaking. The approach has two essential characteristics. The first is that it refers to a specific kind of environmental education that starts off from an artistic approach. Different from other types of outdoor or environmental education which offer room for aesthetic experiences, AEE turns the tables in a fundamental way. Art is not an added quality, the icing on the cake; it is rather the point of departure in the effort to find ways in which people can connect to their environment. A second fundamental characteristic is that AEE is one of the first contemporary approaches of bringing together artistic practice and environmental education in which practitioners also made an attempt to formulate an epistemology.

== The roots of arts-based environmental education as it was developed in Finland ==
The term "arts-based environmental education" (AEE) was first coined by Finnish art educator Meri-Helga Mantere in the 1990s. Mantere describes AEE as a form of learning that aims to develop environmental understanding and responsibility “by becoming more receptive to sense perceptions and observations and by using artistic methods to express personal environmental experiences and thoughts”. Artistic experiences improve one's ability to see; they help one in knowing and understanding. Therefore, she maintains that these can be of high value in learning about the environment. Mantere's description of her method of art-based environmental education can be taken as a first attempt at a definition:

"What do I do as an environmentalist and as an art teacher? To put it rather simply: I try to support fresh perception, the nearby, personal enjoyment and pleasure of perceiving the world from the heart. To achieve that, it is necessary to stop, be quiet, have time and feel psychologically secure in order to perceive the unknown, the sometimes wild and unexpected. At times conscious training of the senses, decoding the stereotype, is needed. I aim at an openness to sensitivity, new and personal ways to articulate and share one’s environmental experiences which might be beautiful, disgusting, peaceful or threatening. I support and facilitate the conversation with the environment."

In short, Mantere's conception of AEE is grounded on the belief that sensitivity to the environment can be developed by artistic activities. As an artist, and as a teacher and therapist, she came to find it more and more important to go back to the basics of the process and skill of perception. Here, the question of how we perceive and how we receive or reject the messages of the environment is central. Important to underline - because it counters possible allegations of embracing a too Romantic view of nature – is that there is also room for the “shadow” side of experience, for feelings of disgust, fear and agony.

=== Early years of development ===
The historical antecedents of arts-based environmental education as it was developed in Finland go back to 1971, the year that the first European regional InSEA congress was held in that country. Finnish art educators had pooled their efforts to arrange this meeting with the overarching theme “Environmental Protection in Art Education.” Pirkko Pohjakallio is a specialist on multidisciplinary approaches to environmental education in the context of Finnish art education since the 1970s. Quoting Kauppinen (1972), she provides the rationale for the congress at the time: “One reason for making the theme was the wish to emphasize the manifoldness and diversity of our environmental problems – [they] are not purely biological, economic and social ones but also aesthetic ones, and are consequently part of art education, not only as separate subjects of study but also as integrated parts of other subjects dealing with our living environment” (Kauppinen, cited in Pohjakallio, 2007).

Already at that time, as Meri-Helga Mantere, notes, attention was paid to aesthetic and critical observation of the environment, both in the education of art teachers and in the curricula of Finnish schools. In the first decade, the focus of the kind of environmental education, practiced in Finland as part of art education, was on the man-made environment. Subjects were environmental pollution and the exploitation of nature. Problems of the environment were visually approached in teaching by identifying, classifying and listing the types and degrees of damages. As Mantere summarizes, “the emphasis was not so much on the environment as it was on politics”.).

Similarly, also Pirkko Pohjakallio notes that in the early 1970s, the prevailing interest in art teacher education and in visual arts first was in cultural studies and in linguistic and conceptual directions. The emphasis was on interpretations of expressions of visual communication and on investigating if these revealed ideology and relations of power. It was a progressive move away from integrating art with crafts in the curriculum. Environmental education, at the time, concentrated on problems, and this was reflected in the images that were created in art classes, representing “dying nature, spoilt built environments, factories that polluted, and chaotic traffic jams”. In these times of social activism, practicing and becoming art teachers read the ecological and political pamphlets of the time. However, when they tried to address the themes and questions during art lessons, these proved so wide and difficult, that neither pupils nor teacher could envisage any solutions, leading to feelings of despair rather than empowerment. Ultimately this led to a dead end: “the use of conscious, threatening environmental scenarios and political topicalities as intellectual fuel proved to be a questionable idea”.

=== Change in the 1980s ===
The 1980s saw a change in Finland. From first being a subject that was limited to environmentally conscious groups and individuals interested in nature conservation, the earth's ecological state started to capture the interest of the general public. Art teaching gravitated to assisting learners in acquiring skills in reading and evaluating the language of the man-made environment. Parallel to that, in teacher education, issues stemming from environmental psychology and environmental aesthetics were discussed. Towards the end of the decade, new trends emerged. Art educators began to develop activities that were strongly influenced by down-to-earth phenomena in environmental art and the new ecological awareness. A key figure in this development of a new approach to environmental education in the 1980s, as Pirkko Pohjakallio notes, was Meri-Helga Mantere. To the latter, an artistically oriented environmental education would be at its best when the artistic and creative perspective would run through the teaching project, from the stage of its planning to the evaluation of its results. Effectively, what this implied was that in the entire environmental education process the emphasis would be on the manner of observing, experiencing and thinking that is customary to art. To grasp a better concept of environmental education, some curriculum required students to contrast human and non-human natures.

Whereas before, art students, on basis of the prevailing orientation at the time of linguistic methods and critical theory, typically used collage of media images rather than personal and intimate contact with the actual environment, this now all began to change. To be sure, students were taken outdoors before by art educators as well, taking their pencils, drawing pads and brushes along. Here's the contrast, in Mantere's own words: "Now the purpose is to search for a more direct connection with the materiality as well as spirituality of nature. Sand, water, or any other environmental material became tools for reflection and expression. Also allusions to the mythical meanings of nature could be a starting point in the art exercises given to students."

When in the 1980s new expressionist painting, earth and environmental art emerged in society, these “were greeted as a breath of fresh air by art educators after the threatening images of the 1970s that had failed to empower those who had created them.”. Art students participated in courses on environmental pedagogy and camp schools were organized in “unspoilt” environments such as the Finnish archipelago and Lapland. Pohjakallio lists the following sources of inspiration for the new activities: deep ecology, gestalt therapy, experimental learning theories, and environmental aesthetics. Mantere notes that the ability and experience of Finnish art teachers to work in environmental education through artistic means began to draw the interest of environmental educators in general. What was attractive to them was this insight: “Attitudes and values do not seem to change through teaching that emphasizes scientific facts”.

By consequence, she adds, emotional, aesthetic and practical methods became more and more appreciated. What came into focus was the pupil's own relationship with nature and the environment, which implied a holistic and hermeneutic approach to environmental issues. Pohjakallio adds that in the newly emerging arts-based environmental education, the life-world approach came to stand central. Through that emphasis on the idea that the environment is, first of all, inhabited by persons and not something remote or detached, aspects were taken up that had been mostly neglected in art education's earlier bearings in formalist and semiotic approaches. Characteristically, the inhabitant's relationship with the environment was participatory rather than solely informed by focused attention. It involved a two-way influence and identification:

"In this approach, the environment is as much a drama and narrative as a set of critical insights and political views. In life-world, environmental aesthetics, all the senses contribute to understanding, so that the environment is as much felt as understood. It is partly a tacit affair – but not, as a consequence, beyond theorizing."

We thus see that the 1980s were in many respects a turning point. It saw the genesis of, what Mantere termed, the new environmental education (through art). A movement had emerged in art education, in which, according to Mantere, the freedom and courage to have confidence in “art as art” was central. Concomitantly, the word “process” became nothing less than essential, and the artistic process came to be seen not only as a psychically integrative, individual experience but also as a (if not the most) legitimate basis for the teaching of art. The ideas of Jung and art therapy in general influenced and inspired many Finnish art teachers. As Mantere puts it, “one could hardly talk about the soul in public, [but] one could at least talk about some kind of spirituality”. Typical of the time was that many teachers began to discuss their own situation as artists.

An important parallel development was the emergence in Finland of special art schools for children. In contrast to the compulsory comprehensive schools, these provided a new opportunity to develop artistically demanding and at cases long-term projects.

=== The importance of the 1992 Rio Earth Summit and the rise of the concept of sustainability ===
In 1992, a little more than twenty years after the landmark 1971 InSEA conference in Helsinki, the Earth Summit took place in Rio de Janeiro, the big UN Conference on Environment and Development. Again, an InSEA conference was held in Finland. At this occasion, Mantere articulated the specific Finnish approach to an international readership more fully in her seminal article “Ecology, Environmental Education and Art Teaching” (which appeared in the InSEA publication Power of Images, 1992). She wrote that, in her view, ecological thinking and action should be regarded as a guiding principle of all education. Furthermore, art education could play an important role in the development of new forms of environmental education. To her, a genuine appreciation of nature and motivation to act for the good of the environment are based above all on positive and valued experiences and these are often of an aesthetic nature. Such experiences, she went on to say, can be generated by open and immediate contact with the phenomena of nature and the often new and fresh view of these phenomena that art provides. To her, to perceive “better” is the necessary starting point to creative change in personal and collective decision making and lifestyles.

Mantere presents several arguments to support her claim that art education can play an important role in the new environmental education. All of these rely, as she puts it in her article in Power of Images, on “the artistic apprehension” of life and the environment, and on the opportunities that lend themselves to artistic influence. To begin with, she emphasizes that appreciating one's experiences, emotional expressions and subjective processing of things is at the core of art education. For that reason, aesthetic practice could be an extremely valuable contribution to experiential learning in environmental education (which she held as the latter's most fruitful and functional principle). In artmaking, participants learn by doing. Everything begins with personal experience. Simultaneously, art teaching encourages participants to discover, unearth and also to lend weight to their own mental images. These two combined, mean that art education can offer a mode in which learners can engage with their experiences and observations of the environment through artistic activity. This can be done by working with mental images, tangible pictorial expressions, etc., and by bringing to bear matured levels of reflection and conceptualization. As such, artistic activity actually constitutes cognitive action and learning in its own right.

Secondly, Mantere also underscores the need to create positive visions and concepts for the future. Sustainable development is not only about conservation but also about creating the new: better environments, objects and lifestyles. It is in the design of these that art education can play a vital role. Moreover, it is of great value if pupils become active themselves on behalf of the environment, in short, that a change of attitude is brought about. Finally, Mantere calls attention in her article to the critical insight that when an ecological lifestyle is primarily seen in terms of restriction and austerity, then it is more likely that change will only be accepted as a last resort. Through art, “it is also possible to develop the mythical, metaphorical and deep-level psychological levels of man’s relationship with nature into a constructive resource, in which factual information achieves deeper meanings”. For Mantere, art is often therapeutic, but this aspect is seldom mentioned.

=== AEE and environmental art ===
In his article “From Environmental Art to Environmental Education,” Timo Jokela, professor in art education at the University of Lapland, claims that the visual arts can offer elements to environmental education that are lacking in other fields. To him, “artistic-aesthetic learning” involves observation, experience and increasing awareness. Art sharpens our schemes of observation and activity, and thus facilitates bringing the phenomena to our consciousness. Art continuously creates new ways of observing. Even more so, visual art can be understood as actually being a history of evolving and varying schemes of observation. Previous learning experiences dominate the way in which we subsequently observe and describe our environment, says Jokela. He underpins this claim by quoting Arnold Berleant, as follows: “environments are not physical places but perceptual ones that we collaborate in making, and it is perceptually that we determine their identity and extent”.

For Jokela, the “environmental world” and the “art world” share an educational task. Environmental art, for him, is first and foremost art that is defined by the place it is made; it is created, as it were, by the environment. Its historical antecedents go back to the 1960s (e.g. the practices of “earth art” and “land art”). The Finnish art educator goes on to list four types of exercises that illustrate how environmental art can be a method of environmental education. On the one hand, these exercises are faithful to the practice of environmental art and as such they are a basic part of art education. On the other hand, they are also methods for increasing one's sensitivity towards the environment. In the latter sense, they are essentially environmental education. These are the categories that Jokela provides:

• Exercises on focusing your observations and perceiving them more sensitively;

• Exercises which bring forward the processes happening in nature, and help one in perceiving them more sensitively: growth and decay, the flow of water, the turning of day and night, the changes of light, the wind, etc.;

• Exercises which aim to alter set ways of viewing the environment;

• Exercises which test the scale of the environment and human “limits.” The starting point is a large amount of material and the aim is a clear change in the environment.

A binding factor in Jokela's categories is the implicit driving force: they are exercises that work towards achieving or accomplishing a pre-established goal; they “aim at.” Mantere makes an illuminating distinction between (a) seeing art as a tool of environmental education, (b) seeing art itself as a form of environmental education and (c) seeing environmental education as a form of art. Each alternative, she says, is possible and tones the content and activity in a different way.

=== AEE: nor 'pure' environmental education, nor 'pure' arts education ===
A composite approach such as arts-based environmental education inevitably always seems to fall between two stools: it is neither environmental education proper (because it starts off from an arts- rather than science-based perspective), nor can it convincingly be classified as a subfield of art education, as it moves away from artmaking as primarily a self-referential discipline (“l’art pour l’art”). In fact, one could say that two rather separate communities of art educators and environmental educators exist, often not understanding (or more often not aware of) each other's discourse, hence bringing along the problem of incommensurability of the paradigms from which they each approach education.

In an interview that Jan van Boeckel held with Mantere in 2007, he invited her to expand further on her conceptualization of the combining of art education and environmental education, and the way she considered that participants learn about the environment through art:

"One learns by observing the connection between outer and inner. One learns by using the senses. One gets sensitive when one learns that all the senses are (or can be) involved. When they are involved or enlivened or opened, you also get more original feelings or observations. The observations that one makes of art, of nature, of other people and one’s self, the environment or whatever, can be led by knowledge, learning theories, and so on, and that is one way to observe. In such cases one already has some kind of frame or concepts. But in this case the learning comes from being open to, and learning through, one’s senses. At those moments there are no ready-made words, concepts and structures. The artistic learning, or the artistic approach, goes to the basics of senses and feelings, to the fresh contact and presence. An artistic approach includes the sensitivity of one’s body movement and senses. Via sight or touch you study the environment, but if you hurry to name it you lose the newness. You get a touch, you get a smell, you get movement, you hear your environment. And when this happens without naming and ready-made concepts and repetitions, you always get a new experience. It is possible to get fresh, nonverbal information all the time. So the senses and observations can be creative and they kind of bring up your own images, words and conceptualizations."

Here, Mantere touches upon two contrasting forces within AEE: the more passive not-knowing while being open to one's senses, and the more active learning that takes place when integrating the new information. One has to shift, as it were, from one state of mind to the other.

One way to understand an AEE activity is to see it as a facilitated effort in which participants are encouraged to open their senses and to connect to and learn from their environment. The pedagogical point of departure in this is artistic practice rather than science-based learning. This orientation, however, should not be seen as being in opposition to other approaches of learning and acquiring knowledge. Instead, artmaking is conceived of as a (as of yet highly undervalued) way of learning and understanding in itself, complementary to other modes.

As we saw, Mantere herself emphasizes in her texts the value of experiential subjective learning processes, which she contrasts with science-based experimental knowledge. At the same time, she underlines that an art educator needs to know the scientific ecological basics like cycles of water and energy and materials used; he or she needs to be aware of the ecological threats of today: “I think that to plan an AEE workshop or lesson not knowing or caring about the ecological aspects is not environmental education at all and thus not AEE as I understand it”. Moreover, in her view, art educators ought to be able to explain in what ways the arts and aesthetics may contribute to enhancing the aims of EE as a whole, in cases where they work together with science teachers.

Nevertheless, she also holds that AEE methods, in the effort to support perceiving the world from the heart, can only achieve such fresh perception through a stop. For it is at that point that learners begin to be receptive and “to perceive the unknown, the delicate, the sometimes wild and unexpected”. When, through conscious training in the senses, the predominant cultural and personal stereotypes are decoded, not only the participant's perception becomes very different, but also his or her articulation of these in words and picture. When the subjective is both supported and facilitated by the art teacher, “more and more unconventional conversations with the environment follow”.

From her background in art, Mantere has tried to meet the challenges posed by the environmental imperatives of today. She did this by using strategies and methods that are derived from experience and knowledge of art and art education and even the world of art therapy. She mentions that important sources of inspiration were some of the Finnish traditions connected with the forest and the international field of environmental art. Further, philosopher Arne Naess and psychologist James Hillman were important mentors to her. Art touches the heart and it is the speech of soul, she quotes the latter saying.

=== Summary ===
In this overview of the way in which a specific form of arts-based environmental education developed in Finland the following core traits to be distinguished. First, one has to distinguish between the first phase of AEE in the 1970s which focused on visual imagery of the ecological crisis, and its second phase, when this perspective was complemented – if not to some extent replaced – by a more sensorially-grounded approach in which personal direct experiences of both the natural and built environment became characteristic. It is to this second phase of AEE, which emerged in the 1980s, that my attention is mostly focused, the idea that a relationship with nature can be built through the senses: the art teacher puts his or her trust in experiential learning and the teaching can move out of the classroom. The pupils are encouraged to open their senses by artistic practices, which can be almost anything from drawing and building out of natural materials to making conceptual art. Through these practices it is hoped that the pupils recognize and study their own relationship with the surrounding environment. In this, the artistic result is less important. The goal for art education is to emotionally involve pupils and to develop their ability to see the traces we leave in the landscape.

Part of this is to see the environment through art, and art through the environment. People would be educated by that environmental art or sculpture and it is a good approach to do art-based environmental education. A forest, for example, can provide the materials for making art – interpreted by traditional techniques or through conceptual art. Part of the focus is to train the students’ artistic view, so that they see and express aesthetic qualities and values in both the built and natural environment.

Distinctive to the Finnish approach is an inclination to keep the process open-ended and not to work necessarily towards reaching a preconceived and –defined goal, and the other is that practitioners of the teaching of AEE tend to see the importance of (and actively engage in) the unpacking of the epistemological foundations of their work. In her foreword to the book Image of the Earth, Writing on Art-based Environmental Education, Mantere speaks of a “we,” that is a group of Finnish artists and art teachers at the university level. Though she grants that the book is not a comprehensive account of AEE, the opening lines do have an authoritative and programmatic ring to them:

"We believe that it is possible to develop environmental understanding and responsibility by becoming more receptive to sense perceptions and observations, and by using artistic methods to express personal environmental experiences and thoughts. Artistic experiences and activities improve one’s ability to see; they help one in knowing and understanding. The issues of values and lifestyle, raised by the ecological crisis, can be approached by artistic methods, reaching otherwise unattainable areas of experience."
