= Arts in education =

Learning through arts experiences

Arts in education is an expanding field of educational research and practice informed by investigations into learning through arts experiences. In this context, the arts can include Performing arts education (dance, drama, music), literature and poetry, storytelling, Visual arts education in film, craft, design, digital arts, media and photography. It is distinguished from art education by being not so much about teaching art, but focused on:

- how to improve learning through the arts
- how to transfer learning in and through the arts to other disciplines
- discovering and creating understanding of human behavior, thinking, potential, and learning especially through the close observation of works of art and various forms of involvement in arts experiences

== Projects ==
The European Union has funded the ARTinED (a new approach to education using the arts) project to integrate the arts into every primary school subject ARTinED. The Fondazione Nazionale Carlo Collodi is the project coordinator of the ARTinED project.

The European Commission has funded the ART4rom, a project based on the practice of the arts in school and non school environments. The aim of the project is to foster intercultural dialogue, mutual understanding and social inclusion for Roma and non-Roma children aged between 5 and 10.

== Weaknesses ==
The various models of education theory are predicated on pedagogy while almost entirely ignoring the fact that most art schools are directly involved in the teaching of adults. This blind spot means that the pedagological model of learning is unsuitable for institutions that are intended to focus on andragogy which is term used specifically in relation to the teaching of adult learners.

== Importance ==
"As the repression builds, art comes to be regarded as 'time off for good behaviour' or as 'therapy'" and how the ease and carefreeness of the arts are supposed to bring joy and a sense of calmness." It is used to destroy the monotony of a regular school day, put a dent in the relentlessness of arithmetic and reading. Art should be seen as means of therapy, never something made to cause unrelenting stress and difficulty. If a student becomes less tense and wired up from stress in their learning environments, then they will raise up their grades in other classes, such as maths, English, or science. To give off a relaxed vibe, putting art on the wall tends to provide a calming environment that produces a sense of peace and serenity. Arts-related activities are important for so much more than just keeping your child busy or relaxed. They've been proven to boost a child's self-image. The self esteem, confidence and pride that comes from art in education is truly incredible and each child should be able to experience that.

The benefits of arts education programs in schools can also extend beyond therapeutic practices. Involvement in the arts can lead to increased academic performance. For example, students who participate in an arts centered program show increased performance in both verbal and mathematical assessments (Vaughn and Winner, 2000). In places like the United States, arts education is not as valued. However, some national reforms like the No Child Left Behind Act (NCLB) requires that arts education, visual and performing, be considered core subjects as they have been proven by many tests to work. Through these requirements schools gain the funds to implement subjects and supplementary items, like books and calculators, that students may need to be successful. Schools can also gain funds by participating in national and regional standardized tests, these tests however, only test students on their ability to perform high in subjects such as math, literacy, and science. Art courses aid student's ability to perform high in these subjects as they challenge a student's brain. Tests like the Mozart effect, the effect that learning and listening to classical music have on the brain, gives students the ability to learn, reduce stress, and positively change sleeping patterns more easily.

Art programs within education has its importance in not only expanding the mind but keeping kids off the streets and out of the correctional system. Studies show that students with art programs are three times more likely to graduate than those who don't. Art programs give kids somewhere to express themselves if they don't have the support to do that at home, it also gets kid to think creatively and inventively, expanding a kids way of thinking in general. Kids that had access to art programs or afterschool programs had better grades, it allowed them to improve their overall skills in school. All of these things are ways that kids keep from getting "bored" in school and getting in with the wrong crowd. Keeping art programs in schools is an important way to keep our kids safe and smart.

Professor P Vijayakumar, chairperson, Centre for Social and Organisational Leadership (C SOL) at Tata Institute of Social Sciences (TISS), Mumbai, India uses art as a teaching tool extensively in the Organisation Development and Change course for masters students states "Art facilitates reflection. Reflective practice needs to be an integral part of any management education".

== See also ==
- Applied arts
- Digital art education
- The arts
- Visual arts
- Room 13 International
