= Francis P. Shepard Medal =

Award from the Society for Sedimentary Geology

The Francis P. Shepard Medal for Marine Geology is an academic award established by the Society for Sedimentary Geology. The medal is named after Francis Parker Shepard (1897 – 1985), who was an American sedimentologist. The medal has been awarded since 1967. The medal is awarded in recognition of "Excellence in Marine Geology", and is awarded for a sustained record of outstanding research contributions to marine geology or marine sedimentology. More than 20 years must have elapsed since the awardee received their PhD.

== Past recipients ==
- 1967 David G. Moore
- 1968 Alexander P. Lisitzin
- 1969 Kenneth O. Emery
- 1970 Joseph R. Curray
- 1971 Philip Kuenen
- 1972 L. M. J. U. Van Straaten
- 1973 W. Armstrong Price
- 1974 Hans-Erich Reineck
- 1975 Bruce C. Heezen
- 1976 John I. Ewing
- 1977 Henry William Menard
- 1978 Tjeerd van Andel
- 1979 Robert S. Dietz
- 1980 James M. Coleman
- 1981 William W. Hay
- 1982 Arnold H. Bouma
- 1983 Donn S. Gorsline
- 1984 Walter C. Pitman III
- 1985 Nicholas John Shackleton
- 1986 Peter A. Rona
- 1987 Orrin H. Pilkey
- 1988 Seymour O. Schlanger
- 1989 Donald J. P. Swift
- 1990 Daniel J. Stanley
- 1991 Elazar Uchupi
- 1992 John D. Milliman
- 1993 William B. F. Ryan
- 1994 Maria Cita
- 1995 Ian Nicholas McCave
- 1996 Michael A. Arthur
- 1997 Miles O. Hayes
- 1998 Bilal Haq
- 1999 Richard A. "Skip" Davis
- 2000 Edward L. Winterer
- 2001 Wolfgang Berger
- 2002 James P. Kennett
- 2003 Harry Roberts
- 2004 Richard Sternberg
- 2005 William Normark
- 2006 Michael Sarnthein
- 2007 John B. Anderson
- 2008 Charles Nittrouer
- 2009 Albert C. Hine
- 2010 David J.W. Piper
- 2011 Miriam Kastner
- 2012 James V. Gardner
- 2013 J. Casey Moore
- 2014 Gerold Wefer
- 2015 Enrico Bonatti
- 2016 Jaia Syvitski
- 2017 Lynn Donelson Wright
- 2018 Peter Townsend Harris
- 2019 Charles Kerr Paull
- 2020 Miriam Katz
- 2021 Stanley Riggs
- 2022 Lionel Carter
- 2023 Philip Barnes
- 2024 Duncan FitzGerald

== See also ==
- List of geology awards
- List of awards named after people
