= John Milliman =

American marine geologist

John D. Milliman (born 5 May 1938) is a retired American Emeritus Professor of marine geology. He is a professor emeritus in the department of physical sciences and in the Virginia Institute of Marine Science at the College of William & Mary.

== Education ==
Milliman earned Bachelor of Science from the University of Rochester, a Master of Science from the University of Washington, Seattle, and a PhD from the University of Miami. In 1969-70 he was an Alexander von Humbolt Fellow at the University of Heidelberg, and in 1981 he was a guest professor at the University of Oslo (Norway).

== Research ==
In 1968, Milliman and K.O. Emery published an article in Science suggesting that the Holocene transgression began 14,000 years ago and was over by 7,000 years ago. In 2003 he and Jonathan A. Warrick found that rivers of Southern California, such as Santa Clara River and Transverse Ranges, discharge a huge amount of sediment especially during El Niño–Southern Oscillation. In 2005 Milliman studied seven rivers in Taiwan after typhoon Herb swept through the region. He and his colleagues also studied the following river and shelf systems: Yangtze, Yellow, Fly, etc.

Milliman was named one of Virginia's "outstanding scientists" by Governor Bob McDonnell in 2012.

== Selected publications ==
- J.D. Milliman (6 December 2012). Recent Sedimentary Carbonates: Part 1 Marine Carbonates. Springer Science & Business Media. ISBN 978-3-642-65528-9. (pbk reprint of 1974 publication)
- John D. Milliman; Katherine L. Farnsworth (28 March 2013). River Discharge to the Coastal Ocean: A Global Synthesis. Cambridge University Press. ISBN 978-1-139-49350-5.
