= Jian Zhimin =

Chinese oceanographer (born 1966)

- 翦知湣
- Born: December 1966 (age 59); Changde, Hunan, China
- Education: Peking University; Tongji University
- Scientific career
- Fields: Marine geology
- Workplaces: School of Ocean and Earth Science, Tongji University

Jian Zhimin (Chinese: 翦知湣; pinyin: Jiǎn Zhīmǐn; born December 1966) was a Chinese geologist of Uygur ethnicity, and an academician of the Chinese Academy of Sciences.

== Biography ==
Jian was born in Changde, Hunan, in December 1966. In 1983, he enrolled at Peking University, graduating in 1987 with a bachelor's degree in paleontology and stratigraphy. He went on to receive his master's degree in marine geology in 1990 and doctor's degree in geology in 1993 at Tongji University.

After graduating in 1993, Jian stayed for teaching. In 1995, he became a visiting scholar at the Institute of Geology and Paleontology, Kiel University. He returned to China in 1996 and continued to teach at Tongji University, where he was promoted to associate professor in 1996 and to full professor in 1999. In 2000, he was appointed as a "Changjiang Scholar" (or " Yangtze River Scholar") by the Ministry of Education of the People's Republic of China. In June 2012, he was elevated to dean of the School of Ocean and Earth Science.

== Honours and awards ==
- November 2023 Member of the Chinese Academy of Sciences (CAS)
