= Orrin H. Pilkey =

American marine geologist (1934–2024)

Orrin Pilkey
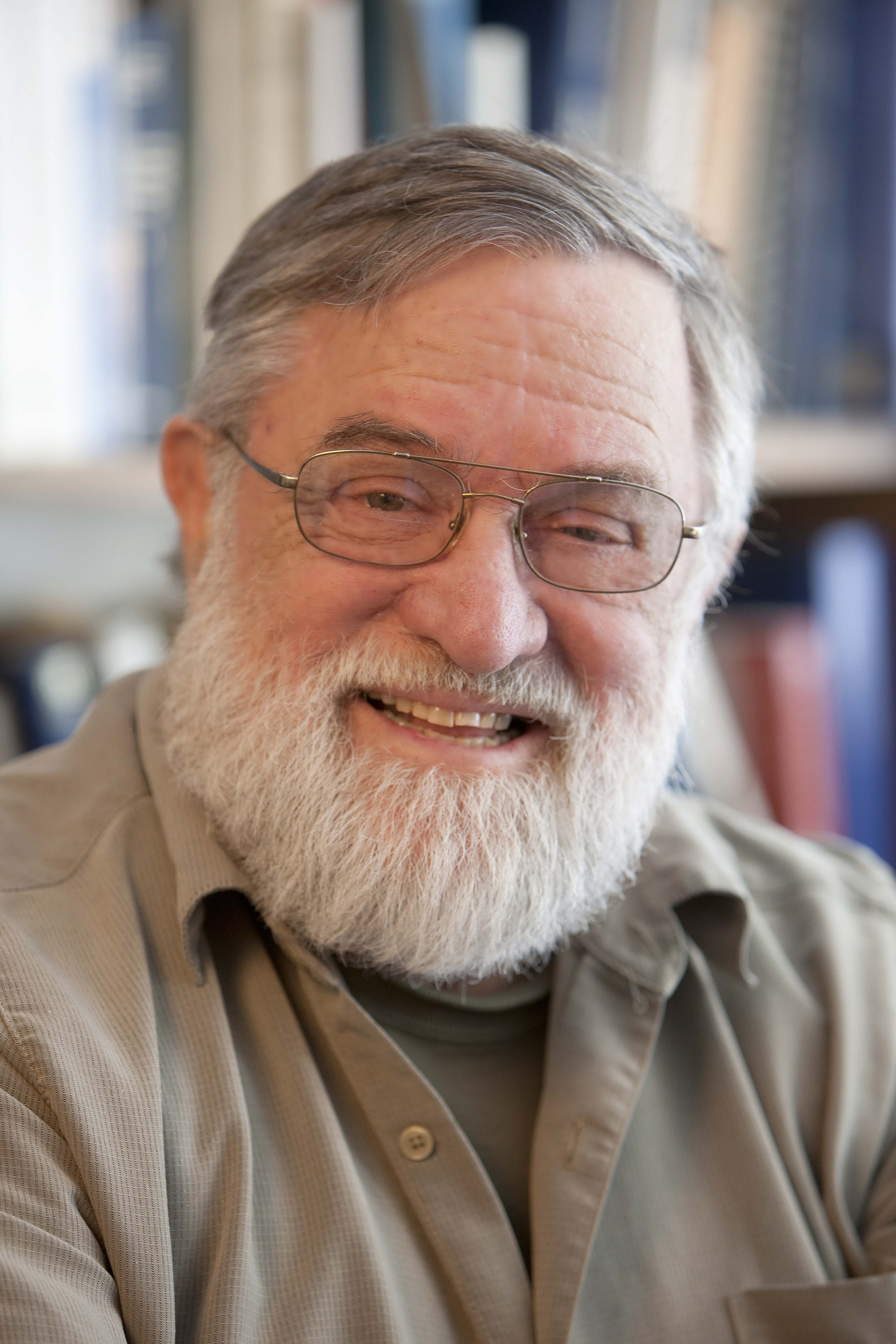
- Born: Orrin Hendren Pilkey Jr. September 14, 1934; New York City, U.S.
- Died: December 13, 2024 (aged 90); Durham, North Carolina, U.S.
- Education: Florida State University; University of Montana; Washington State College
- Occupation: Professor at Duke University
- Awards: Francis P. Shepard Medal (1987), GSA Public Service Award (2000)

Orrin Hendren Pilkey Jr. (September 19, 1934 – December 13, 2024) was an American marine geologist who was Professor Emeritus of Earth and Ocean Sciences, Nicholas School of the Environment, at Duke University, and founder and director emeritus of the Program for the Study of Developed Shorelines (PSDS) based at Western Carolina University.

== Life and career ==
Orrin Hendren Pilkey Jr. was born in New York City on September 19, 1934. He received his B.S. degree in geology at Washington State College, his M.S. degree in geology at the University of Montana and his Ph.D. degree in geology at Florida State University. Between 1962 and 1965, he was a research professor at the University of Georgia Marine Institute on Sapelo Island. He has been at Duke University since 1965, with one year breaks with the Department of Marine Science at the University of Puerto Rico, Mayagüez, and with the U.S. Geological Survey in Woods Hole, Massachusetts.

Pilkey began his career with the study of abyssal plains on the deep sea floor. As a result of the destruction of his parents' house in Waveland, Mississippi in Hurricane Camille (1969), he switched to the study of coasts. Pilkey's research centers on both basic and applied coastal geology, focusing primarily on barrier island coasts and the effects of shoreline stabilization and development, and sea level rise. The PSDS has analyzed the numerical models used by coastal geologists and engineers to predict the movement of beach sand, especially in beach replenishment. In general, Pilkey argues that mathematical models cannot be used to accurately predict the behavior of beaches, although they can be useful if directional or orders-of-magnitude answers are sought. In the book, Useless Arithmetic, written with his daughter, Linda Pilkey-Jarvis, they argue that the outcome of natural processes in general cannot be accurately predicted by mathematical models. The Rising Sea, written with Rob Young, current director of PSDS, focuses on the global threat from sea level rise. The Last Beach sounds the alarm that recreation on many of the world's beaches is going to be a thing of the past. It explains that "the future of the world's beaches hangs in the balance, from big threats such as engineering, mining, and pollution, to activities that seem harmless, like driving on beaches." In many places, pollution is in the beach sand as well as in the water. Retreat from a Rising Sea, written with daughter, Linda, and son, Keith, highlights the need for moving back from the coast, a process that is already beginning in some parts of the world, such as Arctic barrier islands, atolls, and river deltas. The authors think that New Orleans and Miami, among other cities, are doomed. His most recent book, Lessons from the Sand, offers easy experiments for kids (and adults)to do while learning about beach processes. Orrin co-wrote this colorful book which is completely illustrated by his son and co-author, Charles Pilkey, an artist/sculptor.

Pilkey has published more than 250 technical publications and 45 books and has appeared in several documentary films (see below).

Pilkey died at his home in Durham, North Carolina, on December 13, 2024, at the age of 90.

== Awards and honors ==
Pilkey received numerous awards and honors. Among them the Francis Parker Shepard medal for excellence in marine geology in 1987, and in 2003, the Priestley Award, for distinguished research in coastal geology and public service in policy formulation and education about America's coastal resources, presented by Dickinson College, Pennsylvania. In 1990, the North Carolina Wildlife Federation in cooperation with theNational Wildlife Federation, presenting Pilkey the Governor's Award, for Conservation Educator of the Year. Several others include: 1992, George V. Cohee Public Service Award, Eastern Section, AAPG, in recognition of the many accomplishments and untiring efforts in research and public education concerning the processes and geologic hazards in coastal zones, from The American Association of Petroleum Geologists; 1993, James H. Shea Award, for exceptional contributions in the form of writing and/or editing of Earth Science materials, from the National Association of Geology Teachers; 1993, American Geological Institute Award, for outstanding contributions to the public understanding of geology, for developing the 20-volume book series, Living with the Shore (with William Neal); and in 2001, he received the Honorary Doctor of Science Degree, University of the South (Sewanee), Sewanee, Tennessee. Pilkey received the GSA Public Service Award for his contribution to public awareness of Earth sciences or for using science to resolve significant societal problems. In 2012, Duke University honored Pilkey by naming a new research building after him at the Duke Marine Laboratory, Beaufort, North Carolina.

== Publications ==
=== Books ===
- Newton, J.G., O.H. Pilkey, and J.O. Blanton, 1971. An Oceanographic Atlas of the Carolina Continental Margin. N.C. Dept. of Conservation and Development, 57 pages.
- Swift, D.J.P., D.B. Duane, and O.H. Pilkey (eds.), 1972. Shelf Sediment Transport, Process and Pattern. Stroudsburg, PA: Dowden, Hutchinson and Ross, Inc., 656 pages.
- Pilkey, O.H., O.H. Pilkey Sr., and R. Turner, 1975. How to Live With an Island. Raleigh, NC: Dept. of Natural and Economic Resources, 191 pages.
- Pilkey, O.H., and S.J. Fritz (eds.), 1976. A Marine Atlas of Puerto Rico. San German, Puerto Rico: M.J. Cerame VIVAS, Inc., 139 pages.
- Pilkey, O.H., W.J. Neal, and O.H. Pilkey Sr., 1978. From Currituck to Calabash. Raleigh, NC: N.C. Science and Technology Research Center, 228 pages. 2nd edition, 191 pages. 3rd edition, Durham, NC: Duke University Press.
- Kaufman, W., and O.H. Pilkey. 1979. The Beaches Are Moving: The Drowning of America's Shoreline. Anchor Doubleday, 326 pages. (Book of the Month Club Alternate Selection, 1980). Paperback edition (1983), Durham, NC: Duke University Press. 336 pages.
- Pilkey, O.H. Sr., W.D. Pilkey, O.H. Pilkey Jr., and W.J. Neal, 1984. Coastal Design, A Guide for Planners, Developers and Homeowners. New York: Van Nostrand Reinhold, 224 pages.
- Nummedal, D., O.H. Pilkey, and J.D. Howard (eds.), 1987. Sea Level Rise and Coastal Evolution (Armstrong Price Symposium). Society of Economic Paleontologists and Mineralogists Special Publication #41, 266 pages.
- Kraus, N.C., and O.H. Pilkey (eds.), 1988. The Effects of Seawalls on the Beach. Journal of Coastal Research Special Issue #4, 146 pages.
- Finkl, C., and O.H. Pilkey (eds.), 1991. The Impacts of Hurricane Hugo. Sept. 10–22, 1989. Journal of Coastal Research Special Issue #8.
- Bush, D.M., O.H. Pilkey, and W.J. Neal. 1996. Living by the Rules of the Sea. Durham, NC: Duke University Press. 179 pages.
- Pilkey, O.H., and K.L. Dixon. 1996. The Corps and the Shore. Washington, D.C.: Island Press. 272 pages.
- Pilkey, O.H., and M.E. Fraser. 2003. A Celebration of the World's Barrier Islands. New York: Columbia University Press. 309 pages.
- Pilkey, O.H., T.M. Rice, and W.J. Neal. 2004. How to Read a North Carolina Beach. Chapel Hill, NC: University of North Carolina Press. 162 pages. ISBN 978-0-8078-5510-2
- Neal, W.J., O.H. Pilkey, and J.T. Kelley. 2007. Atlantic Coast Beaches: A Guide to Ripples, Dunes, and Other Natural Features of the Seashore. Missoula, MT: Mountain Press Publishing Company. 272 pages.
- Pilkey, O.H., and L. Pilkey-Jarvis. 2007. Useless Arithmetic: Why Environmental Scientists Can’t Predict the Future. New York: Columbia University Press. 230 pages. ISBN 978-0-231-13213-8
- Pilkey, O.H., and R. Young. 2009. The Rising Sea. Washington, D.C.: Island Press. 203 pages. ISBN 978-1-59726-191-3
- Kelley, J.T., O.H. Pilkey, and J.A.G. Cooper (eds.), 2009. America's Most Vulnerable Coastal Communities. Geological Society of America Special Paper 460, 179 pages.
- Pilkey, O.H., and K.C. Pilkey. 2011. Global Climate Change: A Primer. Durham, NC: Duke University Press. 142 pages. ISBN 978-0-8223-5109-2
- Pilkey, O.H., W.J. Neal, J.T. Kelley, J.A.G. Cooper. 2011. The World's Beaches: A Global Guide to the Science of the Shoreline. Berkeley, CA: University of California Press. 283 pages.
- Cooper, J.A.G., and O.H. Pilkey (eds.). 2012. Pitfalls of Shoreline Stabilization: Selected Case Studies. New York: Springer. 333 pages.
- Pilkey, O.H., and J.A.G. Cooper. 2014. The Last Beach. Durham, NC: Duke University Press. 264 pages. ISBN 978-0-8223-5809-1
- Pilkey, C.O., and O.H. Pilkey. 2016. Lessons from the Sand: Family-Friendly Science Activities You Can Do On A Carolina Beach. Chapel Hill, NC: University of North Carolina Press. 221 pages.
- Pilkey, O.H., L. Pilkey-Jarvis, and K.C. Pilkey. 2016. Retreat from a Rising Sea: Hard Choices in an Age of Climate Change. New York: Columbia University Press. 214 pages.
- Pilkey, O.H., Keith C. Pilkey. 2019. Sea Level Rise: A Slow Tsunami on America's Shores. Durham, NC: Duke University Press.
- Pilkey, O.H., Charles O. Pilkey, Linda P. Pilkey-Jarvis, Norma J. Longo, Keith C. Pilkey, Fred B. Dodson, Hannah L. Hayes. 2024. Escaping Nature: How to Survive Global Climate Change. Durham, NC: Duke University Press.

=== Selected articles ===
- Thieler, E.R., et al. 2000. "The Use of Mathematical Models to Predict Beach Behavior for U.S. Coastal Engineering: A Critical Review." Journal of Coastal Research 16(1):48-70.
- Pilkey, O.H., J.A.G. Cooper, and D.A. Lewis. 2009. "Global distribution and geomorphology of fetch-limited barrier islands." Journal of Coastal Research 25(4):819–837.
- Stutz, M.L., and O.H. Pilkey. 2011. "Open-ocean Barrier Islands: Global Influence of Climatic, Oceanographic, and Depositional Settings." Journal of Coastal Research 27(2):207–222.
- Pilkey, O.H., Jan. 2012. "What Do You Do When the Models Get It Wrong?" American Geosciences Institute. EARTH Magazine, p. 70.
- Pilkey, O.H., R. Young, A. Coburn, and N.J. Longo. 2012. "Rethinking Living Shorelines."
- Glass, A., and O.H. Pilkey, March 2013. "Denying Sea-Level Rise. How 100 Centimeters Divided the State of North Carolina." American Geosciences Institute. EARTH Magazine, pp. 26–33.
- Pilkey, O.H., R. Young, and J.A.G. Cooper, 2013. "Quantitative modeling of coastal processes. A boom or a bust for society?" In Baker, V.R. (ed.), Rethinking the Fabric of Geology (125th Anniversary Volume). Geological Society of America Special Paper 502, pp. 135–144.
- Pilkey, O.H., and J.A.G. Cooper, 2014. "Are Natural Beaches Facing Extinction?" In: Green, A.N. and J.A.G. Cooper (eds.), Proceedings 13th International Coastal Symposium (Durban, South Africa). Journal of Coastal Research Special Issue No. 70, pp. 431–436. Coconut Creek (Florida), ISSN 0749-0208.
- Neal, W.J., O.H. Pilkey, J.A.G. Cooper, and N.J. Longo, 2017. "Why Coastal Regulations Fail." Ocean & Coastal Management. xxx: 1–14.

== Documentaries and videos ==
- The Beaches Are Moving (1992): 1 hour North Carolina PBS production, produced by Michael Sheehan.
- Living on the Edge (1996): 1-hour production by Environmental Media, Inc.
- Dynamic Shorelines (2009): (7:30) Part of Physical Geology online (distance learning course), produced by Dallas TeleLearning, Dallas County Community College District (Texas). Lynn Millwood, Ph.D. (editor), Craig Mayes (Executive Producer).
- Sand Wars (2013): Documentary film based on the mining of sand from beaches; produced by Guillaume Rappeneau and directed by Denis Delestrac.
- Shored Up (2013): Documentary film regarding climate change, beaches, and their relationships; produced and directed by Ben Kalina.
