= Maria Bianca Cita =

Italian geologist and paleontologist (1924–2024)

- Born: September 12, 1924; Milan, Italy
- Died: August 12, 2024 (aged 99); Italy
- Education: University of Milan
- Occupations: Geologist, paleontologist, oceanographer
- Employer: University of Milan
- Known for: Research on the Messinian salinity crisis; Ocean Drilling Program
- Awards: Feltrinelli Prize (1986); Francis P. Shepard Medal (1996)

Maria Bianca Cita (12 September 1924 – 12 August 2024) was an Italian geologist and paleontologist.

== Biography ==
She was born in Milan and graduated in geology from the University of Milan in 1946. She lectured there on micropaleontology, physical geography, engineering geology, geology and stratigraphy. In 1973, she became a full professor, teaching in turn micropaleontology, geology and marine geology. From 1982 to 1988, she was head of the earth sciences department at the University of Milan.

In 1992, she was president of the European Science Foundation scientific committee for the Ocean Drilling Program. She was president of the Italian geological society (Società geologica italiana) from 1989 to 1990, the first woman to hold that office. From 1994 to 1997, she was president of the Italian Association for Quaternary Research (AIQUA}.

Cita participated in the 1970 exploration of the Mediterranean sea floor by the research vessel Glomar Challenger which collected data on the Messinian salinity crisis.

She published over 200 articles in various journals on micropaleontology, stratigraphy, paleoclimatology, paleoceanography and marine geology. She served on the editorial boards for journals in the fields of micropaleontology, geology, oceanography and stratigraphy.

In 1986, she received the Feltrinelli Prize from the Accademia dei Lincei. Cita was named an honorary fellow of the Geological Society of America in 1987. In 1996, she was awarded the Francis P. Shepard Medal for Marine Geology.

Cita died on 12 August 2024, at the age of 99.
