= Continental drip =

Humorous geographical observation

In a classic map of the world (with north at the top), the southern ends of the continental landmasses appear to "drip" downward.

Continental drip is the observation that southward-pointing landforms are more numerous and prominent than northward-pointing landforms. For example, Africa, South America, the Indian subcontinent, and Greenland all taper off to a point towards the south. The name is a play on continental drift.

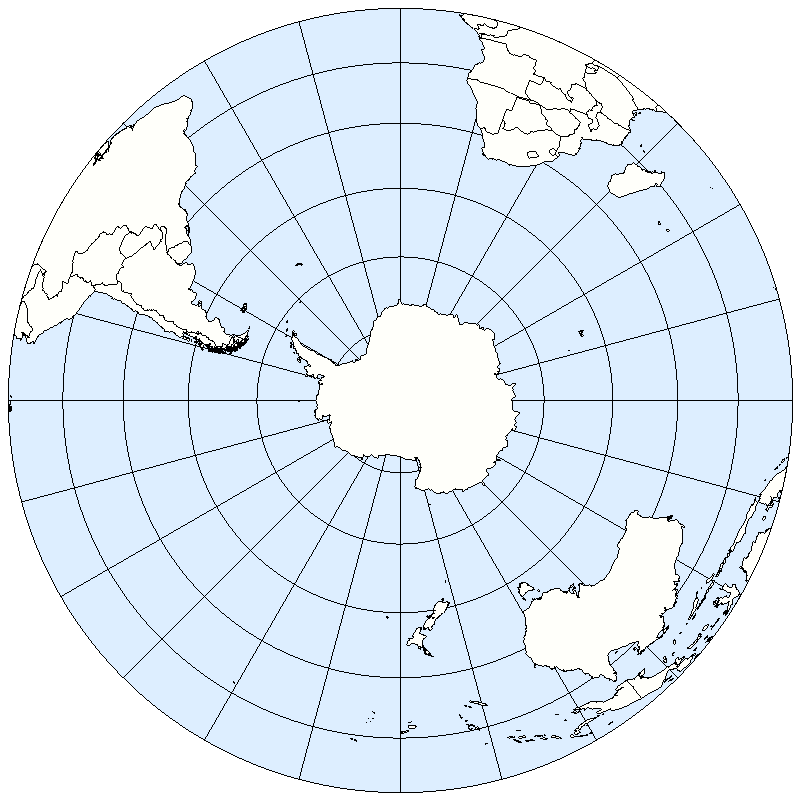
The Southern Hemisphere from above the South Pole

The observation was made by Ormonde de Kay in a 1973 tongue-in-cheek paper, which he introduced as "another earth-shaking new theory derived from simply looking at maps." It satirizes the acceptance of plate tectonics theory as it was being formulated and refined at the time to describe the movement of the Earth's continents that is now thoroughly accepted. Given examples of smaller-than-continental drips include Baja California Peninsula, Florida, all of Europe's peninsulas except Jutland (Italy, Greece, Iberia, Scandinavia, Crimea) as well as in southeast Asia, the Malay Peninsula and Indochina.

John C. Holden expanded and illustrated his own version of the idea in 1976, almost entirely as a parody, in the Journal of Irreproducible Results. In Holden's expansion of the concept, he satirically invents the fictional German words Südpolarfluchtkraft ("south polar fleeing force") having created Südpolarfluchttropfen ("south polar fleeing drips"). He does, however, cite an actual theory of northward drift of Gondwanaland descendant continents of Australia, Africa, South America, and India breaking away from Antarctica, which he authored with Robert S. Dietz in 1970. As part of the 1976 parody paper, he proposes that the "drips" or "sub-drips" are North America, Greenland, South America, Africa, Arabia, India, Asia, and Australia. Contrarily, "anti-drips" are formed by Sri Lanka and Antarctica itself because Antarctica is "on top of the world" as all the continents draw away from it.

== See also ==
- Land and water hemispheres
- South up map orientation
