= Kenneth O. Emery =

- Born: June 6, 1914; Swift Current, Saskatchewan, Canada
- Died: April 12, 1998 (aged 83); Milton, Massachusetts, US
- Education: University of Illinois
- Scientific career
- Fields: Marine geology
- Workplaces: University of Southern California; Woods Hole Oceanographic Institution
- Doctoral advisor: Francis Shepard

Kenneth Orris Emery (1914–1998) was a Canadian-born American marine geologist.

== Biography ==
Emery grew up in Texas and studied engineering at North Texas Agricultural College. He then studied geology at the University of Illinois, where he received in 1935 a B.S. and in 1939 an M.S. In 1937 he and another graduate student, Robert S. Dietz, moved with their mentor Francis Parker Shepard from the University of Illinois to the Scripps Institution of Oceanography in La Jolla, California. There Emery pursued doctoral research on the California continental margin. He received in 1941 his Ph.D. in geology from the University of Illinois. During WW II, he worked in San Diego and produced maps for the U.S. Navy of sediment types from oceanographic surveys. The maps were important for acoustic submarine warfare and scientific understanding of continental margins. At the end of WW II he moved to Los Angeles and joined the faculty of the University of Southern California (USC) as an assistant professor and was later promoted to full professor.

Between 1946 and 1960 he also worked, mostly part-time, for the U.S. Geological Survey, and served as Oceanographer at the Navy Ordnance Center in Pasadena from 1960 to 1962.

For the academic year 1958–1959 he was on a leave of absence as a Guggenheim Fellow.

In 1959, K. O. visited the Dead Sea on a Guggenheim Fellowship and studied the circulation of water and the salt formations in this graben. Again, years later, the geological processes evinced by these observations were presented in a book titled The Destruction of Sodom, Gomorrah, and Jericho, which he wrote with David Neev, his former student and colleague.

His 1960 book, The Sea Off Southern California, A Modern Habitat of Petroleum is considered a classic. In 1962 he left USC and joined the marine geology group of Woods Hole Oceanographic Institution (WHOI). At WHOI he was a senior scientist from 1963 to 1975, the acting dean of the joint WHOI/MIT graduate program in 1968, and the Henry Bryant Bigelow Oceanographer from 1975 to 1979, retiring as scientist emeritus in 1979. He was the author or co-author of about 360 scientific publications, including 15 books.

During his years at WHOI, he embarked on an extensive survey of the continental margins of the Atlantic ocean, a project finally completed in 1973, with the help of WHOI's Atlantis II, the first academic research vessel equipped with a seagoing computer lab.

Emery and his wife lived for many years at the head of Oyster Pond in Falmouth, Massachusetts. At his home there he maintained an orchard and apiary and produced his classic 1969 monograph A Coastal Pond Studied by Oceanographic Methods.

During the passage of Hurricane Gloria in 1985, K. O. was in his yard measuring temperature, wind force and direction, and precipitation, and was thus able to document the snuffing out of the hurricane at its peak by entrainment of cold air from a front to the west.

He is the namesake of the "Emery rod method" used in studies of the dynamics of sand dunes and coastal beaches.

His marriage of 42 years ended with the death of his wife in 1983. Upon his death he was survived by two daughters and a granddaughter.

== Awards and honors ==
- 1958 — Guggenheim Fellow
- 1968 — Foreign member of Academia Sinica
- 1969 — Francis P. Shepard Medal for Marine Geology, Society of Economic Paleontologists and Mineralogists
- 1971 — Member of the National Academy of Sciences
- 1971 — Prince Albert I Medal
- 1974 — Compass Distinguished Achievement Award, Marine Technical Society
- 1977 — Foreign member of the Royal Swedish Academy of Sciences
- 1985 — Maurice Ewing Medal
- 1989 — William H. Twenhofel Medal

== Selected publications ==
- Shepard, F. P.; Emery, K. O. (1941). Submarine Topography off the California Coast: Canyons and Tectonic Interpretation. ISBN 9780813720319.
- Emery, Kenneth Orris; Tracey Jr., Joshua Irving; Ladd, H. S. (1954). "Geology of Bikini and nearby atolls: Part 1, Geology". Geological Survey Professional Paper (260–A). Washington, D.C.: U.S. Government Printing Office. doi:10.3133/pp260A.
- Emery, Kenneth Orris (1962). "Marine geology of Guam". Geological Survey Professional Paper. Professional Paper (403-B). Washington, D.C.: U.S. Government Printing Office. doi:10.3133/pp403B.
- Neev (Nîv), David (Dāwid); Emery, Kenneth Orris (1995). The Destruction of Sodom, Gomorrah, and Jericho: Geological, Climatological, and Archaeological Background. ISBN 9780195090949.
- Kenneth O. Emery; Elazar Uchupi (6 December 2012). The Geology of the Atlantic Ocean. Springer Science & Business Media. ISBN 978-1-4612-5278-8. (pbk reprint of 1984 original)
- Elazar Uchupi; Kenneth O. Emery (6 December 2012). Morphology of the Rocky Members of the Solar System. Springer Science & Business Media. ISBN 978-3-642-87550-2. (pbk reprint of 1994 original)
- Emery, K. O.; Aubrey, David G. (2012-12-06). Sea Levels, Land Levels, and Tide Gauges. ISBN 9781461391012.
