= Douglas Inman =

Douglas L. Inman
- Born: Douglas Lamar Inman; July 7, 1920; Guam, Mariana Islands
- Died: February 11, 2016 (aged 95); La Jolla, California, U.S.
- Education: San Diego State University (B.A., 1942); University of California, Los Angeles (M.S., 1948; Ph.D., 1953)
- Known for: Coastal oceanography; Sediment transport; Beach and nearshore processes
- Awards: Guggenheim Fellowship (1961); International Coastal Engineering Award, American Society of Civil Engineers (1988); ASCE Award for Outstanding Contributions (2000)
- Honors: Fellow of the Geological Society of America (1960); Fellow of the American Association for the Advancement of Science (1998)
- Scientific career
- Fields: Oceanography; Marine geology
- Workplaces: Scripps Institution of Oceanography; University of California, San Diego
- Thesis: Areal and Seasonal Variations in Beach and Nearshore Sediments at La Jolla, California (1953)
- Doctoral advisor: Francis Parker Shepard

Douglas Lamar Inman (July 7, 1920 – February 11, 2016) was a professor of Oceanography at the Scripps Institution of Oceanography.

Born in Guam, the Marianas Islands, he received his B.A in physics/geology in 1942 from California State University, San Diego (now San Diego State University), his M.S. (in 1948) and Ph.D. (in 1953) in oceanography from the University of California, Los Angeles. His research was done at Scripps Institution of Oceanography, under the direction of Francis Parker Shepard. His dissertation title was Areal and Seasonal Variations in Beach and Nearshore Sediments at La Jolla, California. He was a professor of marine geology or oceanography in the University of California system since 1953 most recently as professor of oceanography at the University of California, San Diego and at the Center for Coastal Studies at Scripps.

He received a Guggenheim Fellowship in 1961, the International Coastal Engineering Award, American Society of Civil Engineers, 1988, and the ASCE Award for outstanding contributions to the Civil Engineering Profession, American Society of Civil Engineering, Hydrology and Hydraulics Technical Group in 2000. He was a Fellow of the Geological Society of America (1960), and a Fellow of the American Association for the Advancement of Science (1998). He was involved with a variety of international organizations and projects including the Middle East Cooperative Study and teaching in Vietnam through UNESCO. He acted as a consultant, expert witness, and arbiter on issues related to coastal oceanography. His research focused on coastal oceanography, sediment transport, waves, effects of waves on beaches, and beach and nearshore processes.

His film, "The Beach: A River of Sand," received the Orbit Award for Best Scientific Teaching Film, International Film Festival, 1967. He died in La Jolla, California at the age of 95 on February 11, 2016.
