= John C. Holden =

American geologist, illustrator, and humorist (born 1934)

- Born: 1934 (age 91–92); Panama
- Education: San Diego State University
- Occupations: geophysicist and scientific illustrator
- Known for: research in seafloor spreading, scientific humor

John C. Holden (born 1934), often called Jack Holden, is an American geologist, scientific illustrator, and humorist known for his early research into tectonic drift with Robert S. Dietz in the 1960s and 1970s. In 1976 he founded the "International Society to Stop Continental Drift", a tongue-in-cheek organization which attracted hundreds of members and had the motto, "Eschew Sea-Floor Spreading".

== Early life ==
Holden was born in 1934 in Colón, Panama, and was raised in San Diego by his mother and her husband Warren Holden, a Navy officer. Holden's biological father was a San Diego milkman named Bud. As a child in the 1940s, Holden explored the canyons of California for days at a time and hunted rabbits with a pellet gun. When he played blackjack and acey-deucey with friends, he was known to bring a paper with the pre-calculated winning odds.

Holden disliked schoolwork and preferred to draw cartoons in his notebook. Due to his learning difficulties, he was enrolled in specialized program from the San Diego State University's teacher college. In sixth grade, he developed an art style called "psychodoodles" during class. Holden eventually graduated from high school at age 21, and was accepted into San Diego State University, where he studied geology, earning a master's degree in 1961.

== Geology research career ==
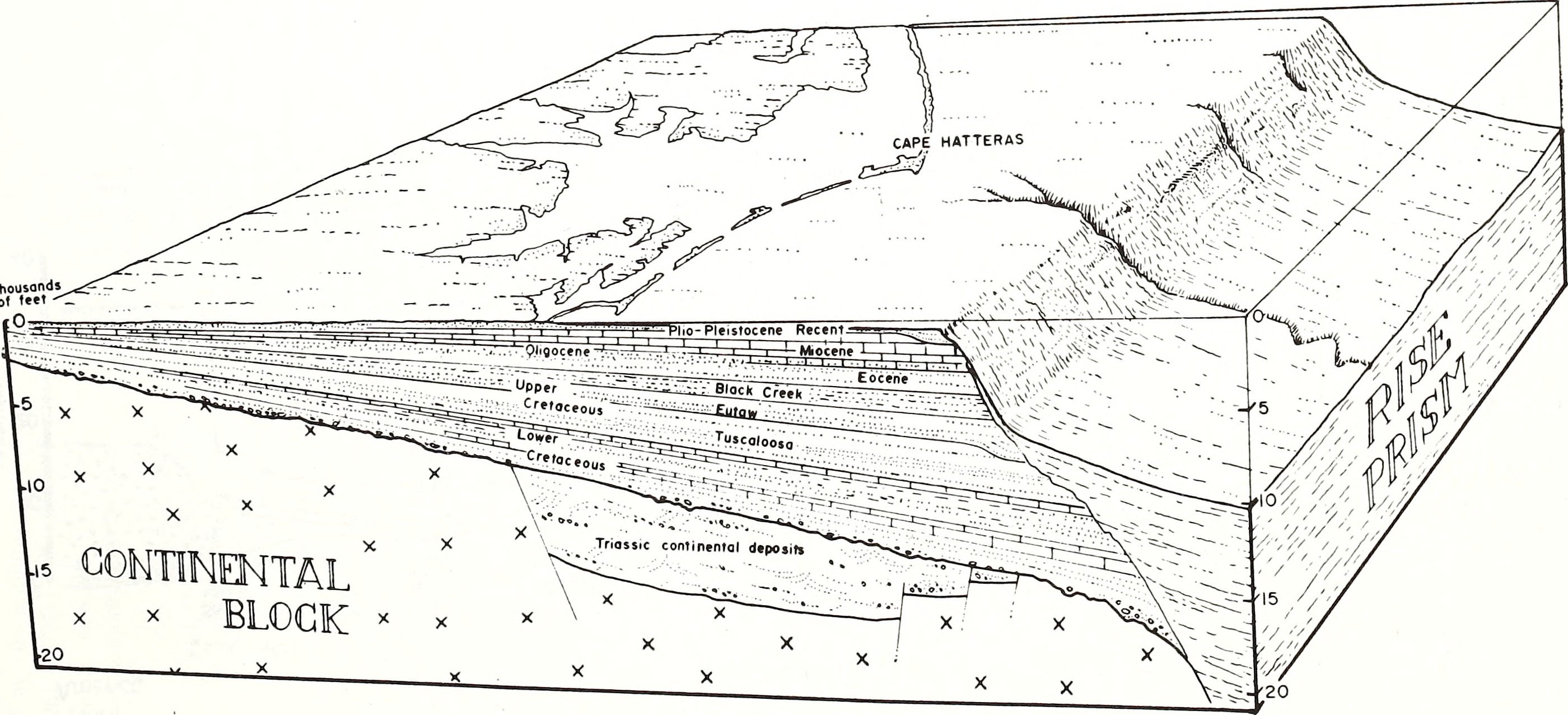
Holden's illustration of a continental terrace wedge published by the National Oceanic and Atmospheric Administration in 1968

In 1961, Holden was hired by the Naval Electronics Laboratory geologist Robert S. Dietz, a prominent researcher in the new and controversial fields of plate tectonics and impact craters. For more than 10 years, Holden served as Dietz' illustrator and collaborator, adding creative elements and scientific diagrams in many of Dietz' journal articles, for which Holden was named co-author. Dietz and Holden were early "drifters", advocates for the theory that Earth was covered by slowly drifting tectonic plates. They theorized that the Moon's surface was static, and that its craters were 3 billion-year-old remnants of astroid collisions.

The decade-long collaboration between Dietz and Holden involved stints in Washington, D.C. and Miami. During this period, Holden studied in a paleontology PhD program at the University of California, Berkeley but failed to graduate despite finishing his dissertation because he could not meet the requirement to read technical German. In 1973, Holden lost his job with Dietz due to budget cuts.

== Independent endeavors and publications ==
Holden later said that in the 1970s, "I more or less reconciled myself to being a dropout" and "decided to try to make it on my own." He continued to publish his illustrations and science writing, and began selling products including his "psychodoodle" drawings and custom globes with moveable continents that he had developed for Dietz. He founded (and later sold) Softwear Unlimited, which sold graphic tees with science jokes, such as an illustration of Einstein as a traffic police enforcing the speed of light: "186,000 miles per second is not only a good idea. It's the law."

In 1973, he began working with William R. Corliss to compile the multivolume "Catalog of Anomalies", which contained unusual or unexplained results from old scientific publications. The books were praised by the journal Science, and the science fiction author Arthur C. Clarke was a fan of them.

Holden collaborated with Dietz again on their self-published 1987 book, Creation/Evolution Satiricon: Creationism Bashed, a takedown of religion. He has illustrated work by Peter Vogt, poetry books by the oceanographer Harris B. Stewart Jr.

== Humor ==
=== Journal of Irreproducible Results ===
Holden contributed humor writing to the Journal of Irreproducible Results. Editor Norman Sperling later called Holden the publication's "most memorable" writer.

=== International Stop Continental Drift Society ===
In 1976, Holden founded a satirical club called the "International Stop Continental Drift Society" which aimed to put an end to seafloor spreading, volcanic activity, and earthquakes greater than 4.0 on the Richter scale. He jokingly told Newsweek that "something had to be done" because China and California would converge and cause "Communists to marry our children". He promoted a tongue-in-cheek counter-theory called "continental drip", based on the observation that continents appear to drip down toward the South Pole.

Members paid $5 annual dues for a society newsletter published sporadically, "like natural disasters", that featured humor, research, and cartoons (such as a drawing of a whooshing continent rapidly approaching, captioned "Look Out! Here Comes Africa"). Society headquarters was the house in Winthrop where Holden lived with his elderly mother, and it was included in the Encyclopedia of Associations. Bumper stickers for the group had the slogan "Stop Continental Drift", as well as "Reunite Gondwanaland" and "Join the Mothers' March Against Volcanos". Arthur A. Meyerhoff, prominent tectonic theory researcher, displayed the sticker on his car.

By the mid-1980s, the Society had grown to 700 members, including both supporters of tectonic theory and a sect of opponents, which Holden estimated at 10% to 20% of the group. Members from the geology department of Leiden University held a humorous event on campus to "bolt down" the Eurasian plate. For the 40th anniversary of the prank in 2018, the university brought Holden and his wife to campus, where Holden presented an unconventional pet theory that continental drift was not caused by heat currents but by the spin of Earth.

=== Other humorous endeavors ===
Holden also founded the "Manzana Institute of Geotechnic Redundancies" and the "Friends of the Okanogan Lobe" (FOOLs), a group of retirees that makes local expeditions to study glacial geology.

== Personal life ==
Holden was unmarried for much of his career, and "didn't want to be sucked into a system where you have a demanding wife and a bunch of kids" that limit career options. In 1973 he bought a house with his brother in Kirkland, before later moving deeper into the woods, in Winthrop, with his elderly mother. When he moved her into a nursing home in 1989, he met his future wife Linda, who worked there. Linda later said, "It was his brain I fell in love with".

In 1990 the couple moved to an octagonal, off-the-grid home within the Colville Indian Reservation in Okanogan County, Washington. The home uses solar power, well water, and a wood stove for heat, and he installed a gas generator so that Linda can watch television. They have about seven cats. A neighbor lives in an astronomical observatory that Holden built on the property.

=== Personality and hobbies ===
Though he lacks an official diagnosis, Holden describes himself as being dyslexic and autistic. For more than 28 years, Holden has maintained a daily record of weather and other information on illustrated paper scrolls, which are more than 82 feet long. He collects animal skeletons, guns, rocks, and other items.

Holden has long held anti-establishment beliefs, and told The Seattle Times that "what life is all about, as far as I'm concerned, is having fun." He criticizes politicians for their perceived lack of care for skepticism and the scientific method, and has questioned certain aspects of climate change. Writing in The Seattle Times, John Ruch called him "one of those unique mavericks that the American West is so good at producing."

== Books ==
- Handbook of Unusual Natural Phenomena (1977). William R. Corliss, John C. Holden (illustrator).
- Ancient Man: A Handbook of Puzzling Artifacts (1978).
- Earth in Motion: The concept of Plate Tectonics (1978). R.V. Fodor and John C. Holden (illustrator). Morrow, 1st ed., New York, New York.
- Mysterious Universe: A Handbook of Astronomical Anomalies (1979). William R. Corliss, John C. Holden (illustrator)
- Unknown Earth: A Handbook of Geological Enigmas (1980). William R. Corliss and John C. Holden (illustrator).
- The Unfathomed Mind: A Handbook of Unusual Mental Phenomena (1982). William R. Corliss and John C. Holden (illustrator).
- Science Askew: A Light-hearted Look at the Scientific World (2001). Donald E. Simanek and John C. Holden, Institute Of Physics Conference Series
