= Louis Brandeis House =

Historic house in Massachusetts, United States

- U.S. National Register of Historic Places
- U.S. National Historic Landmark
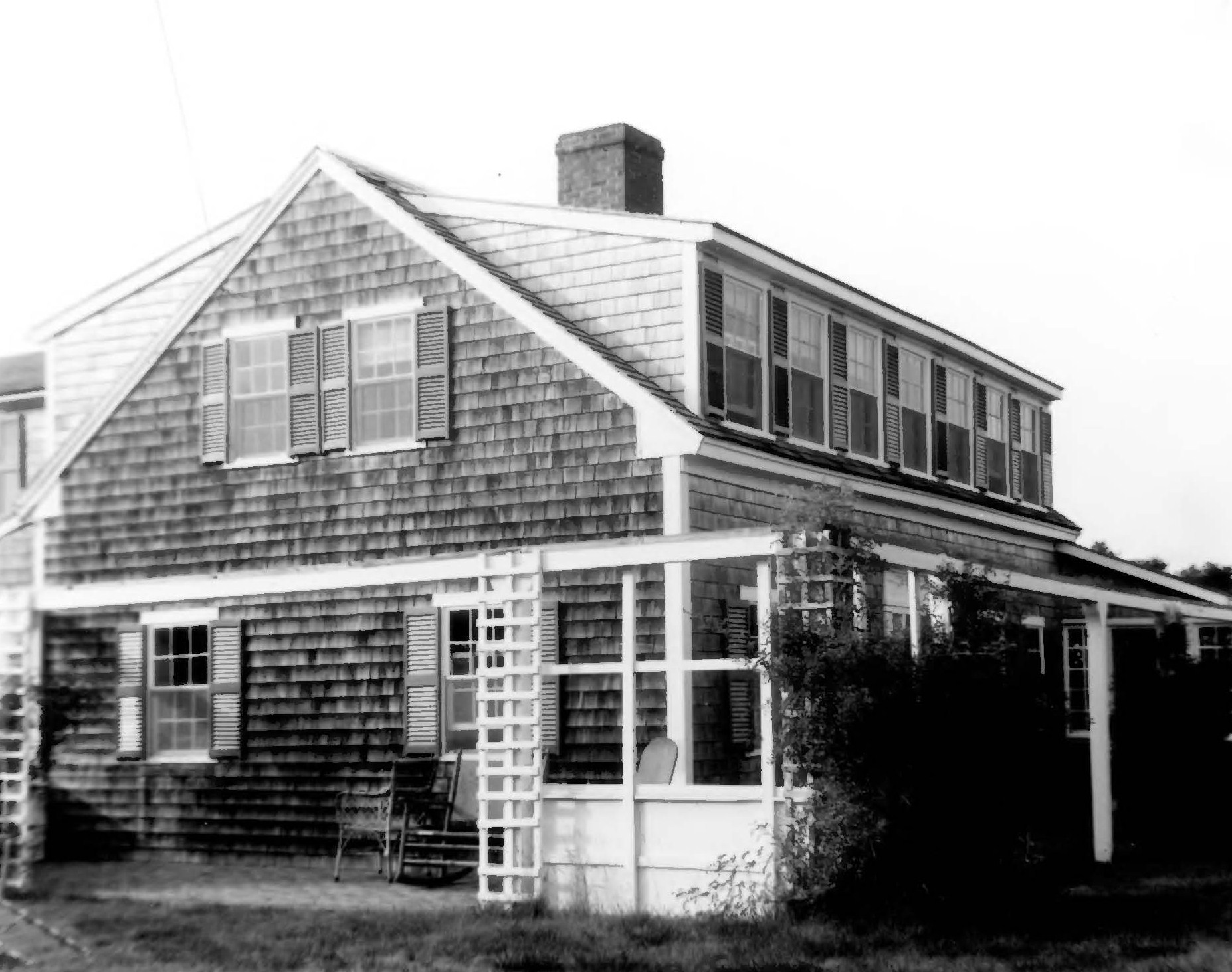
- Louis Brandeis House in 1972

- Location within Cape Cod Location within Massachusetts Location within the United States
- Location: Neck Lane, off Cedar St., 8 mi. SW of Stage Harbor Rd. intersection, Chatham, Massachusetts
- Coordinates: 41°40′23″N 69°59′0″W
- NRHP reference No.: 72000148

Significant dates
- Added to NRHP: November 28, 1972
- Designated NHL: November 28, 1972

The Louis Brandeis House is a National Historic Landmark on Judges Way, a private way off Stage Neck Road (off Cedar Street) in Chatham, Massachusetts. It stands on a neck of land near the Oyster Pond River. It received its landmark designation in 1972 as the principal summer residence of Louis Brandeis, an Associate Justice of the United States Supreme Court, who summered here from 1922 until his death in 1941.

The main block of the 1 1/2-story wood-frame house was probably built in the early decades of the 19th century, and exhibits typical vernacular Cape architecture. It has a five-bay facade, with a steeply pitched roof and a central chimney. Both slopes of the gable roof have shed dormers that run most of the house's length; these were probably added in the 20th century before the Brandeises bought the property. Two ells project from the rear of the house: a two-story kitchen and dormitory wing, and a single-story wing containing a maid's room, laundry, additional guest rooms, and a garage. A rustic cottage northwest of the main house provides additional sleeping quarters. The house's water was traditionally supplied by a windmill which was destroyed by a hurricane in 1944. A porch once extended across the front and side of the house, but this was removed later in the 20th century, replaced by a brick patio.

The interior of the house has seen a number of alterations, both during and after Brandeis' time. It has an early two-stage staircase between the front entry and the chimney, leading to a number of simple bedrooms on the second floor. To the right of the entry a door leads the main bedroom, and to the left is the living room. Both of these rooms have doorways to a narrow dining area at the back of the main block. Brandeis' study, a glassed-in space, lay just off the main bedroom off the north end of the porch.

Louis Brandeis was appointed to the Supreme Court in 1916 by President Woodrow Wilson. His nomination was controversial, in part because he was the first Jew appointed, and because of his socially liberal views. During his time on the court, the Brandeises lived in an apartment in Washington, D.C. They fell in love with the Chatham area on a visit to the Cape in 1922, and purchased this property. They returned here every summer. Brandeis would work on cases, spend time with his family, and entertain guests. He retired from the court in 1939, and died in Washington in 1941. At the time of its National Historic Landmark designation in 1972, the property remained in the hands of his descendants.

== See also ==
- List of National Historic Landmarks in Massachusetts
- National Register of Historic Places listings in Barnstable County, Massachusetts
