= Oyster Pond River =

Coordinates: 41°39′48.71″N 69°58′48.07″W

Location
- Country: United States
- States: Connecticut

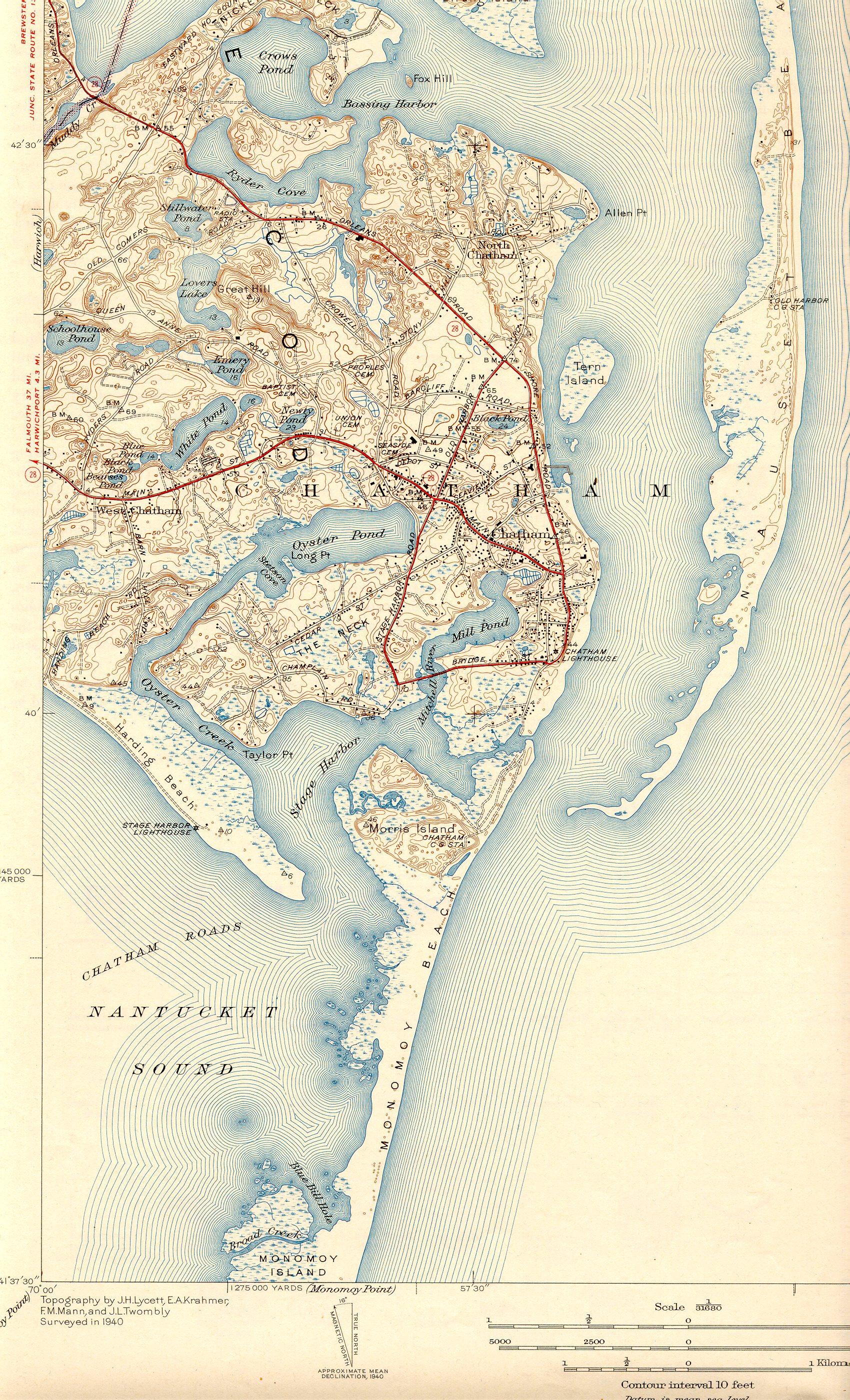
Oyster Pond River and environs

Oyster Pond River, also called Oyster Creek, is a 1.7-mile-long (2.7 km) river in Chatham, Massachusetts on Cape Cod.

The river is an estuary connecting Oyster Pond with Stage Harbor, averaging 3 to 5 feet (1 to 2 m) in depth and bordered with salt marshes.

== Oyster Pond ==
The Chatham Railroad Depot was built in 1896 when Chatham was the last town on Cape Cod to get railroad service. The direct rail access caused a tourist boom in Chatham. Many elegant summer homes were built near Oyster Pond. The Louis Brandeis House, one such summer home, is a National Historical Landmark.

Kenneth O. Emery (1914–1998) of Woods Hole Oceanographic Institution wrote a classic monograph on Oyster Pond entitled A Coastal Pond Studied by Oceanographic Methods, published by Elsevier in 1969. The monograph gives a detailed description of the pond in terms of topography, geology, hydrology, and biology. The pond lost all of its oysters in the late 1800s when the pond's entrance to Stage Harbor was filled in to make way for a railroad. In the late 1960s Oyster Pond was 25 hectares in area with an average depth of 3 meters and an average salinity of about 1.7 grams of salt per kilogram of pond water. Many studies of the pond have been made. The Oyster Pond Environmental Trust (OPET) was formed for the environmental preservation of Oyster Pond and its ecological systems.

In 1996, OPET reissued A Coastal Pond Studied by Oceanographic Methods with an epilogue by Dr. Brian Howes and Dr. Stanley Hart on how the pond had changed from the 1960s through to the mid 1990s. It also describes the management scheme put in place in the mid 1990s to control the salinity levels in the pond between 2- 4 ppt.

Over 200 species of birds utilize the marshes, forests, thickets, and open water surrounding Oyster Pond for breeding, migratory stops and over wintering.
