= Francis Parker Shepard =

American sedimentologist and marine geologist (1897–1985)

- Born: May 10, 1897
- Died: April 25, 1985 (aged 87)
- Education: Harvard University; University of Chicago
- Awards: Wollaston Medal (1966); Sorby Medal (1978)
- Scientific career
- Fields: Sedimentologist
- Workplaces: University of Illinois; Scripps Institution of Oceanography
- Doctoral students: Robert S. Dietz; Kenneth O. Emery; Douglas Inman

Francis Parker Shepard (10 May 1897 – 25 April 1985) was an American sedimentologist most associated with his studies of submarine canyons and seafloor currents around continental shelves and slopes.

== Early life and education ==
Shepard was born to a moderately wealthy family in Marbleheard, Massachusetts. He studied geology under R. A. Daly at Harvard University, a period that was interrupted by service in the US Navy during the First World War. After meeting his future wife, Elizabeth Buchner, he chose to study for his doctorate at the University of Chicago, close to her Milwaukee home. There he worked alongside J. Harlan Bretz, Rollin D. Salisbury and Rollin T. Chamberlin (son of Thomas Chamberlin) on the structural geology of the Rocky Mountains, receiving his degree in 1922.

== Career ==
After completing his degree, he became a geology instructor at the University of Illinois in 1922. He was promoted to full professor there in 1939, before formally resigning his professorship in 1945, having moved with his family to California in February 1942.

A fortuitous spell using a yacht belonging to his father, the head of Shepard Steamship Company, turned Shepard in the direction of marine geology. Examining the distribution of sediments on the New England shelf, he found evidence of the role of sea level change in the evolution of shelves. After a sabbatical in 1933–1934 spent studying submarine canyons off the coast of California, Shepard in 1937 took another leave (lasting for a year and a half) from the University of Illinois and moved his family and two of his graduate students, Robert S. Dietz and Kenneth O. Emery, to Scripps Institution of Oceanography in La Jolla. There his work focused on the shelves off California and the Gulf of California, and the processes that shaped them. Submarine canyons, he suggested, were initially carved by rivers when sea levels were lower during the recent Pleistocene epoch.

In the Second World War, Shepard again worked for the US Navy, where his expertise and knowledge of seafloors was used to assist submarine operations. In 1945 he became a professor of submarine geology at the Scripps Institute, working there until retiring from teaching in 1966. During this period, Shepard became director of an American Petroleum Institute project, studying sedimentation in the northern Gulf of Mexico between 1951 and 1960 (API Project 51). Although officially retiring in 1966, Shepard continued to work, even after illness had forced him to remain at home.

== Awards and honours ==
During his career Shepard received both the Wollaston Medal from the Geological Society of London (1966) and the Sorby Medal from the International Association of Sedimentologists (1978). Since 1967, the Society for Sedimentary Geology have awarded the Francis P. Shepard Medal for Marine Geology for in recognition of "Excellence in Marine Geology".
