= Robert S. Dietz =

American geophysicist and oceanographer (1914–1995)

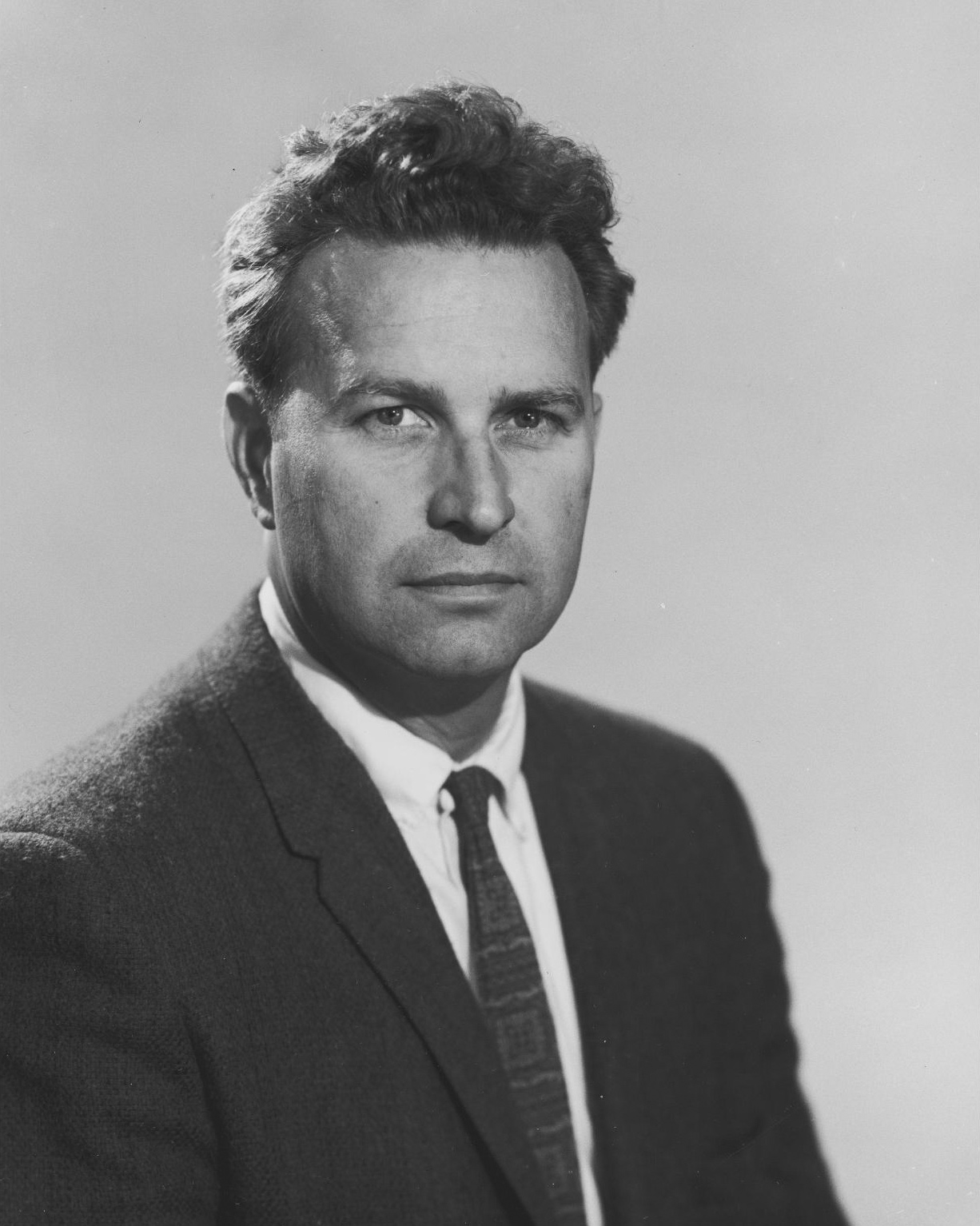
- Robert S. Dietz (1961)
- Born: Robert Sinclair Dietz; September 14, 1914; Westfield, New Jersey, United States
- Died: May 19, 1995 (aged 80); Tempe, Arizona, United States
- Education: Westfield High School
- Occupations: geophysicist and oceanographer
- Known for: research in seafloor spreading
- Notable work: first to recognize the Sudbury Basin as an ancient impact event
- Awards: Francis P. Shepard Medal (1979); Barringer Medal (1985)

Robert Sinclair Dietz (September 14, 1914 – May 19, 1995) was an American scientist with the United States Coast and Geodetic Survey. Dietz, born in Westfield, New Jersey, was a marine geologist, geophysicist and oceanographer who conducted pioneering research along with Harry Hammond Hess concerning seafloor spreading, published as early as 1960–1961. While at the Scripps Institution of Oceanography he observed the nature of the Emperor chain of seamounts that extended from the northwest end of the Hawaiian Island–Midway chain and speculated over lunch with Robert Fisher in 1953 that something must be carrying these old volcanic mountains northward like a conveyor belt.

== Early life and education ==
Born and raised in Westfield, New Jersey, Dietz graduated in 1932 from Westfield High School.

== Career ==
In later work he became interested in meteorite impacts, was the first to recognize the Sudbury Basin as an ancient impact event, and discovered a number of other impact craters. He championed the use of shatter cones as evidence for ancient impact structures. He received the Walter H. Bucher Medal from the American Geophysical Union in 1971, the Francis P. Shepard Medal for marine geology in 1979, the Barringer Medal from the Meteoritical Society in 1985 and the Penrose Medal from the Geological Society of America in 1988.

Dietz was an outspoken critic of creationism, and was the faculty advisor of two student groups at Arizona State University in 1985, Americans Promoting Evolution Science (APES) and the Phoenix Skeptics. Dietz spoke on evolution and creationism at meetings of these groups, The 6 February, 1982 Arizona Republic states Dietz agreed to a written debate with Dr. Brown. The Arizona Republic had a major article about the written debate agreement. (See “Debate Recalls ‘Monkey Trial’,” 6 February 1982, page F1). One sentence in that article read, “Each promised to present only scientific evidence for evolution or creation, and to avoid religious issues.” Over the next several weeks the two men communicated several times by phone and easily formulated the agreement without bickering or rancor. Months later, Dietz called Walt Brown and the assistant editor (who had agreed to be the debate’s editor) and formally backed out. Dietz said he had tried writing his side of the debate but found he couldn’t avoid religion. The editor (who was an evolutionist) went to Dietz’s office and tried to get Dietz to stay in the debate. Dietz would not. Oddly enough, three years later, Dr. Brown moved from Chicago to Phoenix where he and Dietz had dozens of meetings and became friends. Dietz did debate Christian apologist William Lane Craig at Arizona State University.

== Death ==
Dietz died in Tempe, Arizona.

Minor planet 4666 Dietz is named in his honor.

== Robert S. Dietz lectures ==
The ASU School of Earth and Space Exploration sponsors annual Robert S. Dietz Memorial Public Lectures, which have been given by:

- 2006 National Center for Science Education Executive Director Eugenie Scott
- 2007 NASA Astronaut John M. Grumsfeld
- 2011 John Grotzinger, Caltech

== Selected publications ==
- Dietz, Robert S. (1994). "Earth, Sea, and Sky: Life and Times of a Journeyman Geologist". Annual Review of Earth and Planetary Sciences. 22: 1–32. Bibcode:1994AREPS..22....1D. doi:10.1146/annurev.ea.22.050194.000245.
- Dietz, Robert S.; John C. Holden (scientific illustrator) (1987). Creation/Evolution Satiricon: Creationism Bashed. Winthrop, WA: Bookmaker.
- Dietz, Robert S. (November–December 1983). "In Defense of Drift". The Sciences. 23 (6): 26. doi:10.1002/j.2326-1951.1983.tb02661.x.
- Dietz, Robert S. (1964). Sudbury Structure as an Astrobleme. University of Chicago.
- Dietz, Robert S. (June 3, 1961). "Continent and Ocean Basin Evolution by Spreading of the Sea Floor". Nature. 190 (4779): 854–857. Bibcode:1961Natur.190..854D. doi:10.1038/190854a0. S2CID 4288496.
- Dietz, Robert S. (1954). "Marine geology of northwestern Pacific: description of Japanese bathymetric chart 6901". Bull. Geol. Soc. Am. 65 (12): 1199. Bibcode:1954GSAB...65.1199D. doi:10.1130/0016-7606(1954)65[1199:MGONPD]2.0.CO;2. ISSN 0016-7606.
- Menard, Henry W.; Dietz, Robert S. (May 1952). "Mendocino submarine escarpment". Journal of Geology. 60 (3): 266–278. Bibcode:1952JG.....60..266M. doi:10.1086/625962. JSTOR 30058194. S2CID 128459599.

== Bibliography ==
- "Dietz, Robert Sinclair". McGraw-Hill Modern Scientists and Engineers. Vol. 1. 1980. pp. 290–291.
