= ABU events =

Musical events organised by the Asia-Pacific Broadcasting Union

The ABU events are a series of music and dance events organised by the Asia-Pacific Broadcasting Union (ABU), including the ABU Radio Song Festival, ABU Song Festival, and ABU International Dance Festival. The events comprise both competitive and non-competitive formats produced for radio and television.

Participating broadcasters with full or additional full ABU membership may select representatives. The ABU Radio Song Festival began as a competition, with a panel of judges selecting the prize winners, before transitioning to a non-competitive format. The ABU Song Festival is a non-competitive musical gala recorded for transmission by participating broadcasters, while the ABU International Dance Festival is organised as a dance competition.

== History ==
=== Our Sound - The Asia-Pacific Song Contest ===
The logo of the previously named "Our Sound - The Asia-Pacific Song Contest"

In 2008, the European Broadcasting Union (EBU) proposed a partnership with ABU on the establishment of an Asiavision Song Contest, however, these talks did not produce any result, and in September 2008 it was announced that the Eurovision Song Contest format for Asian production had been sold to a private company from Singapore, Asiavision Pte. Ltd. The original name intended for that event was Asiavision Song Contest, but it was later changed to Our Sound - The Asia-Pacific Song Contest following a request from the ABU, who uses the Asiavision name for their news exchange service.

Initially, the contest (which was supposed to be a two programme live broadcast TV show with public voting) was set to premiere in 2009, but it was later rescheduled for March 2010 in Macau and then for November 2010 in Mumbai, at the end being postponed indefinitely "due to the ongoing issues between the organizers and EBU". First edition of a competition for Asian countries was held by EBU on 14 November 2026, which was not affiliated in any way to the ABU.

=== Development ===
The Asia-Pacific Broadcasting Union (ABU) had already run an international song contest for its members inspired by the Eurovision Song Contest from 1985 to 1987, called the ABU Popular Song Contest, with 14 countries of the Asia-Pacific region competing. The show had a similar concept to the current radio song festival with winners being chosen by a professional jury. South Korea, New Zealand and Australia celebrated victories in this competition. Later, from 1989 to 1991, ABU co-produced the ABU Golden Kite World Song Festival in Malaysia with the participation of Asia-Pacific countries, as well as Yugoslavia and Finland.

Shortly before launching the ABU Song Festival, the ABU had been considering the possibility to organize the ABU ASEAN TV Song Festival in Thailand. Historically, ASEAN song contests had been organized in periods between 1981 and 1997, however, since 2011 the ASEAN Festival had been organized between local radio stations as Bintang Radio ASEAN. The ABU outlined a plan about a "television song festival" based on the style of the Eurovision Song Contest following the cancellation of Our Sound. Kenny Kihyung Bae, chosen as the project manager, attended Eurovision Song Contest 2012 in Baku, Azerbaijan to learn more about the contest before putting it to work.

In November 2011, the ABU announced that they would organize its own TV and Radio Song Festivals to take place in Seoul, the South Korean capital, in time with 49th General Assembly in October 2012. The name Asiavision Song Contest was initially mentioned as a possibility, but they were later officially titled ABU TV Song Festival and ABU Radio Song Festival. According to the ABU, the deadline for participation applications for ABU TV Song Festival 2012 was 18 May 2012.

== Format ==
Andreas Gerlach, CEO of Asiavision Pte. Ltd, stated that "the format is highly suited to the Asia region and its people who love popular music and have a strong national pride. Asia today is all about competition, economically and politically. The Song Contest is a friendly competition between cultures. Like in Europe, the universal language of music will help to bring people closer together and nurture mutual understanding in the region."

The festivals are divided into two versions, ABU Radio Song Festival and ABU TV Song Festival. Twenty-six songs from sixteen nations competed at the Radio Song Festival, held in the South Korean capital, Seoul on 14 October 2012, while seven nations competed in the ABU TV Song Festival. Countries eligible to participate in both of the ABU Song Festivals must have full or additional full ABU or ASBU membership.

== ABU Radio Song Festival ==
The ABU Radio Song Festival is a concert performance for musicians, who are not under contract with any label. The ABU recommends its members to introduce participating musicians and their songs on radio. Every participant is chosen by one national radio broadcaster. A jury represented by ABU members chooses 15 finalists from 26 submissions. The finalists perform during the general assembly of the ABU. Another jury awards the best artists.

Year	Date	Host country	Host city	Venue	Participants
2012	11 October 2012	South Korea	Seoul	KBS Hall	14
2014	23 May 2014	Sri Lanka	Colombo	Stein Studios	12
2015	29 May 2015	Myanmar	Yangon	National Theatre of Yangon	10
2016	26 April 2016	China	Beijing	China National Radio Auditorium	14
2017	Not held				
2018	11 July 2018	Kazakhstan	Astana	Kazmedia Centre	10
2019	31 October 2019	Bangladesh	Dhaka	Hotel Intercontinental	8

- Note 1: Due to the death of King Bhumibol Adulyadej, the 2017 ABU Radio Song Festival, initially scheduled to be held on 27 April 2017 as part of the 2017 RadioAsia Conference, was cancelled

== ABU TV Song Festival ==
The ABU TV Song Festival is a concert performance for professional musicians, who according to the organiser are well known in their country of origin. The event is not meant to be competitive. The festival will be recorded and is meant to be broadcast by participating ABU members first. Non-participating ABU members and non-ABU member broadcasters will be allowed to broadcast the festival for a fee at a later stage. Every musician will be selected by a national broadcaster being member of the ABU. The participants perform during the general assembly of the ABU.

At a press conference held on 18 July 2013 it was announced that Indonesia were submitting a bid to host the ABU TV Song Festival 2015. In recent editions, the TV Festival has been held in the host city of the ABU General Assembly, with Istanbul, Turkey being the host to such assembly in 2015. If the bid were to be successful it would be the first time that the TV Festival would have been taken place away from the host country of the General Assembly.

However, it was announced in August 2014 that Indonesia were making plans to host the ABU TV Song Festival 2016 instead. Turkey's début at the 2014 Festival had led to speculation that they were hosting the 2015 festival alongside the ABU General Assembly, which took place in Istanbul. It was further confirmed in October 2014 that Turkey were indeed the hosts of the 2015 festival, which took place in Istanbul on 28 October 2015. Indonesia's hosting of the festival took place on 22 October 2016 in Bali.

Year	Date	Host country	Host city	Venue	Participants
2012	14 October 2012	South Korea	Seoul	KBS Hall	11
2013	26 October 2013	Vietnam	Hanoi	Hanoi Opera House	15
2014	25 October 2014	Macau	Macau	Sands Theatre	12
2015	28 October 2015	Turkey	Istanbul	Istanbul Congress Center	12
2016	22 October 2016	Indonesia	South Kuta, Bali	Bali Nusa Dua Convention Centre	12
2017	1 November 2017	China	Chengdu	S1 SRT Studio	14
2018	2 October 2018	Turkmenistan	Ashgabat	Ashgabat Olympic Stadium	16
2019	19 November 2019	Japan	Shibuya, Tokyo	NHK Hall	11
2020	14 December 2020	Malaysia	Kuala Lumpur (Note: held online with pre-recorded performances)	Maverick Pulse Studio	14
2021	18 November 2021	Malaysia	Kuala Lumpur	Maverick Pulse Studio	10
2022	27 November 2022	India	New Delhi	Siri Fort Auditorium	9
2023	29 October 2023	South Korea	Seoul	KBS Hall	11
2024	20 October 2024	Turkey	Istanbul	Istanbul Lütfi Kırdar International Convention and Exhibition Center	11

== ABU International Dance Festival ==
The ABU International Dance Festival will be a new event organised by the Asia-Pacific Broadcasting Union, with the début festival scheduled to take place in Hyderabad, India. The date was originally scheduled to take place in November 2016, But was later postponed and took place on 12 to 15 January 2017. The festival was proposed by Prasar Bharati to be a contest.

Year	Date	Host country	Host city	Venue	Participants
2017	15 January 2017	India	Hyderabad	Shilpakala Vedika	17
2019	9 March 2019	India	New Delhi	Hotel Taj Palace	16

== ABU Song Contest ==
The ABU Song Contest is a competitive televised song contest that was first discussed in 2015 by the ABU, with the first contest having been planned to be held in 2017, which however did not take place that year. In August 2018, it was announced that the ABU has been in discussion with the Chinese national broadcaster to host the first edition. The host city would be Qingdao. The contest was originally due to be held from 17 to 19 October 2019 but was delayed to 16–18 April 2020 to allow for more time to prepare the contest. After China implementing entry ban of other countries during the COVID-19 pandemic on 28 March 2020, ABU is yet to announce the fate of the contest.

Year	Date	Host country	Host city	Venue	Participants
2020	16–18 April 2020 (cancelled)	China	Qingdao	West Coast Star Island	Unknown
