= ABU Song Contest 2020 =

Cancelled international song competition

Dates and venue
- Semi-final: 16 April 2020 (cancelled)
- Final: 18 April 2020 (cancelled)
- Venue: West Coast Star Island, Qingdao, China

Organisation
- Executive supervisor: Koichi Okumura

Production
- Host broadcaster: Shandong Television
- Executive producer: Li Ming
- Presenters: TBD

Participants
- Number of entries: 5 (to date)
- Debuting countries: Brunei; China; Indonesia; Vanuatu; Vietnam

Vote
- Voting system: TBD

The ABU Song Contest 2020 was set to be the inaugural edition of the ABU Song Contest, to be held in Qingdao, China. The contest was due to consist of a semi-final on 16 April 2020 and a final on 18 April 2020. It was expected to become the first ever televised and big-scale music competition across the Asia-Pacific region and beyond since the ABU Golden Kite World Song Festivals which were held between 1989 and 1991. The fate of the contest remains unclear.

== Development ==
The 2020 contest was set to take place in Qingdao, China. The nation had previously hosted the ABU Radio Song Festival 2016 in Beijing and the ABU TV Song Festival 2017 in Chengdu, Sichuan.

In 2015, China's Hunan Television raised the prospect of co-organising a competitive song contest similar to the Eurovision Song Contest with the ABU during the organisation's general assembly in Istanbul, Turkey. Notably, Hunan Television had also been the official broadcaster for Eurovision in China from 2015 to 2018. The initial working title of the project was named as the "ABU TV Cup Song Contest" and it was expected to debut in 2017.

However, the contest was not held in 2017. After two years of continuous efforts, the ABU received the full backing of the National Radio and Television Administration of China and Qingdao Municipal Bureau of Culture, Radio, Television, Press and Publication to launch the contest in October 2019. In April 2018, the ABU also sent a delegation of executives, including the contest's Executive Supervisor Koichi Okumura, to Qingdao to discuss and observe the preparation of the contest along with the local government. The official announcement was eventually made to all members of the ABU during the organisation's 55th general assembly in Ashgabat, Turkmenistan.

In January 2019, the ABU announced Qingdao as the host city, with West Coast Star Island as the selected venue for the 2019 contest. Between 17 and 20 May 2019, Javad Mottaghi, the Acting Secretary-General of the ABU, visited Qingdao for observing the preparation of the contest which the trip was also accompanied by the Deputy Director General of the NRTA. He along with the ABU team was briefed by Li Ming, the Head of the host organizing committee for the ABU Song Contest about the details in relation to the venues, rules and regulations as well as other key components critical to the success of the event. He also paid the first-hand visit to the planned venues and sites. While the ABU's trip in Qingdao was on-going, the contest's Executive Supervisor Koichi Okumura was unable to attend the above meetings due to his presence in Tel Aviv for witnessing the Eurovision Song Contest 2019 on the same days. In May 2019, Mottaghi continued his trip to Jinan, the provincial capital of Shandong, for discussing the contest further with the head of the province's radio and television administration. It was in this meeting confirmed that Shandong Television would join the co-production of the show.

=== Postponement ===
In July 2019, the contest was announced to have been delayed into 2020; consequently, the semi-final is scheduled for 16 April 2020 and the final for 18 April 2020. On 4 September 2019, the ABU has formally relaunched the call for participants in the edition of 2020 as well as a renewed press release towards illustrating a more concrete vision about the project. It has been confirmed for the first time that the target scale of the contest's audiences could be expected to reach 2 billion, which could potentially break the existing records of Eurovision Song Contest thus far. All in all, it has been officially confirmed by the ABU via the press release that ABU Song Contest is an "extremely important" project for the organisation's calendar which would be witnessed by the eyes of 2 billion audiences.

After China implemented an entry ban from other countries during the COVID-19 pandemic on 28 March 2020, the ABU is yet to announce the fate of the contest. As of June 29, 2021, the ABU was said to be monitoring the situation with regards to the feasibility of holding the contest in 2021.

== Format ==
=== Voting ===
In January 2019, the ABU revealed early details about how the voting system might be implemented within the ABU Song Contest. The contest would adopt a two-tier system of combining the voting results from the Audience Jury of each participating country and International Professional Jury. It is required that the representative broadcaster of each participating country forms a jury panel consists of 100 selected individuals at their own discretion. In terms of International Professional Jury, it has been confirmed that this panel would be situated at the front of the stage. The panel would score each performance as soon as it has ended. Both the results of Audience Jury and the International Professional Jury would weigh 50% in the overall result of the contest.

On 4 September 2019, the ABU released a revamped version of the possible voting format with limited details. Within this new proposal, International Professional Jury would still be sitting in presence at the live show in Qingdao. In addition to this judging group, there would be also a separate judging group formed by the media planners and personalities across all participating countries.

Besides the above two judging groups derived from the professionals, it is disclosed for the first time that the ABU is also exploring the technical possibility of implementing national audiences' voting mechanism through live streaming across different time zones on real-time television.

== Participation ==
Only ABU TV & Radio members in the Asia-Pacific regions were eligible to enter. Should there have been more than one organisation to join per country, the ABU would have used its sole discretion to make the final decision through negotiating with the relevant applicants. The ABU explicitly expressed it did not have a target number of participating countries for the contest, but was highly confident that there could be sufficient interest out there to warrant a semi-final to be held. The ABU also expected participating countries and their broadcasters to host televised national selections prior to 30 June 2019, which was the deadline set for the broadcasters to submit their formal entries to the ABU. The organisation also reasoned that the recommendation of such selection process could facilitate the need of introducing the contest to the broader viewers of the region leading up to the semi-final and final in October.

Prior to the contest's delay, it was announced that countries had to officially apply to participate before 31 March 2019, and that the final list of the participating countries would be announced in June 2019 by the ABU. However, in September 2019, the ABU made a new call for participants, without revealing a deadline. Five countries had confirmed their participation prior to the cancelation of the contest: Brunei, Indonesia, Vanuatu, Vietnam, and China, the latter of which would have been an automatic finalist.

== Other countries ==
=== ABU members ===
- Azerbaijan – Azerbaijani broadcaster İTV was formally invited to participate in the competition by Javad Mottaghi, the Secretary General of the ABU. According to news outlet Eurovoix World, İTV had previously considered participation in the contest. No official statements were released by the broadcaster.
- Kazakhstan – Kazakh broadcaster Khabar Agency was formally invited to participate in the contest by the ABU.
- Maldives – Despite having initially confirmed participation, it was later revealed that Television Maldives would not participate in the first edition of the contest, due to a lack of interest from singers and financial issues.
- Myanmar – In March 2019, the Burmese broadcaster MRTV confirmed that they would not take part in the contest due to an insufficient budget.
- Thailand – Several broadcasters were allegedly interested in taking part in the contest, representing Thailand, though no broadcasters in particular were identified.
- Turkey – The Turkish broadcaster TRT had expressed interest in participating in the contest, having already participated in the ABU TV Song Festival and hosting it in 2015.

== See also ==
- ABU TV Song Festival
- Asia-Pacific Broadcasting Union
