= ABU TV Song Festival 2021 =

Tenth annual edition

Dates
- Final: 18 November 2021

Host
- Presenter(s): Azura Zainal; Sharizan Borhan
- Host broadcaster: Radio Televisyen Malaysia (RTM)
- Website: www.abu.org.my/2021/11/01/abu-tv-song-festival-2021

Participants
- Number of entries: 10
- Returning countries: Kazakhstan
- Non-returning countries: China; Nepal; Turkmenistan; Uzbekistan; Vanuatu

The ABU TV Song Festival 2021 was the tenth annual edition of the ABU TV Song Festival.

== Event ==
The non-competitive music showcase event was hosted in Kuala Lumpur, Malaysia as part of the 58th General Assembly of the Asia-Pacific Broadcasting Union (ABU). The program, as well as the entire general assembly, was held virtually for the second year in a row due to the COVID-19 pandemic.

The show was presented in-studio by TV and radio host Azura Zainal and commercial voice-over artist and emcee Sharizan Borhan. Each participating performance was pre-recorded and aired during the live stream.

Kazakh singer Dimash Kudaibergen, who performed for Kazakhstan in the 2015 and 2019 editions made a special appearance. He performed a cover of Kōji Tamaki's 1989 song "Ikanaide" (Japanese: 行かないで). The pre-recorded performance, also produced for the Tokyo Jazz Festival, was aired between the entries from Japan and Kazakhstan, the second and third participating acts, respectively.

== List of participants ==
Ten countries were represented in the ABU Song Festival 2021, the lowest number of participants to date. China, Nepal, Turkmenistan, Uzbekistan, and Vanuatu did not return from last year's edition. Kazakhstan returned after a one-year hiatus.

Running Order	Country	Artist	Song	Language
1	South Korea	ITZY	"LOCO"	Korean
2	Japan	milet	"inside you"	Japanese, English
3	Kazakhstan	Amre	"Waves of Life"	Kazakh
4	India	Summersalt	"Public Address System of the Khasi people"	Khasi
5	Macau	Dr. Jen	"Say You Love Me"	English
6	Turkey	İlyas Yalçıntaş	"Come, My Sky"	Turkish
7	Indonesia	Denny & Nonoy with Mixline Band	"Sense of Nusantara"	English
8	Brunei	Suzan Maidin	"I’m A Woman"	Brunei Malay
9	Malaysia	Amir Jahari	"Ingga"	Malay
10	Vietnam	The Pentatonic	"White Snow And Red Azalea"	Vietnamese
