= ABU TV Song Festival 2016 =

Date and venue
- Final: 22 October 2016
- Venue: Bali Nusa Dua Convention Centre, Bali, Indonesia

Organisation
- Host broadcaster: Televisi Republik Indonesia (TVRI), Radio Republik Indonesia (RRI)

Participants
- Number of entries: 12
- Debuting countries: Tunisia
- Returning countries: China; Sri Lanka
- Non-returning countries: India; Malaysia; Turkey
- Participation map: Participating countries Countries that participated in the past but not in 2016

The ABU TV Song Festival 2016 was the fifth annual edition of the ABU TV Song Festivals. The event, which is non-competitive, took place in Bali Nusa Dua Convention Centre, Bali, Indonesia, on 22 October 2016. Fourteen countries have confirmed their participation. Tunisia made their debut at the festival, while China and Sri Lanka returned after a one-year absence and a two-year absence respectively. Myanmar and Vanuatu have both stated that they do not intend to make their debut at the festival. India, Malaysia, and Turkey have withdrawn from the contest.

== Location ==
On 24 March 2016, it was announced by the Asia-Pacific Broadcasting Union (ABU) that one of Indonesian island, Bali, had been chosen to host the fifth edition of the TV Song Festival on 22 October 2016.

=== Host broadcaster ===
The ABU announced on 24 March 2016 that the fifth edition of the TV Song Festival will be co-organised by Indonesian national broadcasters, Televisi Republik Indonesia (TVRI) and Radio Republik Indonesia (RRI). The host broadcaster RRI revealed the logo for the 2016 TV Song Festival on 17 May 2016.

== Format ==
The ABU TV Song Festival celebrates the popular music culture by showcasing high-profile musical acts from each of the participating ABU broadcasting members, in a non-competitive manner.

=== Action calendar ===
The ABU published an action calendar which details the organisational process for the ABU TV Song Festival 2016.

- March: Call for entries, participation form distributed.
- Mid-April: Application deadline.
- Mid-May: Registration deadline with payment to ABU.
- End-June: Participating ABU members confirm musical acts.
- August and September: Participating ABU members to submit materials, profiles and promotional videos.
- October: The 53rd ABU General Assembly in Bali, Indonesia.

== List of participants ==
Draw	Country	Artist	Song	Language
01	China	Mo Siman	"The Love from Heaven"	Mandarin
02	Vietnam	Nguyen Thi Pha Le	"Ao Em Lua La" (The Girl in Silk Shirt)	Vietnamese
03	Maldives	Laisa Junaid	"Magey Rah" (My Island)	Maldivian
04	Tunisia	Lotfi Bouchnek	"Mohammed"	English, Tunisian Arabic
05	Afghanistan	Seeta Qasemie	"Melody Of Love"	English, Afghan Pashto
06	Macau	Queena	"Aylan"	Mandarin
07	Kazakhstan	Ayree	"My Motherland"	Kazakh
08	Hong Kong	Kayee Tam	"Puppet"	Cantonese
09	Sri Lanka	Shehara Liyanage	"Something 'bout You and I"	English
10	Japan	Kyary Pamyu Pamyu	"Fashion Monster" - "Sai & Co"	Japanese
11	South Korea	Ailee	"Singing Got Better"	Korean
12	Indonesia	Novita Dewi	"Terbang"	Indonesian

== Other countries ==
- India – On 31 July 2016, it was announced by the Asia-Pacific Broadcasting Union (ABU) that India have withdrawn for the 2016 TV Song Festival.
- Malaysia – On 31 July 2016, it was announced by the Asia-Pacific Broadcasting Union (ABU) that Malaysia have withdrawn for the 2016 TV Song Festival.
- Mongolia – On 13 October 2016, the Mongolian National Broadcaster (MNB), announced that they had changed their mind about making a debut at the contest. MNB had initially selected Naran to represent them, but decided to decline participation for the second time.
- Myanmar – On 2 June 2016, the national broadcaster for Myanmar, Myanmar Radio and Television (MRTV), announced that they would not be making their debut at the 2016 TV Song Festival.
- Thailand – On 19 October 2016, the national broadcaster for Thailand, Thai Public Broadcasting Service (TPBS), announced that they had changed their mind about making a return to the contest. TPBS had initially selected Sincharoen Brothers Band with the song "Dao Laum Deuan" to represent them, but decided to decline participation.
- Turkey – On 31 July 2016, it was announced by the Asia-Pacific Broadcasting Union (ABU) that Turkey have withdrawn for the 2016 TV Song Festival.
- Vanuatu – On 1 May 2016, the national broadcaster for Vanuatu, Vanuatu Broadcasting and Television Corporation (VBTC), announced that they would not be making their debut at the 2016 TV Song Festival.
