= ABU TV Song Festival 2012 =

Song festival in Seoul, South Korea

- Beyond the Wave!

Date and venue
- Final: 14 October 2012
- Venue: KBS Concert Hall, Seoul, South Korea

Organisation
- Executive supervisor: Hanizah Hamzah
- Host broadcaster: Korean Broadcasting System (KBS)
- Presenters: Han Seok Joon; Jamaica dela Cruz

Participants
- Number of entries: 11
- Debuting countries: Afghanistan; Australia; China; Hong Kong; Indonesia; Japan; Malaysia; Singapore; South Korea; Sri Lanka; Vietnam
- Participation map: Participating countries

The ABU TV Song Festival 2012 was the first annual edition of the ABU TV Song Festivals. The festival, which was non-competitive, took place in the KBS Concert Hall, located in the South Korean capital of Seoul and coincided with the 49th general assembly of the Asia-Pacific Broadcasting Union (ABU). Eleven countries confirmed their participation in the first edition of the competition.

The Asia-Pacific Broadcasting Union (ABU) had previously run international contests, inspired by the Eurovision Song Contest, for their members during 1985 – 1987. The European Broadcasting Union had proposed a partnership with the ABU in 2008 to establish the Asiavision Song Contest, however these talks never produced any results. The ABU announced in 2011 that they would organise their own ABU Radio and TV Song Festivals.

The format used was different from that of the Eurovision Song Contest, as there were two festivals that took place. The ABU TV Song Festival was a non-competitive musical gala orientated, while the Radio Song Festival was competitive. The festival was not aired live by any of the competing broadcasters, but was scheduled to be broadcast between October and November 2012.

== History ==
The Asia-Pacific Broadcasting Union (ABU) had already run an international song contest for its members inspired by the Eurovision Song Contest in 1985 – 1987, called the ABU Popular Song Contest, with 14 countries of the Asia-Pacific region competing. The show had a similar concept to the current festivals with winners being chosen by a professional jury. South Korea, New Zealand and Australia celebrated victories in this competition. In 1989 – 1991 ABU co-produced the ABU Golden Kite World Song Festival in Malaysia with participation of Asia-Pacific countries, as well as Yugoslavia and Finland.

In 2008, the European Broadcasting Union (EBU) proposed a partnership with ABU on the establishment of an Asiavision Song Contest, however these talks didn't produce any result, and in September 2008 it was announced that the Eurovision Song Contest format for Asian production had been sold to a private company from Singapore, Asiavision Pte. Ltd. The original name intended for that event was Asiavision Song Contest, but it was later changed to Our Sound - The Asia-Pacific Song Contest following a request from the ABU, who uses the Asiavision name for their news exchange service. Initially, the contest (which was supposed to be a two program live broadcast TV show with public voting) was set to premiere in 2009, but it was later rescheduled for March 2010 in Macao and then for November 2010 in Mumbai, at the end being postponed indefinitely "due to the ongoing issues between the organizers and EBU".

Shortly before launching the ABU Song Festival, the ABU had been considering the possibility to organize the ABU ASEAN TV Song Festival in Thailand. Historically, ASEAN song contests had been organized in periods between 1981 and 1997, however since 2011 the ASEAN Festival had been organized between local Radio stations as Bintang Radio ASEAN.

In November 2011, the ABU announced that they would organize its own TV and Radio Song Festivals to take place in Seoul, the South Korean capital, in time with 49th General Assembly in October 2012. The name Asiavision Song Contest was initially mentioned as a possibility, but they were later officially titled ABU TV Song Festival and ABU Radio Song Festival. According to the ABU, the deadline for participation applications for ABU TV Song Festival was 18 May 2012.

== Location ==
Location of the host city in South Korea.

Seoul, officially the Seoul Special City, is the capital and largest metropolis of South Korea. A megacity with a population of over 10 million, it is the largest city proper in the OECD developed world. The Seoul National Capital Area is the world's second largest metropolitan area with over 25 million inhabitants, which includes the surrounding Incheon metropolis and Gyeonggi province. Almost a quarter of South Koreans live in Seoul, half of South Koreans live in the metropolitan area, along with over 275,000 international residents.

Located on the Han River, Seoul has been a major settlement for over 2,000 years, with its foundation dating back to 18 B.C. when Baekje, one of the Three Kingdoms of Korea, established its capital in what is now south-east Seoul. It continued as the capital of Korea during the Joseon Dynasty and the Korean Empire. The Seoul National Capital Area is home to four UNESCO World Heritage Sites: Changdeokgung, Hwaseong Fortress, Jongmyo Shrine and the Royal Tombs of the Joseon Dynasty.

=== National host broadcaster ===
Korean Broadcasting System (KBS) was the host broadcaster for the first edition of the annual TV Song Festival, which was staged in the KBS Concert Hall. The host broadcaster offered to cover costs for staging the show as well as the accommodation for the participants of ABU TV Song Festival.

== Format ==
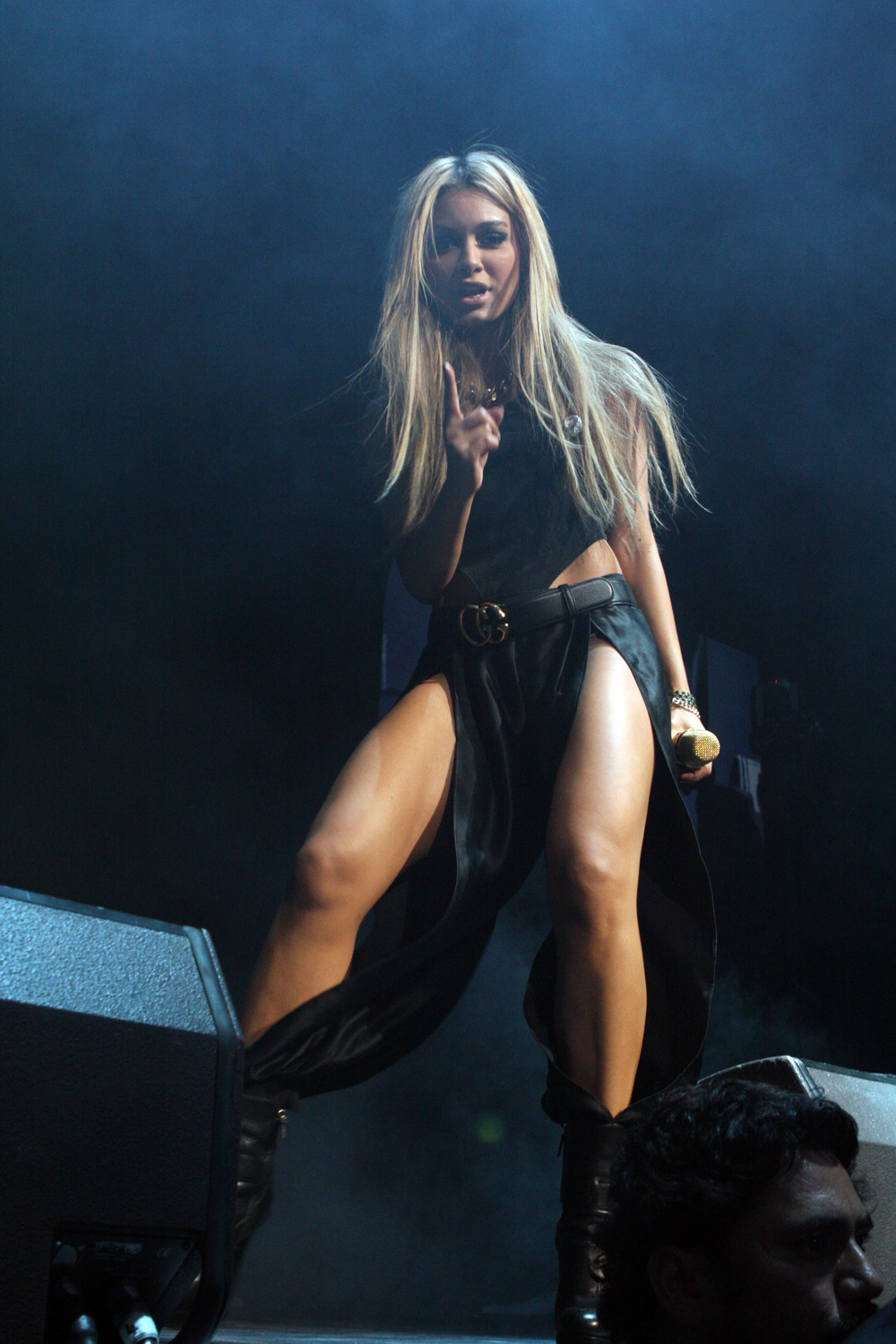
Havana Brown, participant from Australia

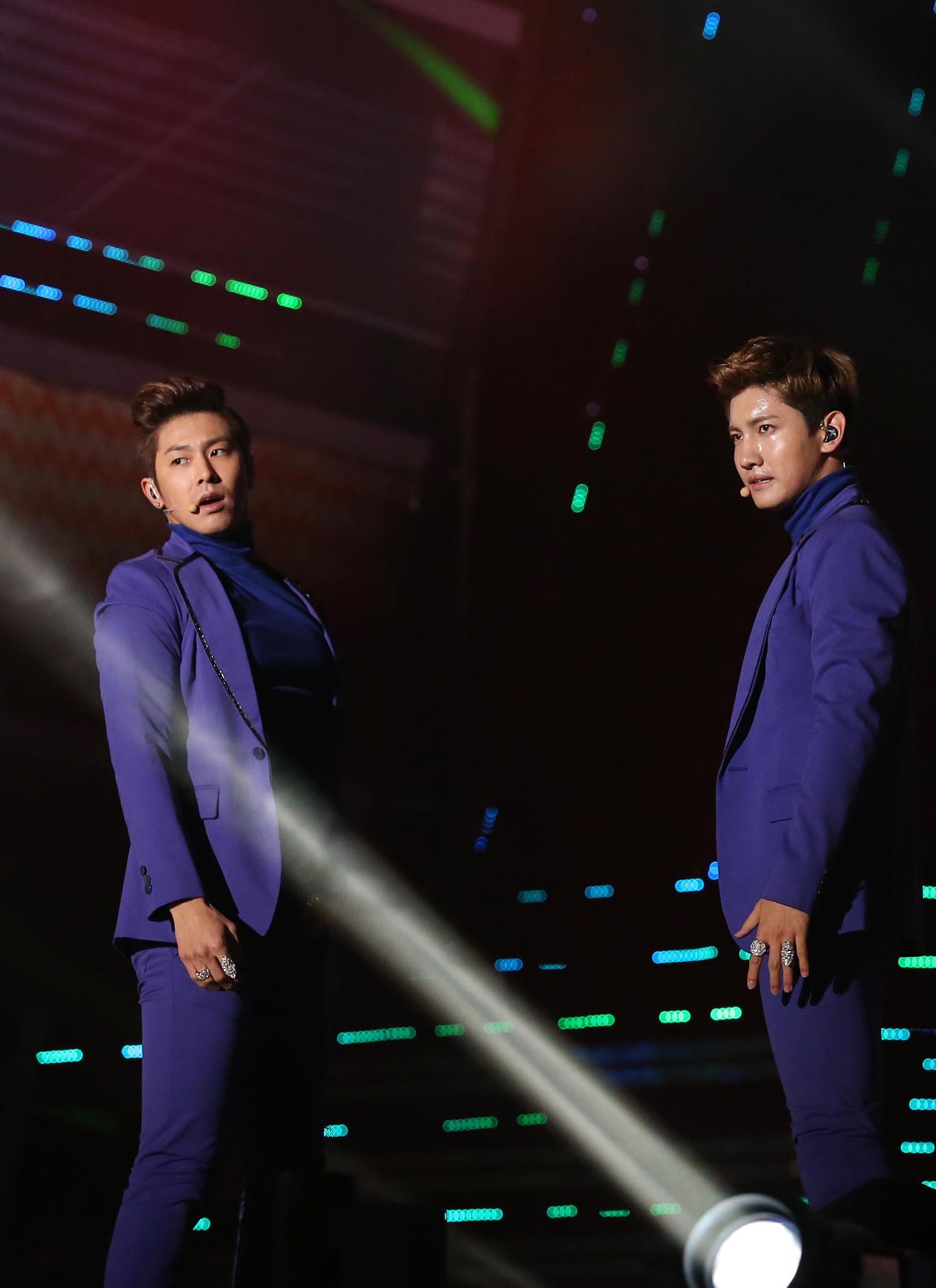
TVXQ, participant from South Korea

Unlike the format used in the Eurovision Song Contest there are two versions of the ABU Song Festival. The ABU Radio Song Festival 2012 and the ABU TV Song Festival 2012, which were both scheduled to take place between 11 and 17 October 2012 during the 49th ABU General Assembly. During the TV Festival, participants from eleven countries performed a song from their repertoire in a musical gala presentation. The theme for the festivals was 'Beyond the Wave', which has been inspired by the digital evolution changes in the global media.

== Participating countries ==
Eleven entries participated in the final of the ABU TV Song Festival (as shown in the table below). Mongolia had initially selected Naran with the song "Nudnii shil (Shades)", but subsequently withdrew their participation on 14 September 2012.

Draw	Country	Language	Artist	Song	English translation
01	Singapore	Malay	Taufik Batisah	"Usah Lepaskan"	Don't Let Go
02	Australia	English	Havana Brown	"We Run the Night"	—
03	Sri Lanka	Sinhalese	Arjuna Rookantha & Shanika Madhumali	"Me Jeewithe (මේජීවිතේ)"	This Life
04	Malaysia	Malay	Hafiz	"Awan Nano"	Nano-Clouds
05	Vietnam	Vietnamese	Lê Việt Anh	"Mây"	Cloud
06	Japan	Japanese, English	Perfume	"Spring of Life"	—
07	Hong Kong	Cantonese	Alfred Hui (許廷鏗)	"Ma Ngai "	The Ant
08	Indonesia	Indonesian	Maria Calista	"Karena Ku Sanggup"	Because I Can
09	China	Mandarin	Cao Fujia (曹芙嘉)	"Qian gua (牵挂)"	Don't Worry
10	Afghanistan	Persian^{1}	Hameed Sakhizada (حمید سخی زاده)	"Folk Music" (Malestani)	My Eye
11	South Korea	Korean, English	TVXQ (동방신기)	"Catch Me"	—

Notes

1. Specifically Hazaragi, a Persian dialect spoken in Hazarajat, in central Afghanistan.

== International broadcasts ==
Each participating country were invited to broadcast both events across their respective networks and provide commentary in the native languages to add insight and description to the shows. The festival was not broadcast live, although each broadcaster has stated that they would broadcast the festival between October and November 2012 with an estimated audience of 2 billion people, twenty times the audience that is reached by the Eurovision Song Contest which reaches an audience of approximately 100 million people.

- Afghanistan – Radio Television Afghanistan
- Australia – SBS One (28 October 2012) / SBS Two (1 November 2012)
- China – China Central Television
- Hong Kong – Television Broadcasts Limited (10 November 2012)
- Indonesia – Televisi Republik Indonesia (3 November 2012, on TVRI Nasional)
- Japan – Japanese Broadcasting Corporation
- Malaysia – Radio Televisyen Malaysia (4 January 2013)
- Singapore – MediaCorp Suria (November 2012)
- South Korea – KBS 1TV (21 October 2012)
- Sri Lanka – MTV Channel
- Vietnam – Vietnam Television

== See also ==
- ABU Song Festivals
- ABU Radio Song Festival 2012
- Asia-Pacific Broadcasting Union
- Eurovision Song Contest
- Eurovision Song Contest 2012
- Junior Eurovision Song Contest 2012
