= ABU TV Song Festival =

- Also known as: ABU Song Festival
- Genre: Song festival
- Created by: ABU
- No. of episodes: 14 festivals

Production
- Production company: Asia-Pacific Broadcasting Union

Original release
- Release: 14 October 2012 – present

The ABU Song Festival is an annual non-competitive gala that showcases songs or instrumentals by musicians across Asia, organised by the Asia-Pacific Broadcasting Union (ABU). Participating countries which have full or additional full ABU membership are invited to submit a song to be performed in front of a live audience. It is live recorded so each national broadcaster can add subtitles in their respective Asian languages. It is also envisioned as an annual international gala event, organized in coordination with ABU members.

In contrast to the Eurovision Song Contest in Europe, which has numerous rules and obligations as well as a voting system to determine a specific "winner", the television festival is a non-competitive, cordial musical gala presentation, with the intention to recognise the musical talent of Asian musicians across Asia. For the 2025 edition, it was rebranded as the ABU Song Festival.

== Development ==
The Asia-Pacific Broadcasting Union (ABU) had already run an international song contest for its members inspired by the Eurovision Song Contest between 1985 and 1987, called the ABU Popular Song Contest, with 14 countries of the Asia-Pacific region competing. The show had a similar concept to the current radio song festival with winners being chosen by a professional jury. South Korea, New Zealand and Australia celebrated victories in this competition. From 1989 to 1991, ABU co-produced the ABU Golden Kite World Song Festival in Malaysia with participation of Asia-Pacific countries, as well as Yugoslavia and Finland.

Shortly before launching the ABU Song Festival, the ABU had been considering the possibility to organize the ABU ASEAN TV Song Festival in Thailand. Historically, ASEAN song contests had been organized in periods between 1981 and 1997, however since 2011 the ASEAN Festival had been organized between local radio stations as Bintang Radio ASEAN. The ABU outlined a plan about a "television song festival" based on the style of the Eurovision Song Contest following the cancellation of Our Sound. Kenny Kihyung Bae, chosen to the project manager, attended Eurovision Song Contest 2012 in Baku, Azerbaijan to learn more about the contest before putting it to work.

2012 logo for ABU TV Song Festival

In November 2011, the ABU announced that they would organize its own TV and Radio Song Festivals to take place in Seoul, the South Korean capital, in time with 49th General Assembly in October 2012. The name Asiavision Song Contest was initially mentioned as a possibility, but they were later officially titled ABU TV Song Festival and ABU Radio Song Festival. According to the ABU, the deadline for participation applications for ABU TV Song Festival 2012 was 18 May 2012.

== Format ==
Participation since 2012: Entered at least once Never entered, although eligible to do so Entry intended, but later withdrew

The ABU TV Song Festival is a concert performance for professional musicians, who according to the organiser are well known in their country of origin. The event is not meant to be competitive. The festival will be recorded and is meant to be broadcast by participating ABU members first. Non-participating ABU members and non-ABU member broadcasters will be allowed to broadcast the festival for a fee at a later stage. Every musician will be selected by a national broadcaster being member of the ABU. The participants perform during the general assembly of the ABU.

At a press conference held on 18 July 2013 it was announced that Indonesia were submitting a bid to host the ABU TV Song Festival 2015. In recent editions, the TV Festival has been held in the host city of the ABU General Assembly, with Istanbul, Turkey playing host to such assembly in 2015. If the bid were to be successful it would be the first time that the TV Festival has taken place away from the host country of the General Assembly.

However, it was announced in August 2014 that Indonesia were making plans to host the ABU TV Song Festival 2016 instead. Turkey's debut at the 2014 Festival has led to speculation that they are hosting the 2015 alongside the ABU General Assembly which was scheduled to take place in Istanbul. It was further confirmed in October 2014 that Turkey was indeed the host of the 2015 festival, which took place in Istanbul in October 2015.

In December 2025, it was announced that the ABU TV Song Festival was rebranded as the ABU Song Festival. Additionally, the ABU's Programme Bureau members chose not to turn the event into a competitive song contest, which would have taken the place of the canceled ABU Song Contest.

== Participation ==
Participation in the contest is open to members of the Asia-Pacific Broadcasting Union.

Table key

Inactive – Countries that have participated in the past but are now inactive.

Country	Broadcaster(s)	Debut year	Most recent entry	Number of entries
Afghanistan	RTA; ATN	2012	2018	6
Australia	SBS; ABC	2012	2019	4
Benin	AUB; ORTB	2018^{[d]}	2018	1
Bhutan	BBS; Kuzoo FM	2025	2026	2
Brunei	RTB	2013	2021	4
China	CCTV; RTPRC; SRT; SMG	2012	2024	9
Hong Kong	TVB	2012	2025	11
India	PB/DD	2015	2026	11
Indonesia	LPP TVRI	2012	2024	12
Iran	IRIB; SMC	2013	2013	1
Japan	NHK	2012	2026	15
Kazakhstan	KMO; KA	2015	2022	7
Kyrgyzstan	KTRK; NBS	2013	2018	2
Macau	TDM	2014	2026	12
Malaysia	RTM	2012	2026	11
Maldives	TVM; PSM; IBC	2014	2022	6
Mongolia	MNB	2025	2025	1
Nepal	NTV; Radio Tulsipur	2020	2020	1
Russia	RTR	2018	2018	1
Singapore	Media TV; MediaCorp Suria	2012	2013	2
South Korea	KBS	2012	2026	15
Sri Lanka	SLRC; MTV; CMG	2012	2026	5
Thailand	NBT	2013	2014	2
Tunisia	AUB; ASBU; TT	2015^{[c]}, 2016^{[d]}	2016	1
Turkey	TRT	2014	2026	11
Turkmenistan	TVTM	2017	2026	7
Uzbekistan	MTRK	2018	2024	3
Vanuatu	VBTC	2020	2020	1
Vietnam	VTV	2012	2026	13
Zambia	AUB; ZNBC	2017^{[d]}	2017	1

== Hosting ==
Year	Date	Host city	Venue	Participants	Ref.
2012	14 October 2012	Seoul, South Korea	KBS Hall	11	
2013	26 October 2013	Hanoi, Vietnam	Hanoi Opera House	15	
2014	25 October 2014	Macau	Sands Theatre	12	
2015	28 October 2015	Istanbul, Turkey	Istanbul Congress Center	12	
2016	22 October 2016	Bali, Indonesia	Bali Nusa Dua Convention Centre	12	
2017	1 November 2017	Chengdu, China	S1 SRT Studio	14	
2018	2 October 2018	Ashgabat, Turkmenistan	Ashgabat Olympic Stadium	16	
2019	19 November 2019	Shibuya, Japan	NHK Hall	11	
2020	14 December 2020	N/A^{[e]}	Maverick Pulse Studio	14	
2021	18 November 2021	N/A^{[e]}	Maverick Pulse Studio	10	
2022	27 November 2022	New Delhi, India	Siri Fort Auditorium	9	
2023	29 October 2023	Seoul, South Korea	KBS Hall	11	
2024	20 October 2024	Istanbul, Turkey	Istanbul Lütfi Kırdar International Convention and Exhibition Center	10	
2025	13 September 2025	Ulaanbaatar, Mongolia	Mongolian State Academic Drama Theatre	9	
2026	2 November 2026	Colombo, Sri Lanka	Stein Studios	10	
2027		Shanghai, China			

== See also ==
- ABU Song Festivals
- ABU Radio Song Festival

== Notes and references ==
=== Notes ===
1. Mongolia had initially selected Naran with the song "Nudnii shil (Shades)", but subsequently withdrew their participation on 14 September 2012.
2. Mongolia had initially selected Sweetymotion after replacing the act for Naran, but subsequently withdrew their participation for a second time on 13 October 2016.
3. Tunisia had initially announced their debut at the ABU TV Song Festival 2015, but later withdrew prior to the festival taking place.
4. Invited as a guest member to the competition that year.
5. Held online with pre-recorded performances
