= ABU Song Festival 2025 =

Song festival in Ulaanbaatar, Mongolia

Date and venue
- Final: 13 September 2025
- Venue: National Academic Drama Theatre, Ulaanbaatar

Organisation
- Host broadcaster: MNB

Participants
- Number of entries: 9
- Debuting countries: Bhutan; Mongolia
- Non-returning countries: China; Indonesia; Turkmenistan; Uzbekistan

The ABU Song Festival 2025 was the fourteenth annual edition of the ABU Song Festival. The program was hosted in Mongolia with Mongolian State Academic Drama Theatre, Ulaanbaatar as its venue.

The Festival was held in Ulaanbaatar as a non-competitive celebration of popular music representing the geographical and cultural expanse of the Asia-Pacific region. At the heart of the Festival was a one and a half hour concert ("Festival Concert"). With the robust cooperation of ABU member organizations, the Festival showcased top solo or group talents hailing from an array of national music scenes.

== List of participants ==
Broadcasters from nine different countries participated in the ABU Song Festival 2025.

| Country | Broadcaster | Artist | Song | Language |
|---|---|---|---|---|
| Bhutan | BBS | Pema Samdrup | "The Song of Joy" | Dzongkha |
| Hong Kong | TVB | Huang Bo | "A Kind of Perseverance" | Cantonese |
| India | PB | Savani Ravindra Ghangurde | "Rang De" | Hindi |
| Japan | NHK | Ms.Ooja | "Be..." | Japanese |
| South Korea | KBS | Kwon Eun-bi | "Under Water" | Korean, English |
| Macau | TDM | Elisa Chan | "Eat or Sleep" | Cantonese |
| Malaysia | RTM | Nadeera | "Bukan lagi kita" | Malay |
| Mongolia | MNB | The Hu | "Wolf Totem" | Mongolian |
| Turkey | TRT | Orhan Çakmak | "Türkiyem" | Turkish |
