= Ngũ Cung =

Vietnamese progressive rock band

Ngũ Cung (The Pentatonic)
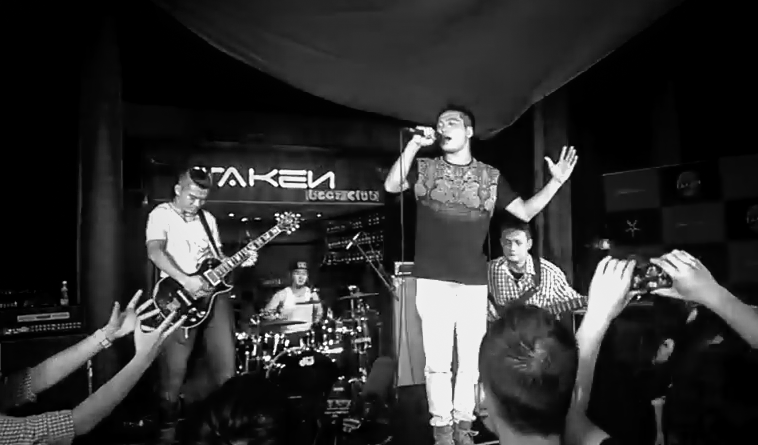
- Ngũ Cung performed in Hanoi, 2015

Background information
- Origin: Hanoi, Vietnam
- Genres: Progressive rock, hard rock
- Years active: 2007-present
- Members: Hoang Hiep; Tran Thang; Phonesay Alounsavath; Pham Nhat Minh
- Past members: Minh Duc; Duc Long; Hai Bang; An Chinh; Nguyen Hung Cuong; David Payne; Hai Dang; Tran Hoang Duc<
- Website: www.ngucung.com

Ngũ Cung (literally ngũ cung 5 tones, "pentatonic", or also known as 5C) is a Vietnamese progressive rock band formed in 2007. They were well known for their winning in the talent contest Rock Your Passion in 2007. After Rock Your Passion contest, Ngũ Cung also has become a phenomenon in Vietnam for their exceptional music which is a fusion of rock and traditional rhythm from the Northwest of Vietnam. In 2008, their song 'Cướp Vợ' won the Impressive Composition Prize at Bai Hat Viet Competition.

== Early years ==
Members of Ngũ Cung met each other by chance. Initially, drummer Hung Cuong and lead guitarist Tran Thang met at a guitar contest and they share the same passion for music and keen interest in Progressive Rock. Since then, they had nurtured a dream to form a professional band playing Prog in Vietnam. Hung Cuong persuaded Duc Long who was then keyboard player for Mắt Bão - Storm Eye). Minh Duc and Hoang Hai soon after joined the band. The band was officially established on 10 October 2007, shortly before the Rock Your Passion Contest.

Well known for being the winner at the Rock Your Passion Contest, Ngũ Cung soon became popular for their exceptional music. The band play rock with ethnic and classical music instruments, which is reflected perfectly in the songs: Cướp vợ (tục lệ người H'mông) - Wife kidnapping(traditional custom of Mong people), Nỗi đau - Pain, Nụ hôn trên đỉnh Phanxipăng - Kiss on Fansipan Mountain, Giã cốm đêm trăng - Pounding green rice flakes in the moonnight.

Ngũ Cung and the runner up at Rock Your Passion Unlimited were selected as the representatives of Vietnam to perform with alternative rock band My Chemical Romance in Tiger Unite 08.

=== Cướp Vợ (Tục lệ người H'mông) - Wife Kinapping (Traditional custom of Mong people) ===
This song is considered, thus far, the most successful song of Ngũ Cung as it expresses the band's characteristic. Cướp Vợ was composed by Tran Thang and his grandfather Tran Tuan Long. It was highly valued by senior artists both in Vietnam and abroad. The song was ranked in the Top 10 Vietnamese songs on the music channel XoneFM and also achieved the "Impressive Composition Prize" at the Bai Hat Viet Competition.

== Live performances ==
Since 2008, Ngũ Cung has actively participated in various music events in Vietnam, including:

- Rock Unite 2007 (Saigon) - performing with My Chemical Romance and the Unlimited from Saigon, Vietnam.
- C.A.M.A 2007, 2008, 2010 and 2011.
- VTV - Morning Star Rendez Vous 2008.
- I-Muzik 2008 - at My Dinh National Stadium.
- Rock Storm 2009, 2010, 2011 and 2012 - in Hanoi, Hai Phong, Da Nang, and Ho Chi Minh City attracting thousands of fans.
- Saigon Rock III Festival 2009 - in Ho Chi Minh City with the participance of 23 Rock bands nationwide with 8-hour consecutive of music performance.
- LET'S ROCK 2009 - in Hanoi with the famous alternative rock band from Denmark, the Blue Van.
- Rock through the night CLEAR MAN 2009 - at Quan Ngua Stadium, Hanoi.
- Tiger Translate 2010 - at Giang Vo Exhibition Center, Hanoi with Microwave and I am Giant from UK.
- Monsoon Music Festival 2014 - at Thang Long Citadel Square, Hanoi.
- Ancient Capital Fire Rock (Hue Festival 2016) - at Freedom Stadium, Hue.
- SeaPride Music Festival for LGBT 2016 - at American Club, Hanoi.
- VTV - Pride of Melody 2017.

With the aim to spread rock spirit to young people in Vietnam, especially students, Ngũ Cung has taken part in exchange activities and performed at a number of universities throughout the country, such as CKX at Hanoi Civil Engineering & Construction University, Orient University, Thang Long University or rock events of Thai Nguyen Rock Clubs.

=== Liveshow 'Cao Nguyen Da' ===
Convened the first time in 2014, Liveshow 'Cao Nguyen Da' has made Ngũ Cung one of a limited number of rock bands in Vietnam holding their own liveshow. The Liveshow in 2014 was held at Giang Vo Exhibition Center, Hanoi under the sponsorship of Mr. Nguyen Hai Duong, owner of M2 fashion shops chain. It attracted more than 10,000 people including fans, guest bands and senior artists. Named under a famous scenery in the mountainous area in the Northwest of Vietnam, Ha Giang, the liveshow depicted the resilience of people living in an inhabited area and surrounded by majestic natural beauty of Ma Pi Leng Pass and Nho Que River. It can said that Liveshow Cao Nguyen Da has brought the name of Ngũ Cung to a higher level in the music industry in Vietnam.

== Discography ==
The discography of Ngũ Cung consists of two studio albums: "365000" and "Cao Nguyen Da".

=== 365000 (2009) ===
Album 365000 Ngũ Cung

365000 is the first album, which was released free for fans in July 2009. The album was made with the cooperation of the Five supply and Honda Vietnam.

The band partnered with Riki, Tran Thanh Phuong and Tran Tuan Long during the recording. They sang the English song 'East' with American singer Riki. The song has style of music in West Asia that is the first sung by Riki and then by the Hoang Hiep. Ngũ Cung also wrote song Lồng ngực tối - Dark chest with Nguyen Vinh Tien, a ballad song. BeU (Vietnamese version), the song they cooperate with Honda Vietnam, was included in this album as well.

365,000 - theme song and also the name of the album, composed for the purpose of celebrating 1,000 years of Thang Long Hanoi.

=== Album Cao Nguyen Da (2014) ===
The release of this album was accompanied by the live show with the same name. It consists of 10 songs with the theme of mountainous area and cultures of the Northwest and Northeast in Vietnam. The beauty of nature and colorful life of the indigenous once again inspired Ngũ Cung's compositions.

== Members ==
=== Current ===
- Do Hoang Hiep (lead vocals) (2007–present)
- Tran Thang (guitar, backing vocals) (2007–present)
- Phonesay Alounsavath (Bass, acoustic guitars) (2017–present)
- Phạm Nhat Minh (Drums) (2017–present)
- Nguyen Van Tuan (Bass, acoustic guitars) (2014–present)

=== Former ===
- Nguyen Hung Cuong (Drums) (2007–2009) (2010–2015)
- Hoang Hai Bang (bassist) (2009–2011)
- Nguyen Minh Duc (guitar, bass) (2007–2009)
- Nguyen Duc Long (keyboard) (2007–2010)
- Truong An Chinh (drums) (2009–2012)
- Nguyen Hai Dang (Bass) (2010–2012)
- David Payne (Bass) (2012–2015)
- Tran Hoang Duc (Drums) (2015–2017)

=== Manager ===
- Bui Thanh Ha (Harry Bui)

== Scandal ==
The scandal of plagiarism in 2010 was seen as a low point for Ngũ Cung. After releasing album 365000, some websites posted articles stating that some songs on "365000" have similar melodies to foreign songs, especially the song Lồng ngực tối - Dark chest. However, the band denied the rumor and extended an apology to fans for the scandal.

Awards and achievements
Preceded by Lê Việt Anh with "Mây"	Vietnam in the ABU TV Song Festival; 2013 with "Cao nguyên đá" and Văn Mai Hương with "Là anh đó"	Succeeded by
