= ABU International Dance Festival 2017 =

Dates
- Final: 15 January 2017

Host
- Venue: Shilpakala Vedika, Hyderabad, India
- Presenter(s): Adity Nagori
- Host broadcaster: Prasar Bharati (PB)
- Website: www.abu.org.my/Festivals-@-Dance_Festival.aspx

Participants
- Number of entries: 17 participants; 13 countries
- Debuting countries: See participating countries below
- Participation map: Participating countries Countries which have provisionally confirmed their participation in 2017

The ABU International Dance Festival 2017 was the inaugural ABU International Dance Festival, which took place in Shilpakala Vedika, in Hyderabad, India on 15 January 2017.

Indian national broadcasters Doordarshan (DD) and All India Radio (AIR), which are part of the public broadcasting agency Prasar Bharati (PB), will be in charge of organising the event. The festival was originally scheduled to take place in New Delhi in November 2016, but was later moved to a new host city and the festival dates subsequently changed. The competition is for amateur dancers between the ages of 18 and 25, who will perform two dance routines. As this is the inaugural festival, all participating countries will be making their debut. Seventeen acts from thirteen countries have confirmed their participation.

== Location ==
Location of the host city in Hyderabad.

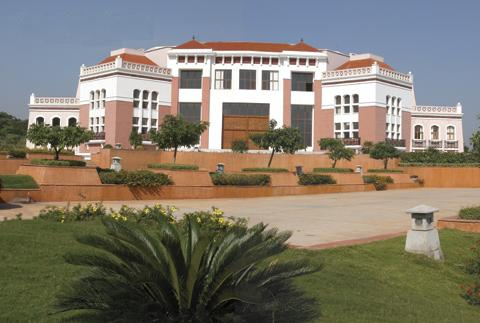
Shilpakala Vedika, venue for the competition.

On 8 June 2016, it was announced that the inaugural ABU International Dance Festival will take place in Hyderabad, India. The festival was originally going to be held in New Delhi, but was later changed to a new host city and the festival dates subsequently changed. India was chosen by the ABU to host the first edition, as the nation has a history of cultural dance. India has several festivals with a dance and cultural background, and so the ABU selected the country to host so that they could showcase their expertise and achieve the goals of the festival organisation.

== Format ==
The ABU International Dance Festival will be the inaugural International Dance Festival, organised by the Asia-Pacific Broadcasting Union (ABU) and the Indian national broadcasters Doordarshan (DD) and All India Radio (AIR), which are part of the public broadcasting agency Prasar Bharati (PB). The festival is scheduled to take place on 15 January 2017. The rules of the festival state that all dance routines must last no longer than eight minutes, and may consist of 2 to 8 people in the routine. All dancers must be between the ages of 18 and 25.

Originally the festival was going to be open to all styles of dance including classical and street. However, upon the changes to the format, all participating country are now allowed to submit two dances, one traditional which will be non-competitive, and one contemporary which will be the competitive routine. Registration for countries wishing to participate in the festival began on 31 May 2016 and was scheduled to conclude on 25 June 2016. However, the deadline has been extended to 15 July 2016. On 14 January 2017 it was announced that choreographer, Adity Nagori would be the host for the first edition of the dance festival.

== Participating countries ==
The following list of countries have confirmed participation. Turkmenistan had appeared on the original participating list, but subsequently disappeared upon publication of the second list, with no reasons for their removal.

Country	Participant(s)	Performance	Dance style	Choreographer
Afghanistan	Pashtun ethnic people		Traditional	
Azerbaijan	Uzundara		Traditional	
Fiji	Meke		Traditional	
India	Chaitanaya		Contemporary	
India	Andaz-e-Raqs		Traditional	
Indonesia	Eksotika Karmawibhangga Indonesia (EKI Dance Group)	"Bala Turangga"	Traditional	
Indonesia	Eksotika Karmawibhangga Indonesia (EKI Dance Group)	"Kabaret Baliano"	Contemporary	
Indonesia	Tari Saman		Traditional	
Malaysia	ASTRO Malaysia		Contemporary	
Maldives	Bodu Beru		Traditional	
Philippines	Sarimanok		Contemporary	
Philippines	Singkil		Traditional	
Uzbekistan	Lezgi		Traditional	
