= ABU TV Song Festival 2013 =

Date and venue
- Final: 26 October 2013
- Venue: Hanoi Opera House, Hanoi, Vietnam

Organisation
- Host broadcaster: Vietnam Television
- Presenters: Jamaica dela Cruz; Hong Phuc

Participants
- Number of entries: 15 countries; 16 songs
- Debuting countries: Brunei; Iran; Kyrgyzstan; Thailand
- Non-returning countries: None
- Participation map: Participating countries

The ABU TV Song Festival 2013 was the second annual edition of the ABU TV Song Festivals. The festival, which is non-competitive, that took place on 26 October 2013 in the Hanoi Opera House, Hanoi, Vietnam and coinciding with the 50th general assembly of the Asia-Pacific Broadcasting Union (ABU) which took place between 23 and 29 October 2013. Sixteen songs from fifteen countries participated in the second edition of the event. Brunei, Iran, Kyrgyzstan, and Thailand made their début at the festival

== Location ==
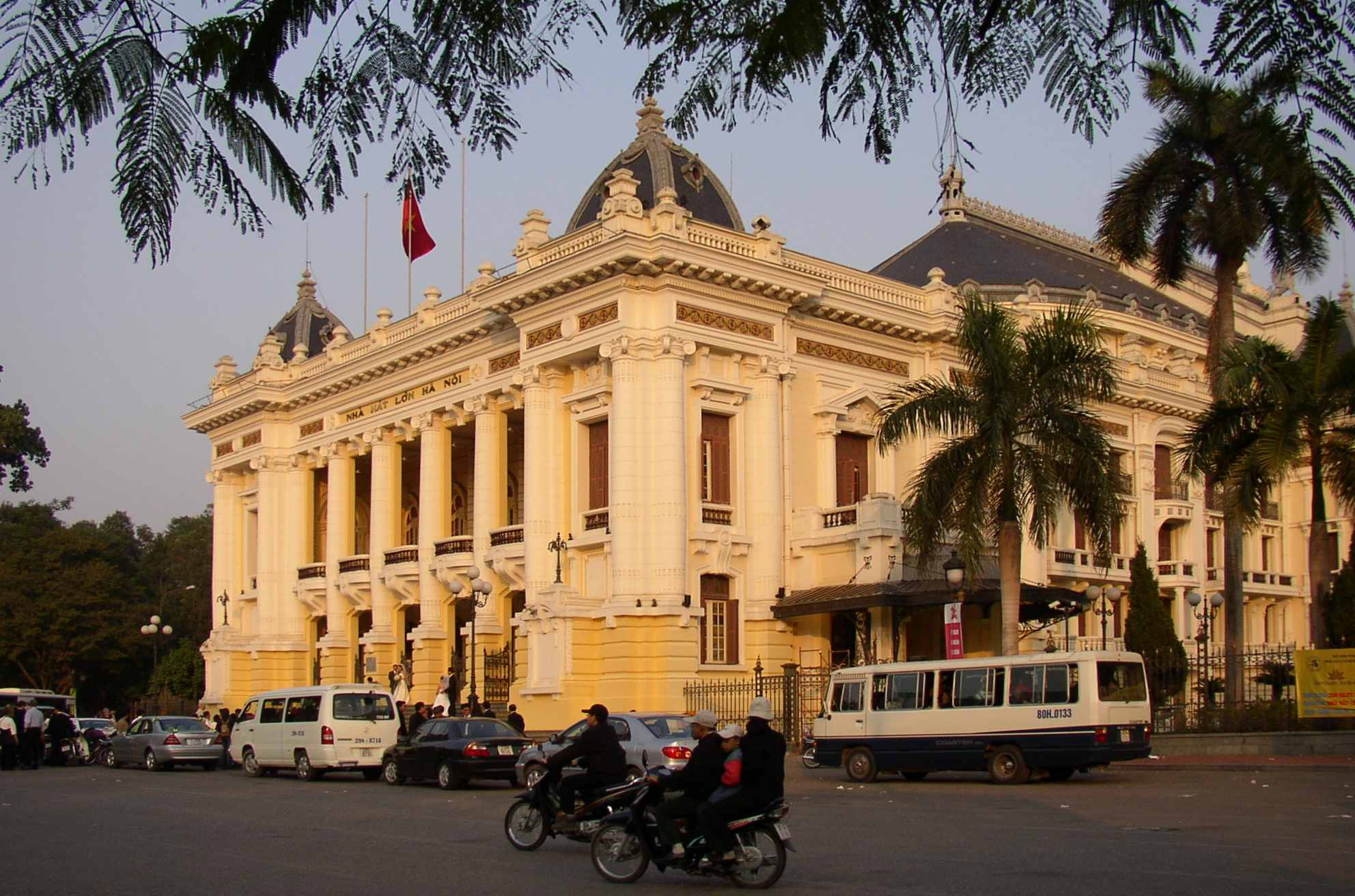
Hanoi Opera House, venue for the ABU TV Song Festival 2013

Hanoi is the capital of Vietnam and the country's second largest city. Its population in 2009 was estimated at 2.6 million for urban districts, 6.5 million for the metropolitan jurisdiction. From 1010 until 1802, it was the most important political centre of Vietnam. It was eclipsed by Huế, the imperial capital of Vietnam during the Nguyen dynasty (1802-1945), but Hanoi served as the capital of French Indochina from 1902 to 1954. From 1954 to 1976, it was the capital of North Việt Nam, and it became the capital of a reunified Vietnam in 1976, after the North's victory in the Vietnam War.

The city is located on the right bank of the Red River. Hanoi is located at 1,760 km (1,090 mi) north of Ho Chi Minh City and at 120 km (75 mi) west of Hai Phong city.

Initially, Vietnam Cultural Friendship Hall was chosen as the festival's venue. The venue was later changed to Hanoi Opera House, which was smaller in terms of capacity (nearly 600 seats in comparison to 1100 seats of the former)

=== National host broadcaster ===
Vietnam Television will be the host broadcaster for the second edition of the annual Song Festival. The venue for the 2013 TV Song Festival is the Hanoi Opera House in central Hanoi, Vietnam.

== Format ==
Unlike the format used in the Eurovision Song Contest there are two versions of the ABU Song Festivals. The ABU Radio Song Festival which is a biennial competitive event and the ABU TV Song Festival which is an annual non-competitive event. The TV Song Festival is scheduled to take place on 26 October 2013, in conjunction with the 50th ABU General Assembly which takes place between 23 and 29 October 2013. During the TV Festival, musicians from participating countries will perform a song from their repertoire in a musical gala presentation.

== Participating countries ==
A total of fifteen countries took part in the 2013 ABU TV Song Festival.

Draw	Country	Artist	Song	Language
01	Thailand	Kandy	"Aeb saeb"	Thai
02	Brunei	Qeez Idrus	"Salahkah Aku"	Malay
03	Hong Kong	Mag Lam (林欣彤)	"Shi Jian" (時間)	Mandarin
04	Indonesia	Putri and Shella	"Mimpiku"	Indonesian
05	Vietnam	Văn Mai Hương	"Là em đó"	Vietnamese
06	Australia	Justice Crew	"Boom Boom" and "Everybody" (mashup)	English
07	Malaysia	Alyah	"Kisah hati"	Malay
08	Iran	Mohsen Mirzadeh (محسن میرزازاده)	"Arman" (رمان)	Persian
09	Kyrgyzstan	Tola Tursunaliev (Тола Турсуналиев)	"Enekeme"(Энэкеме)	Kyrgyz
10	Japan	May'n (メイン)	"ViViD"	Japanese
11	Sri Lanka	Sarith & Surith	"Together, Forever"	English
12	Singapore	Shabir	"Maybe"	Tamil, English
13	Afghanistan	Shahzad Adeel (شهزاد عادل)	"Ma Ba Tu'em (ما به تو ایم)	Dari
14	China	Splendid7	"Ài ràng wǒmen zài yīqǐ" (爱让我们在一起)	Mandarin
15	South Korea	Sistar	"Give It to Me"	Korean, English
16	Vietnam	Ngũ Cung	"Cao nguyên đá"	Vietnamese

== International broadcasts ==
Each participating country was invited to broadcast the event across their respective networks and provide commentary in the native languages to add insight and description to the shows.

- Afghanistan – Radio Television Afghanistan (RTA)
- Australia – SBS Two (9 November 2013)
- Brunei – Radio Televisyen Brunei (RTB)
- China – China Central Television (CCTV)
- Hong Kong – Television Broadcasts Limited (TVB)
- Indonesia – Televisi Republik Indonesia (23 November 2013)
- Iran – Islamic Republic of Iran Broadcasting (IRIB)
- Japan – Japan Broadcasting Corporation (NHK)
- Kyrgyzstan – Kyrgyz Television (KTRK)
- Malaysia – Radio Televisyen Malaysia (RTM) (26 December 2013)
- Singapore – MediaCorp Suria
- South Korea – Korean Broadcasting System (KBS)
- Sri Lanka – MTV Channel (MTV)
- Thailand – National Broadcasting Services of Thailand (NBT)
- Vietnam (host) – VTV (26 October 2013; live)
