= ABU TV Song Festival 2023 =

Twelfth annual musical showcase

Date and venue
- Final: 29 October 2023
- Venue: KBS Hall, Seoul

Organisation
- Host broadcaster: KBS
- Presenters: Park So-hyun; Cho Hang-ri

Participants
- Number of entries: 11
- Returning countries: China; Hong Kong; Sri Lanka; Macau; Malaysia
- Non-returning countries: Indonesia; Kazakhstan; Maldives

The ABU TV Song Festival 2023 was the twelfth annual edition of the ABU TV Song Festival. The program was hosted by Park So-hyun and Cho Hang-ri

== List of participants ==
Broadcasters from eleven countries participated in the ABU TV Song Festival 2023.

Draw	Country	Artist	Song	Language
1	Turkmenistan	Annamyradow Begmyrat	"White City with Arkadag"	Turkmen, English
2	China	Tia Ray	"Ready for Love"	Mandarin, English
3	India	Malini Awasthi	"Ram Ji Ke Bhaile Janamva" (राम जी के भइले जनमवा)	Awadhi
4	Sri Lanka	Sheron Silva	"Lunu Dehi" (ලුණු දෙහි)	Sinhala
5	Turkey	Umut Sülünoğlu and Uğur Önür	"Yolcu"	Turkish
6	Macau	Winifai	"The Philosophy of Happiness"	Cantonese, English
7	Vietnam	Erik (Lê Trung Thành)	"Ghen" (惚)	Vietnamese
8	Malaysia	Aina Abdul	"Terus Hidup"	Malay
9	Hong Kong	Chau Kat Pui	"Forever Love"	Mandarin
10	Japan	Ayaka Hirahara	"Jupiter"	Japanese, English
11	South Korea	Mamamoo+	"Chico malo"	Korean, Spanish
