= ABU TV Song Festival 2020 =

Ninth annual edition

Dates
- Final: 14 December 2020

Host
- Venue: Maverick Pulse Studio, Kuala Lumpur
- Presenter(s): Iman Corinne Adrienne; Sharizan Borhan
- Host broadcaster: Radio Televisyen Malaysia (RTM)

Participants
- Number of entries: 14 countries; 15 songs
- Debuting countries: Nepal; Vanuatu
- Returning countries: Brunei; Malaysia; Turkmenistan; Uzbekistan
- Non-returning countries: Australia; Hong Kong; Kazakhstan

The ABU TV Song Festival 2020 was the ninth annual edition of the ABU TV Song Festivals.

== History ==
The event, which is non-competitive, took place in the capital city of Kuala Lumpur, Malaysia, coinciding with the 57th General Assembly of the Asia-Pacific Broadcasting Union (ABU).

Originally, the Vietnamese city of Hanoi was chosen to host the contest for the second time after 2013, but withdrew their intention to host the show in August 2020.

== List of participants ==
A total of fourteen countries took part in the ABU TV Song Festival 2020. Nepal and Vanuatu made their debut in the event, with Brunei, Turkmenistan, Uzbekistan and host country Malaysia returning. Australia, Hong Kong and Kazakhstan withdrew from the festival.

Draw	Country	Artist	Song	Language
1	South Korea	Lee Tae-min	"Idea"	Korean, English
2	Turkey	Öykü Gürman	"For Your One Word"	Turkish
3	Indonesia	Epo D’Fenomenon	"My Love Get Locked Down"	Indonesian
4	Uzbekistan	Ilyosbek I. Arabov	"What Happens – Come"	Uzbek
5	India	Akashvani Vadya Vrind	"My India"	Hindi
6	Brunei	Auf Ismail	"I Am The Star"	Malay
7	China	Sonam Gonpo	"You And Me On The Plateau"	Mandarin
8	Vietnam	Dương Hoàng Yến	"Hanoi Beauties In 12 Flower Seasons"	Vietnamese
9	Japan	Hatsune Miku	"Hand In Hand"	Japanese
10	Macao	Sean Pang	"Unsatisfied"	Cantonese
11	Macao	Germano Guilherme	"United"	English, Cantonese, Mandarin, Portuguese
12	Nepal	Sindhu Malla	"Pirati ko jala"	Nepali
13	Turkmenistan	Begmyrat Annamyradov	"Neutrality (Bitarap yurt Turkmenistan)"	Turkmen
14	Vanuatu	Tokosouwia	"Resilience"	Bislama
15	Malaysia	Floor 88	"Debt"	Malay
