= ABU TV Song Festival 2018 =

Song festival in Ashgabat, Turkmenistan

Date and venue
- Final: 2 October 2018
- Venue: Ashgabat Ice Palace, Ashgabat, Turkmenistan

Organisation
- Host broadcaster: State Committee of Turkmenistan for Television, Radio Programs and Cinematography (TVTM)
- Presenters: Tahyr Hojaev; Zybagozel Muhammedova

Participants
- Number of entries: 16 countries; 18 songs
- Debuting countries: Benin; Russia; Uzbekistan
- Returning countries: Kyrgyzstan; Turkey
- Non-returning countries: China; Malaysia; Zambia

The ABU TV Song Festival 2018 was the seventh annual edition of the ABU TV Song Festivals.

== History ==
The event, which is non-competitive, took place in Ashgabat, Turkmenistan and coinciding with the 55th General Assembly of the Asia-Pacific Broadcasting Union (ABU).

== List of participants ==
A total of sixteen countries took part in the ABU TV Song Festival 2018. Benin, Russia and Uzbekistan made their debut in the event, with Kyrgyzstan and Turkey returning. China, Malaysia and Zambia all withdrew from the festival. Benin represented the entry from the African Union of Broadcasting.

Draw	Country	Artist	Song	Language
1	Afghanistan	Negar Mandegar	"Delbar"	Persian
2	Indonesia	Lana Nitibaskara	"Reach For The Stars"	English, Indonesian
3	Kazakhstan	Nursultan Zhexenbin	"I'm inflamed"	Kazakh
4	Japan	Eir Aoi	"Ignite"	Japanese
5	Turkmenistan	Myahri Pirgulyeva	"Mondjukatdy"	Turkmen
6	Hong Kong	Thye Cho Yee	"Chasing Dream"	Cantonese
7	Russia	Indzhihan Gulmuhometova	"My Turkmenistan"	Russian
8	Kyrgyzstan	Gulzhigit Kalykov	"Rain"	Kyrgyz
9	Benin	Tiboy Shalla	"Numba"	English, Fon, French
10	India	Kushal Paul & Mehul Grover	"Raaj Kapoor Medley"	Hindi
11	Turkey	Güliz Ayla & Bahadır Tatlıöz	"Kimin umrunda"	Turkish
12	South Korea	K.Will	"Talk Love/Please don't..."	Korean
13	Macau	Germano Bibi Guilherme	"Nai de zhu jimo"	Mandarin
14	Turkmenistan	Begench Charyev	"Love"	Turkmen
15	Maldives	Mohamed Abdul Ghanee & Mariyam Ashfa	"Flower"	Maldivian
16	Vietnam	Pham Khanh Linh	"Back to winter"	Vietnamese
17	Uzbekistan	Fahriddin Hamdamov	"Come to me"	Uzbek
18	Turkmenistan	Gulshat Gurdova & Parahat Amandurdyev	"Turkmenistan"	Turkmen
