= ABU Popular Song Contest =

- Also known as: Asia Broadcasting Union Song Contest
- Genre: Music competition
- Based on: Eurovision Song Contest by the European Broadcasting Union
- No. of seasons: 3 editions

Production
- Production company: Asia-Pacific Broadcasting Union

Original release
- Release: 12 October 1985 – 26 September 1987

Related
- ABU Radio Song Festival; ABU Song Festival

The ABU Popular Song Contest (also known as the Asia Broadcasting Union Song Contest) was a competitive song contest created by the Asia-Pacific Broadcasting Union (ABU) that was based on the format of the Eurovision Song Contest. It ran for three editions from 1985 to 1987.

== Background and development ==
Prior to the ABU Popular Song Contest, there was the short-lived, Pacific Song Festival. In 1979, there were seven entries, one each from Australia, Canada, Hong Kong, Japan, Korea, New Zealand and Philippines with New Zealand winning with the song "Nothing but Dreams", written by Carl Doy and performed by Tina Cross.

In 1980, Cross entered again for New Zealand, coming second with the song "Once Again With You". Australia came first.

== Editions ==
=== 1985 ===
- Date: 12 October 1985
- Location: Singapore
- Broadcaster: SBC
- Hosts: Naseer Kamaruddin and Jenny Teo

Participants:

1. Fiji – Danny Costello
2. Australia – Robby Krupsi
3. Turkey – Ahmet Özhan – "Ömrümüzün Baharı"
4. Thailand – Anchalee Chong Khadikij
5. Indonesia – Vina Panduwinata – "Burung Camar" ("Seagull")
6. Hong Kong – Danny Summer
7. Pakistan – Muhammad Ali Shehki and Allan Faoeer
8. Philippines – Ivy Violand
9. New Zealand – Rob Winch
10. Brunei – Johari Hj Omar
11. India – K. P. Udayabhanu
12. Singapore – Peter Chua
13. South Korea – Chung Eun Sook and Koo Chang Mo
14. Japan – Hiromi Iwasaki
15. Malaysia – Sudirman Hj Arshad – "Pesta Dunia"

=== 1986 ===
- Date: 21 November 1986
- Location: Michael Fowler Centre, Wellington, New Zealand
- Broadcaster: TVNZ
- Hosts: Pete Sinclair and Judy Bailey
- Debuting Countries: Sri Lanka
- Winner: New Zealand

Participants:

1. Singapore – Kay Hamid
2. Japan – Yoshie
3. Brunei – Salmaya Hj.Hussein
4. Hong Kong – Anthony Lun
5. Australia – Andrea Lee and Michael
6. Fiji – Daniel Res Stello
7. Sri Lanka – Ivod Dennis and Angelina
8. Malaysia – Kathijah Ibrahim
9. Indonesia – Diana Nasution and Melke Goeslkow
10. South Korea – Choi Jin Hee
11. New Zealand – Bunny Walters – "Taken By Love"

=== 1987 ===
- Date: 26 September 1987
- Location: Putra World Trade Centre, Kuala Lumpur, Malaysia
- Broadcaster: RTM
- Winner: Australia. First prize was trophy and $10,000AUD.

Participants:

1. South Korea – Chang Deok – "Dang sin eul ki da lil li" (I Will Wait for You)
2. Australia – Catherine Ceberano – "Time Can't Keep Us Apart" (Allan Zavod)– 1st
3. Indonesia – Elfa's Singers – "Pesta" (Party)
4. Hong Kong – Blue Jeans – "No Such Reason”"
5. New Zealand – Annie Crummer – "It's That What Friends Are For" (Geoff Cavander) – 3rd
6. Philippines – Dulce – "Langit" (Heaven) – 2nd
7. Japan – Miyuku Utsumi – "Kokuhaku" (My Truth)
8. Singapore – Robert Fernando – "Back in Love Again"
9. Malaysia – Francissa Peter & William Clark – "Cinta Abadi"
10. Brunei – Joffry & Norhayati – "Kedamaian" (Peace and Quiet)

== See also ==
- ABU events
