= Saba TV Network =

Afghan satellite television network

- Type: satellite television network
- Country: Afghanistan
- Availability: Afghanistan
- Owner: Saba Media Organization
- Launch date: 2006 (founded); Late 2007 (first broadcast)
- Official website: www.sabacent.org

Saba TV Network is an Afghan satellite television network featuring two television channels. They are Saba TV and Saba World. It is owned by Saba Media Organization. It is being broadcast throughout Afghanistan. It was launched in Spring 2006, and started broadcasting in late 2007.

Saba TV and Saba World is especially made for those who want to learn everything in the wild, and medical care.

== Satellite ==
The channel is available to Cable TV and Satellite, on Yamal 202 at 49E. Saba TV also has different entertainment programs, such as TER YADOONA (The Past Memories), which is dedicated for Old is Gold Songs of Afghanistan, India and Iran. It is broadcast 6 days a week at 16:00, Afghan Time. They also have beneficial programs for children, called AKO BAKO.

== See also ==
- Television in Afghanistan
