= Labour Square =

Town square in Hanoi, Vietnam

- Quảng trường 1-5
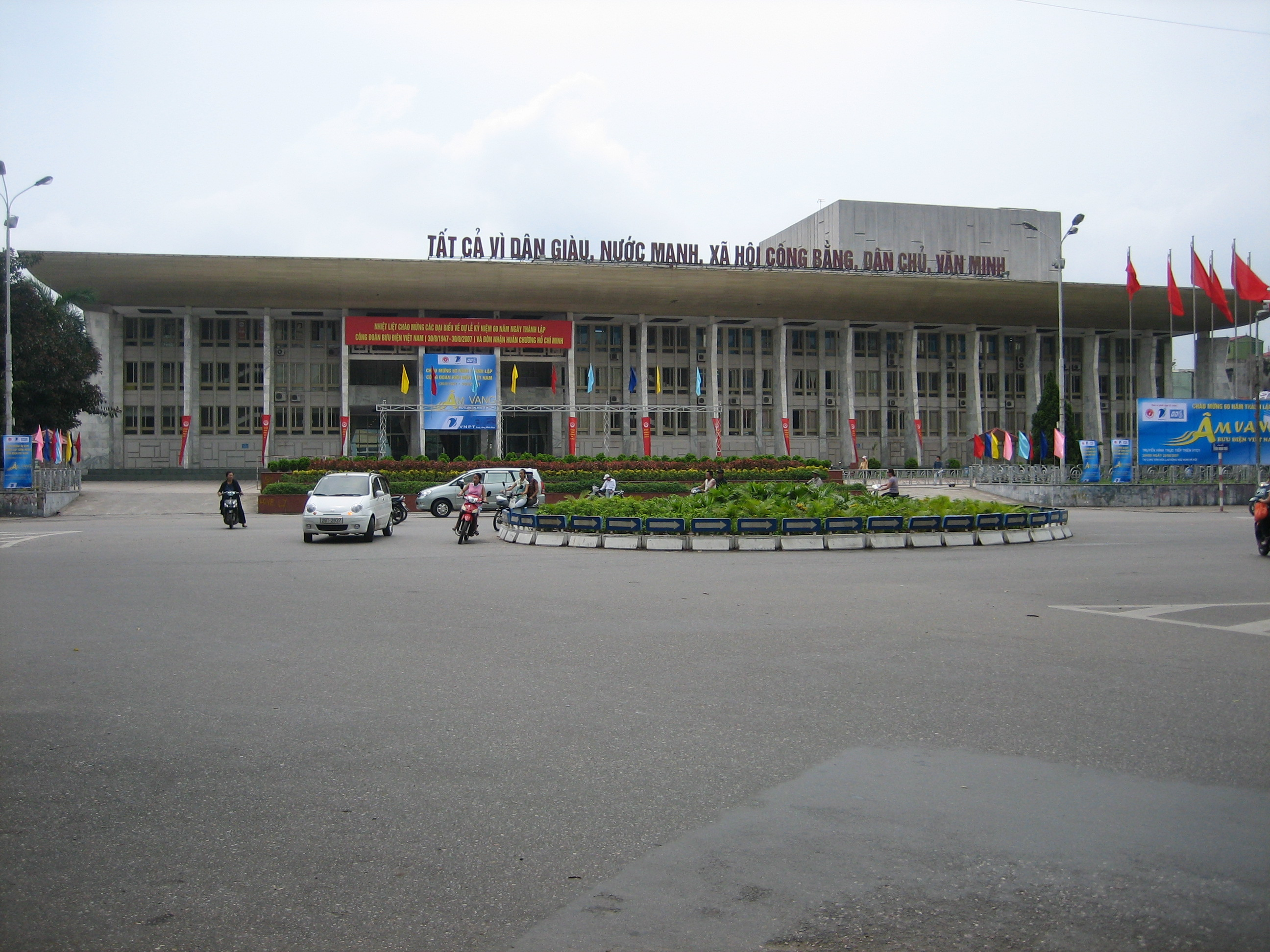
- Labour Square
- Interactive map of Labour Square
- Type: Town square
- Location: Hoàn Kiếm district, Hanoi, Vietnam
- Coordinates: 21°01′23″N 105°50′40″E

Labour Square or 1-5 Square (Vietnamese: Quảng trường Lao động or Quảng trường 1-5) is a town square located in Hoàn Kiếm district, Hanoi, Vietnam.

The square is formed by the intersection between Quan Su and Tran Hung Dao streets and the front ground of the Ha Noi Friendship Cultural Palace.

== See also ==
- Ba Đình Square
