= ABU TV Song Festival 2024 =

Song festival in Istanbul, Turkey

Date and venue
- Final: 20 October 2024
- Venue: Istanbul Lütfi Kırdar ICEC, Istanbul

Organisation
- Host broadcaster: TRT

Participants
- Number of entries: 11
- Returning countries: Indonesia; Uzbekistan
- Non-returning countries: Sri Lanka; Vietnam

The ABU TV Song Festival 2024 was the thirteenth annual edition of the ABU TV Song Festival. The program was hosted in Turkey with Istanbul Lütfi Kırdar International Convention and Exhibition Center, Istanbul as its venue.

== List of participants ==
Broadcasters from eleven different countries participated in the ABU TV Song Festival 2024.

Draw	Country	Artist	Song	Language
1	China	Shan Yichun	"Time Whispers"	Mandarin
2	Hong Kong	Germano Guilherme	"A Needle in a Haystack"	Cantonese
3	India	Hemant Brijwasi	"Sanware" (साँवरे)	Hindi
4	Indonesia	Silet Open Up	"Kaka Main Salah"	Kupang Malay
5	Japan	Yoko Takahashi	"A Cruel Angel's Thesis"	Japanese
6	South Korea	Lee Mu-jin	"Episode"	Korean
7	Malaysia	Khai Bahar	"Bayang"	Malay
8	Macau	Elisa Chan	"Desire 404"	Cantonese
9	Turkmenistan	Shatlyk Gurbannazarow	"Our Arkadag"	Turkmen
10	Turkey	Sinan Akçıl	"Fark Atıyor"	Turkish
11	Uzbekistan	"BEK" Milliy Sozlar Ansambli	"Uzbek National Potpourri"	Uzbek
