= ABU TV Song Festival 2017 =

Song festival in Chengdu, China

Date and venue
- Final: 1 November 2017
- Venue: S1 SRT Studio, Chengdu, China

Organisation
- Host broadcaster: Sichuan Radio and Television (SRT)

Participants
- Number of entries: 14
- Debuting countries: Turkmenistan; Zambia
- Returning countries: India; Malaysia
- Non-returning countries: Sri Lanka; Tunisia

The ABU TV Song Festival 2017 was the sixth annual edition of the ABU TV Song Festivals. The event, which is non-competitive, took place in Chengdu, China on 1 November 2017.

== Location ==
On 1 January 2017, it was announced by the Asia-Pacific Broadcasting Union (ABU) that Chengdu, had been chosen to host the sixth edition of the TV Song Festival on 25 October 2017.

== Participation list ==
Draw	Country	Artist	Song	Language
1	Macau	Catalyser	Midnight is the Time for God	Mandarin
2	Afghanistan	Ghulam Mahiuddin Farukh	Qarsak Song (Qarsak)	Arabic
3	India	Shri Kailash Kher	Beloved (Saiyaan) & Crazy For You (Teri Deewani)	Hindi
4	Zambia	Hezron Ngosa	Lead Me (Munidangilienge)	English, Swahili
5	Vietnam	Lương Nguyệt Ánh	Country Lullaby (Hồ trên núi)	Vietnamese
6	Indonesia	Januarisman	Blue Night	Indonesian
7	South Korea	MAMAMOO	Yes, I Am	Korean
8	China	Yisa Yu	Tea	Mandarin
9	Turkmenistan	Sohbet Kasimov	With You	Turkmen
10	Hong Kong	Alvin Ng	How Can I Do	Cantonese
11	Kazakhstan	Gazret Yerzhanov	Admire (Yapurai)	Kazakh
12	Japan	LiSA	Catch The Moment	Japanese
13	Maldives	Mohamed Thasneem	A Tourists View	Maldivian
14	Malaysia	Syameel	More Perfect (Lebih Sempurna)	Malay
