= ABU TV Song Festival 2015 =

Fourth ABU TV Song Festival

Date and venue
- Final: 28 October 2015
- Venue: Istanbul Congress Center, Istanbul, Turkey

Organisation
- Host broadcaster: Turkish Radio and Television Corporation (TRT)
- Presenters: Ece Vahapoğlu; Engin Hepileri

Participants
- Number of entries: 12
- Debuting countries: India; Kazakhstan
- Returning countries: Afghanistan; Malaysia
- Non-returning countries: Australia; Brunei; China; Thailand
- Participation map: Participating countries Countries that participated in the past but not in 2015

The ABU TV Song Festival 2015 was the fourth annual edition of the ABU TV Song Festivals. The event, which is non-competitive, took place in Istanbul, Turkey and coinciding with the 52nd General Assembly of the Asia-Pacific Broadcasting Union (ABU) which was scheduled for 28 October 2015. Twelve countries have confirmed their participation.

== Location ==
It was announced that the 2015 ABU TV Song Festival will take place in the Turkish city of Istanbul, and coincide with the 52nd General Assembly of the Asia-Pacific Broadcasting Union (ABU). Istanbul previously played hosts to the Eurovision Song Contest 2004, when the contest took place in the Abdi İpekçi Arena. For the 4th edition of ABU TV Song Festival, Istanbul Congress Center was selected to be the venue of the event.

=== Host broadcaster ===
Turkish Radio and Television Corporation (TRT) was the host broadcaster for the festival on 28 October 2015.

== Format ==
The ABU TV Song Festival celebrates the popular music culture by showcasing high-profile musical acts from each of the participating ABU broadcasting members, in a non-competitive manner.

== List of participants ==
Twelve countries have been announced as participating at the 2015 edition, with India and Kazakhstan making their début; Afghanistan and Malaysia returning after a one-year absence; whilst Australia, Brunei and China have decided to withdraw from the festival. Iran, Tunisia and Thailand were initially announced as participating at the 2015 edition, however they were withdrawn of the participating list for unknown reasons.

Draw	Country	Artist	Song	Language
1	Afghanistan	Mozhdah	"Ghoroore Tu, Shikaste Ma"	Persian
2	Maldives	Mariyam Unoosha	"The Maldives Song"	English, Maldivian
3	Kazakhstan	Dimash Kudaibergen	"Daididau"	Kazakh
4	Macau	Ma Man Lei, Kyla (馬曼莉)	"Beiduibei" (背對背)	Cantonese
5	India	Sanjeevani Bhelande	"Radiant Ruby"	English, Hindi
6	Vietnam	Dinh Manh Ninh	"In the music tonight"	English, Vietnamese
7	Japan	Scandal	"Sisters"	Japanese, English
8	Indonesia	Zahra Damariva	"Tak Kembali"	Indonesian
9	Hong Kong	Vivian Koo，Tracy Gu Wei (谷微)	"Accept The Part" (安守本份)	Cantonese
10	South Korea	CNBLUE	"Cinderella"	Korean, English
11	Malaysia	Ernie Zakri	"Dialah di Hati"	Malay
12	Turkey	Murat Dalkiliç	"Katilimiz Olursun"	Turkish

=== Withdrawn ===
The following three countries withdrew their entries to the contest for a variety of reasons.

Country	Artist	Song	Language
Iran			
Thailand	Lamyong Nonghinhow	"Jeep Aow Si Kha"(จีบเอาสิคะ)	Thai
Tunisia	Olfa Ben Romdhane	"The People Asked Me"	Tunisian Arabic

== International broadcasts ==
Each participating country was invited to broadcast the event across their respective networks and provide commentary in their native languages to add insight and description to the shows.

- Afghanistan – Ariana Television Network (ATN)
- Hong Kong – Television Broadcasts Limited (TVB)
- India – Doordarshan (DD)
- Indonesia – Televisi Republik Indonesia (TVRI)
- Japan – Japanese Broadcasting Corporation (NHK)
- Kazakhstan – Kazakhstan Radio and Television Corporation (KRTC)
- Macau – Teledifusão de Macau (TDM)
- Malaysia – Radio Television Malaysia (RTM)
- Maldives – Television Maldives (TVM)
- South Korea – Korean Broadcasting System (KBS)
- Turkey – Turkish Radio and Television Corporation (TRT)
- Vietnam – Vietnam Television (VTV)

== Other countries ==
- Australia – On 3 June, Special Broadcasting Service (SBS) confirmed that they would not participate in the 2015 edition.
- Brunei – On 25 June, Radio Televisyen Brunei (RTB) confirmed that they would not participate in the 2015 edition.
- New Zealand – Television New Zealand (TVNZ) confirmed on 11 June 2015 that they have no intention to make their début in 2015.

=== Associate ABU members ===
- Russia – On 30 July 2015, AIST TV confirmed that they will not be making their début at the ABU TV Song Festival in Turkey.
