= Asiavision (news exchange) =

News exchange

- Founded: 1 January 1984; 42 years ago
- Headquarters: Kuala Lumpur, Malaysia
- Owner: Asia-Pacific Broadcasting Union

Asiavision (AVN) is a video news exchange operated by the Asia-Pacific Broadcasting Union's (ABU) News department. More than 15,000 news stories are shared each year. It is a non profit, non political organisation funded by members.

Asiavision began in 1984, as Kuala Lumpur became the centre for TV news exchange replacing Singapore. There are currently 27 Asiavision members including NHK (Japan), KBS (Korea), CCTV (China), DDI (India), TRT (Turkiye), TVRI (Indonesia), TPBS (Thailand), SLRC (Sri Lanka), NTV (Nepal), BTV (Bangladesh), FBC (Fiji) and MTRK (Uzbekistan). The full list is available on the ABU website. The ABU is based in the Malaysian capital, Kuala Lumpur, at the RTM headquarters in Angkasapuri.

Asiavision stories are suitable for television and all digital platforms including online news, YouTube and social media. Asiavision includes breaking news, headline news, business news, and issues-based content on the environment, health, technology, sport, education, culture, innovation and the arts. Asiavision also provides members with stories from the ABU's sister unions: the European Broadcasting Union, the Arab States Broadcasting Union and the African Union of Broadcasters. More than half of all items are same day news.

ABU News hosts an annual News Group meeting and the Global News Forum. Monthly and annual awards celebrate the best content on Asiavision.
