= ABU TV Song Festival 2022 =

Eleventh annual gala edition

Date and venue
- Final: 27 November 2022
- Venue: Siri Fort Auditorium, New Delhi

Organisation
- Host broadcaster: Prasar Bharati
- Presenters: Nitin Kakkar; Hrishita Bhatt

Participants
- Number of entries: 9
- Returning countries: Maldives; Turkmenistan
- Non-returning countries: Brunei; Macau; Malaysia

The ABU TV Song Festival 2022 was the eleventh annual edition of the ABU TV Song Festivals.

== History ==
The event, which is non-competitive, took place in New Delhi, coinciding with the 59th General Assembly of the Asia-Pacific Broadcasting Union (ABU). This edition also marked the first live show after two consecutive years of pre-recorded virtual performances due to COVID-19 pandemic.

== List of participants ==
A total of nine countries took part in the ABU TV Song Festival 2022.

Draw	Country	Artist	Song	Language
1	South Korea	Kang Daniel	"Parade"	Korean
2	Kazakhstan	Madi Syzdikov	"Sensiz" (Сенсіз)	Kazakh, Russian, English, Italian
3	India	Sniti Mishra	"Darbari Fusion"	Hindi
4	Turkey	Sedat Anar; Damla Anar; Selahattin Anar	"Halk İçre Bir Ayineyim"	Turkish
5	Japan	Win Morisaki	"Parade"	Japanese, English
6	Vietnam	Lê Thị Minh Ngọc	"Endless Red River"	Vietnamese
7	Maldives	Shammoon Mohamed	"Magey Raajje (My Maldives)" (މަގެތަރުޖަމާ)	Dhivehi
8	Turkmenistan	Ahmet Atajanow	"Dunýa dursun" (Дуня дурсун)	Turkmen
9	Indonesia	Putri Ayu Silaen	"Never Enough"	English
