= ABU TV Song Festival 2019 =

Ninth annual edition

Date and venue
- Final: 19 November 2019
- Venue: NHK Hall, Tokyo

Organisation
- Host broadcaster: Nippon Hoso Kyokai (NHK)
- Presenters: Shingo Murakami; Yuki Sugiura

Participants
- Number of entries: 11 countries; 14 songs
- Returning countries: Australia; China
- Non-returning countries: Afghanistan; Benin; Kyrgyzstan; Maldives; Russia; Turkmenistan; Uzbekistan

The ABU TV Song Festival 2019 was the eighth annual edition of the ABU TV Song Festivals.

== History ==
The event, which is non-competitive, took place in Tokyo, coinciding with the 56th General Assembly of the Asia-Pacific Broadcasting Union (ABU).

== List of participants ==
A total of eleven countries took part in the ABU TV Song Festival 2019. Australia returned to the event after five year absence. Apart from the participating songs, the show also included special performances from Joe Hisaishi and Foorin.

Draw	Country	Artist	Song	Language
1	Vietnam	Hoàng Thùy Linh	"Để Mị Nói Cho Mà Nghe"	Vietnamese
2	Australia	Dan Sultan	"Cul-de-sac"	English
3	Macao	Adelino da Silva	"Leave Again"	Chinese, English
4	Japan	Hey! Say! JUMP	"Fanfare" "Come On A My House" "Ue o Muite Arukō"	Japanese, English
5	Indonesia	Hanin Dhiya	"Berkawan Dengan Rindu"	Indonesian
6	Hong Kong	Kay Tse	"Reposing Beside You" (只想死於你身邊)	Cantonese
7	Turkey	Mustafa Sandal	"Aya Benzer"	Turkish
8	South Korea	TWICE	"Feel Special"	Korean
9	Kazakhstan	Dimash Kudaibergen	"S.O.S d'un terrien en détresse"	French
10	India	A. R. Rahman	"Mausam & Escape" "Jai Ho"	Hindi
11	China	Na Ying	"Silence" (默)	Chinese
