= Mongolian State Academic Drama Theatre =

Theatre in Sükhbaatar, Ulaanbaatar, Mongolia

- Улсын драмын эрдмийн театр
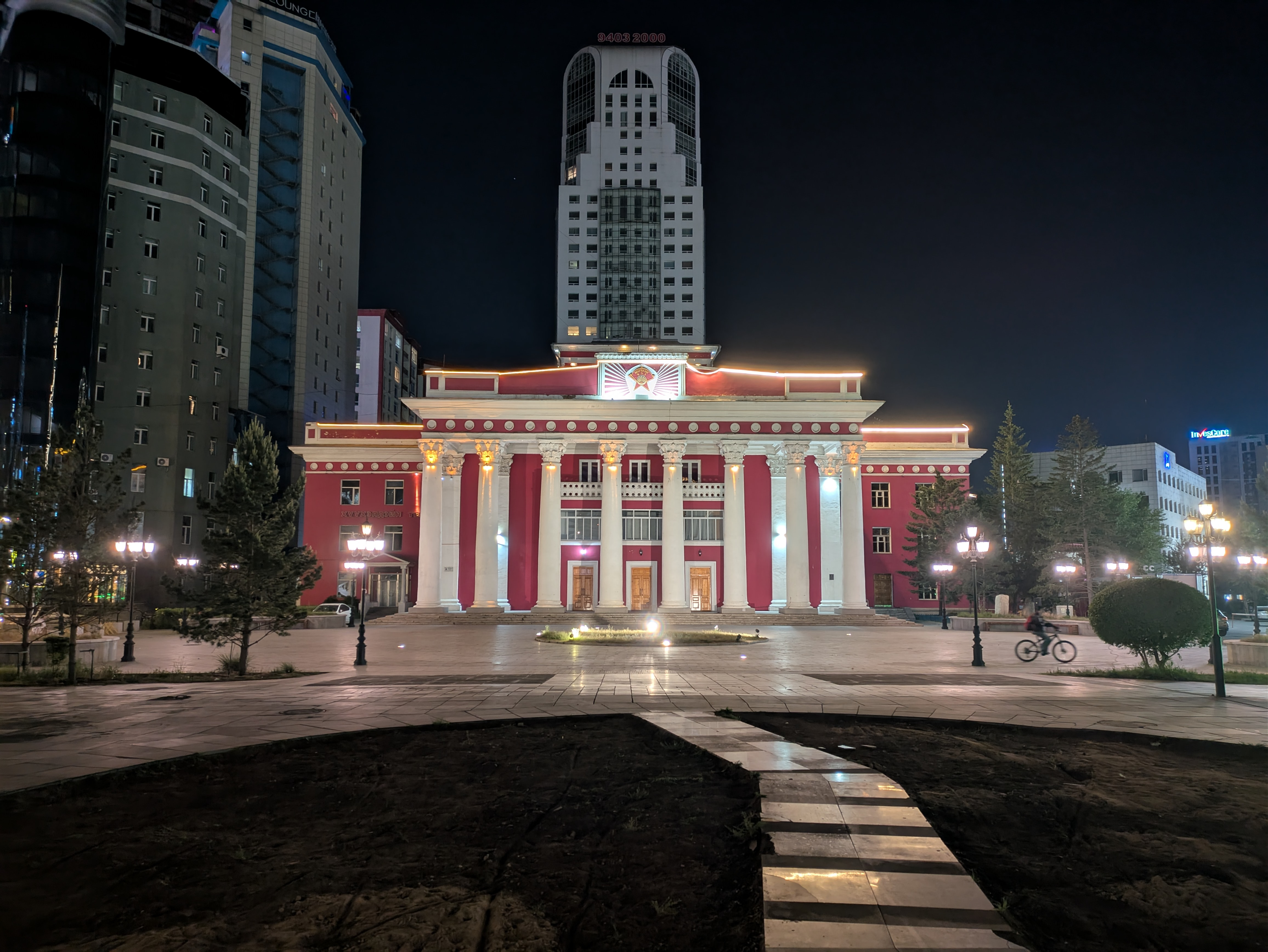
- At night in 2025
- Interactive map of Mongolian State Academic Drama Theatre
- Address: Sükhbaatar, Ulaanbaatar; Mongolia
- Coordinates: 47.9161485°N 106.9137128°E

The Mongolian State Academic Drama Theatre (Mongolian: Улсын Драмын Эрдмийн Театр, also known as the National Academic Drama Theatre) is a theatre based in Sükhbaatar District, Ulaanbaatar, Mongolia. It was established on November 12, 1931.

There have been several name changes over the course of its existence, including "Эстрад концертын товчоо" (Stage Concert Bureau), "Ардын дуу, танц, үндэсний хөгжмийн ансамбль" (National Ensemble of Folk Song, Dance and Music), "Ардын дуу, танцны Улсын ансамбль"/"Ардын дуу бүжгийн улсын чуулга" (National Ensemble of Folk Song and Dances), and "Улсын ардын дуу бүжгийн чуулга" (National Folk Song and Dance Ensemble). In 2002, it became "Үндэсний дуу бүжгийн эрдмийн чуулга" (National Academic Ensemble of Song and Dance), and in 2016, renamed "Үндэсний Урлагийн Их Театр" (Grand Theatre of National Arts).
