= ABU TV Song Festival 2014 =

Song festival in Macau, China

Date and venue
- Final: 25 October 2014
- Venue: Sands Theatre, Macau, China

Organisation
- Host broadcaster: Teledifusão de Macau (TDM)
- Presenters: Carmen Chau & Bonnith Kuok

Participants
- Number of entries: 12
- Debuting countries: Macau; Maldives; Turkey
- Returning countries: None
- Non-returning countries: Afghanistan; Kyrgyzstan; Iran; Malaysia; Singapore; Sri Lanka
- Participation map: Participating countries Countries that participated in the past but not in 2014

The ABU TV Song Festival 2014 was the third annual edition of the ABU TV Song Festival. The festival, which is non-competitive, took place on the 25 October 2014 at Sands Theatre in Macau and coinciding with the 51st General Assembly of the Asia-Pacific Broadcasting Union (ABU) which took place between 22 and 28 October 2014. Twelve countries confirmed their participation. The Maldives, Turkey as well as the host country Macau made their début at the festival. Afghanistan, Kyrgyzstan, Iran, Malaysia, Singapore, and Sri Lanka all withdrew from the festival.

== Location ==
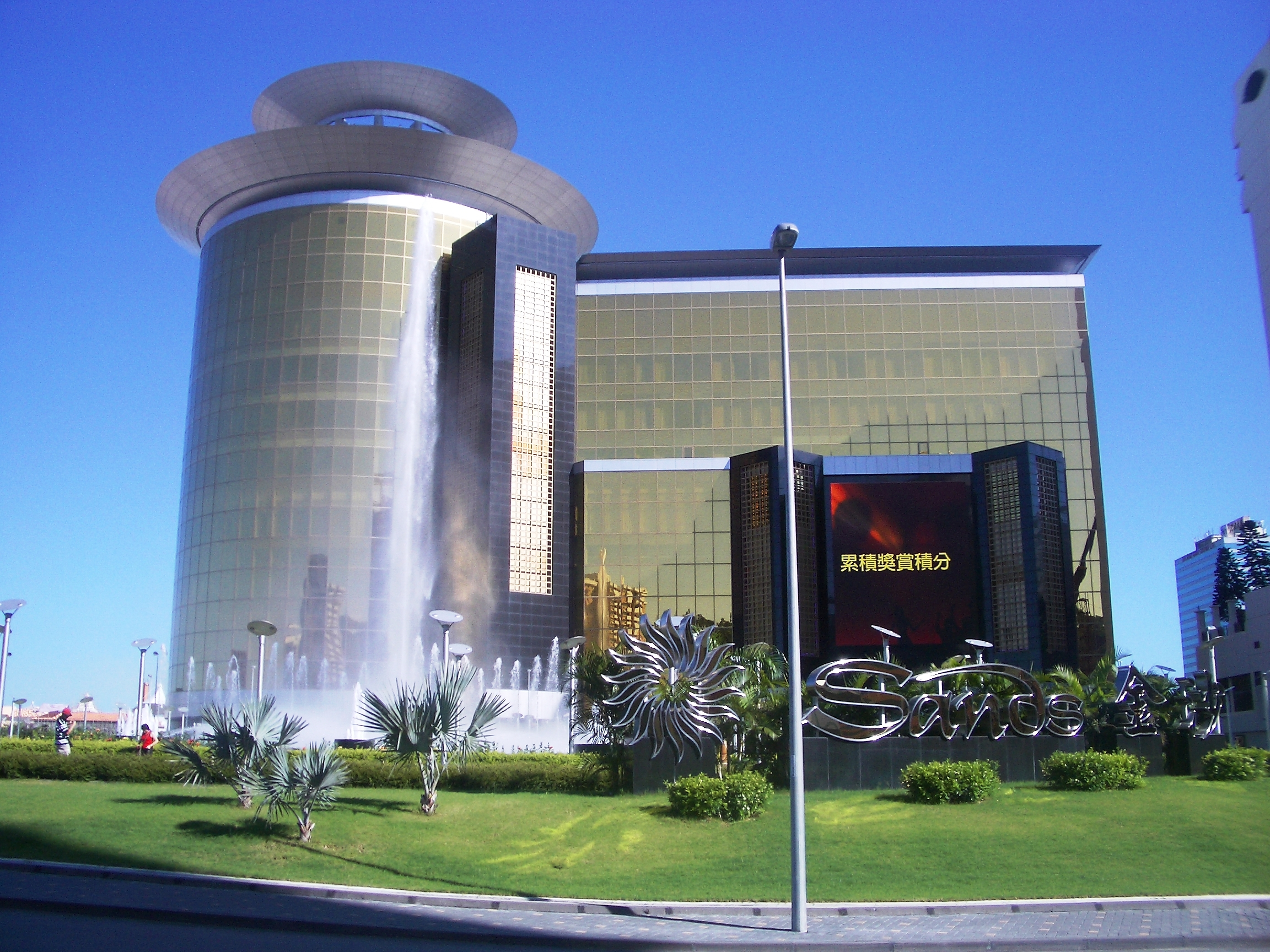
Sands Macao is the venue for ABU TV Song Festival 2014

Macau is one of two Special Administrative Regions of the People's Republic of China with the other being Hong Kong. It lies on the western side of the Pearl River Delta across from Hong Kong to the east, bordered by Guangdong Province to the north and facing the South China Sea to the east and south . It has the population of 607,500 people living in an area of 29.5 km^{2}, making Macau the most densely populated state in the world. Macau was administered by Portugal from the mid-16th century until late 1999 when sovereignty was transferred back to China under the Sino-Portuguese Joint Declaration.

Initially, the 1800-seated Venetian Theatre was chosen to be the venue for the 2014 edition. The venue was later changed to Sands Theatre, part of Sands Macao complex. The Sands Macao is a casino located in Macau Peninsula, of the host city; and is owned and operated by the Las Vegas Sands Corporation. It comprises a 229,000 square feet (21,300 m^{2}) casino, and a 289-suite hotel. The Theatre itself which will host the festival, has a seating capacity of 660, making it a much smaller venue than the initially chosen Venetian Theatre.

=== Host broadcaster ===
Teledifusao de Macau, commonly known as TDM, will be the host broadcaster for the festival on 25 October 2014.

== Format ==
The ABU TV Song Festival celebrates the popular music culture by showcasing high-profile musical acts from each of the participating ABU broadcasting members, in a non-competitive manner.

== Participating countries ==
The number of participating countries for the 2014 was limited to fifteen with each country allowed to only send one act. Twelve countries were later confirmed to participate in the edition.

Country	Artist	Song	Language
Australia	Dami Im	Living Dangerously	English
Brunei	Juan Madial	Hear me	Malay
Indonesia	Tere Cia	Dimana Hatimu	Indonesian
Hong Kong	Frederick Cheng (鄭俊弘)	Xióngmao (熊貓)	Cantonese
Japan	Sekai no Owari (世界の終わり)	Dragon Night	Japanese, English
South Korea	Girl's Day	Something (썸씽)	Korean, English
Macau (host)	Blademark (刃記)	Heartcore (心態硬)	Cantonese, English
Maldives	Mooshan	Rannamaari	Dhivehi
Thailand	Jetrin Wattanasin	7th Heaven	English
China China	Bibi Zhou (周笔畅)	I Miss U Missing Me	English
Turkey	MaNga	Fazla Aşkı Olan Var Mı?	Turkish
Vietnam	Ngọc Anh	Xuân vẫn sang diệu kì	Vietnamese

== International broadcasts ==
Each participating country was invited to broadcast the event across their respective networks and provide commentary in the native languages to add insight and description to the shows.

- Australia – Special Broadcasting Service (SBS Two)
- Brunei – Radio Televisyen Brunei (RTB)
- China – China Central Television (CCTV)
- Hong Kong – Television Broadcasts Limited (TVB)
- Indonesia – Televisi Republik Indonesia (TVRI)
- Japan – Japan Broadcasting Corporation (NHK) (11 November 2014)
- Macau (host) – Teledifusão de Macau (TDM) (25 October 2014; live)
- Maldives – Island Broadcasting Pvt Ltd (IBC)
- South Korea – Korean Broadcasting System (KBS) (12 December 2014)
- Thailand – National Broadcasting Services of Thailand (NBT)
- Turkey – Turkish Radio and Television Corporation (TRT)
- Vietnam – Vietnam Television (VTV)

== Other countries ==
=== Not participating ===
- Malaysia – It was announced in June 2014 that the Malaysian national broadcaster Radio Televisyen Malaysia (RTM) would be taking a year break from the festival.
- New Zealand – Television New Zealand (TVNZ) confirmed on 5 June 2014 that they have no intention to take part.
- Philippines – People's Television Network (PTV) stated that they would not debut at the 2014 contest in Macau.
- Turkmenistan – In February 2014 the ABU met with a delegation from the Turkmenistan national broadcaster Turkmen Television (TTV), with discussions regarding débuts at both the TV and Radio Song Festivals in the near future.

Five countries do not appear on the final participation list, and their reasons for withdrawal is unknown; these include:

- Afghanistan
- Kyrgyzstan
- Iran
- Singapore
- Sri Lanka
