= KBS Hall =

Concert hall in Seoul, South Korea

Coordinates: 37.525954°N 126.915221°E

- Interactive map of KBS Hall
- Location: Yeouido, Seoul, South Korea
- Owner: Korean Broadcasting System
- Seating type: Reserved
- Capacity: 1,824
- Type: concert hall

Construction
- Built: 30 April 1990
- Opened: 7 September 1991

Website
- KBS Hall

KBS Hall (Korean: KBS홀) is a concert hall in the Korean Broadcasting System headquarters located in Yeouido, Seoul in South Korea.

== Events ==
2012

- ABU TV Song Festival 2012 – October 14

2018

- Astro: The 2nd ASTROAD to Seoul [STAR LIGHT] – December 22 to 23

2022

- Golden Child: 2022 Golden Child Concert - Play – February 5 to 6
- WEi: 2022 WEi Concert [First Love] – April 16 to 17
- Fromis 9: 2022 fromis_9 1st Concert <Love From.> – September 30 and October 1 to 2

2023

- Melanie Martinez: Portals Tour – January 21
- Nightwish: Human. :II: Nature. World Tour – January 23
- Itzy: ITZY The 2nd Fan Meeting "ITZY, MIDZY, Let's Fly! To Wonder World" – February 19
- 2023 League of Legends World Championship (Swiss Stage) – October 19 to 29
