= Asia-Pacific Broadcasting Union =

Multinational broadcasting non-profit

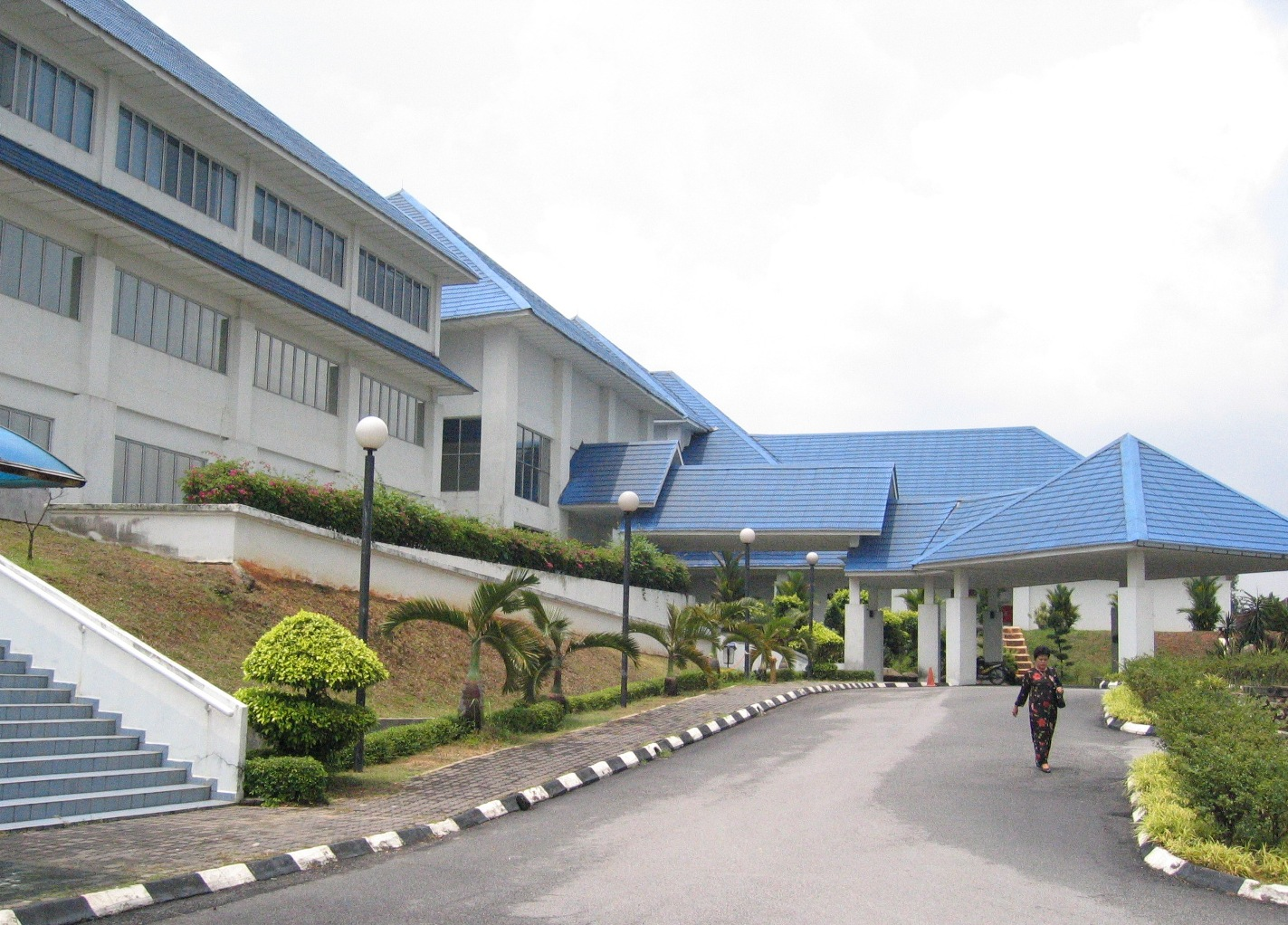
- ABU headquarters in Angkasapuri, Kuala Lumpur
- Abbreviation: ABU
- Formation: 1 July 1964; 62 years ago
- Type: Union of broadcasting organisations
- Headquarters: 2nd Floor, IPPTAR Building, Angkasapuri, 50614 Kuala Lumpur, Malaysia
- Members: 288 members; (from 57 countries and regions)
- Official language: English
- President: Mehmet Zahid Sobacı
- Website: www.abu.org.my

The Asia-Pacific Broadcasting Union (ABU), formed in 1964, is a non-profit, professional association of broadcasting organisations. It currently has over 280 members in 57 countries and regions, reaching a potential audience of about 3 billion people. The ABU's role is to help the development of broadcasting in the Asia-Pacific region and to promote the collective interests of its members. The ABU covers an area stretching from Turkey in the west to Samoa in the east, and from Mongolia in the north to New Zealand in the south. Its secretariat is located in Angkasapuri, Kuala Lumpur, Malaysia, its secretary-general, currently Dr Javad Mottaghi.

One of the ABU's activities is Asiavision, a daily exchange of news feeds by satellite among television stations in 20 countries in Asia. The ABU also negotiates coverage rights to major sports events for its members collectively, and carries out a wide range of activities in the programme and technical areas. The ABU provides a forum for promoting the collective interests of television and radio broadcasters, and encourages regional and international co-operation between broadcasters.

Full members must be national free-to-air broadcasters in the Asia-Pacific region, but there is an associate membership category that is open to provincial broadcasters, subscription broadcasters and national broadcasters in other parts of the world, and an affiliate category that is open to organisations connected to broadcasting.

== Overview ==
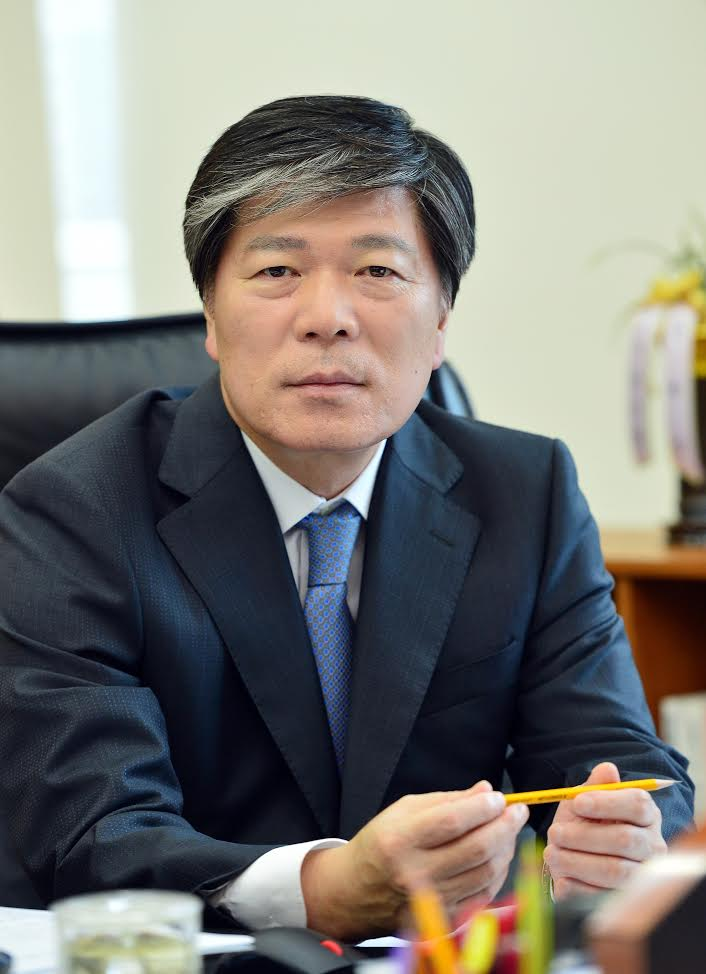
ABU former President Cho Dae-hyun

The ABU's activities include:

- a daily satellite TV news exchange (Asiavision)
- co-production and exchange of programmes
- negotiating rights for major sports events and organising coverage
- technical, programming and management consultancy services
- advising members on copyright and legal matters
- rights-free content acquisition for developing countries
- representing members in international forums
- international frequency planning and coordination
- organising seminars, workshops and training courses
- annual competition for radio and television programmes (ABU Prizes)
- a robot competition for engineering students (Robocon)
- publication of ABU News and Technical Review
- ABU Popular Song Contest (1985–1987)
- ABU Golden Kite World Song Festival (1989–1991)
- ABU TV and Radio Song Festivals (2012)

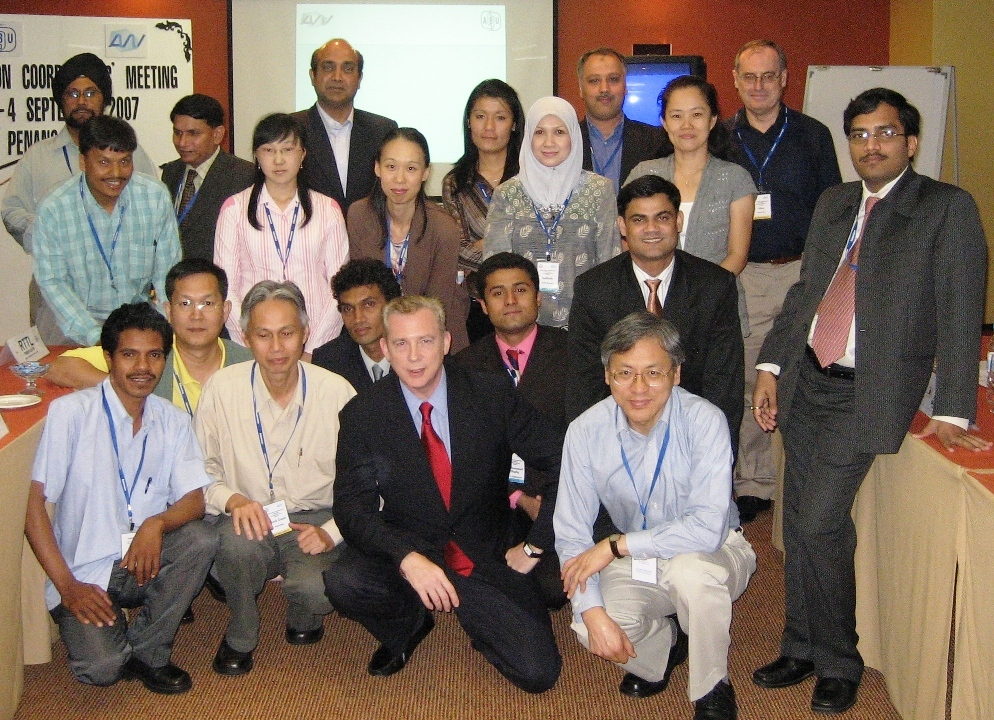
Journalists from ABU member organisations

The ABU works closely with the regional broadcasting. in other parts of the world on matters of common concern, and with many other international organisations, to exchange information on the latest developments in broadcasting, undertake activities to improve the skills and technologies of its members, and encourage harmonisation of operating and technical broadcasting standards and systems in the region. The ABU is funded primarily by annual subscriptions from members. The Union has an elected President and three Vice-Presidents, who serve three-year terms. The current President is Yoshinori Imai of NHK-Japan.

The ABU Secretariat is located in Angkasapuri, Kuala Lumpur, Malaysia. It has over 30 staff, of whom 12 are broadcast professionals recruited from among the ABU members within the region. The head of the Secretariat is the Secretary-General, who is appointed by the General Assembly. The current Secretary-General is Dr. Javad Mottaghi. The Asia-Pacific region is defined in the ABU statutes as countries within areas of Asia and the Pacific that lie substantially between the longitudes of 30 degrees east and 170 degrees west. On the map, this region stretches from Turkey in the west, to Samoa in the east, and from Russia in the north, to New Zealand in the south. All of the ABU's full members operate in this region.

Most of the ABU's associate members are European and North American broadcasters, many of whom have operations in Asia, and pay-TV and cable operators in the Asia-Pacific. Its affiliate members include satellite providers, telcos, production companies, equipment vendors and regulators. The ABU is the third largest of the world's eight broadcasting unions, but covers the largest geographic area of the world.

== Membership ==
A number of different membership types are available to national broadcasters and national broadcasting organisations. These include full, additional full, associate, affiliate and institutional memberships.

=== Full members ===
- Below is a list of full members of the ABU. These are members who are independent nations within the ABU broadcasting region, and consist of two members per country. Broadcasters have the option to change between full and additional full membership.

Country	Broadcasting organisation	National script/Native Name	Abbr.
Afghanistan	Radio Television Afghanistan	رادیو تلویزیون ملی افغانستان (Dari); د افغانستان ملي راډيو تلويزون (Pashto)	RTA
Australia	Australian Broadcasting Corporation	Australian Broadcasting Corporation	ABC
Azerbaijan	Ictimai	İctimai Televiziya və Radio Yayımları Şirkəti	İCTI/İTV
Bangladesh	Bangladesh Betar	বাংলাদেশ বেতার	BB
Bangladesh	Bangladesh Television	বাংলাদেশ টেলিভিশন	BTV
Bhutan	Bhutan Broadcasting Service	འབྲུག་རྒྱང་བསྒྲགས་ལས་འཛིན	BBS
Brunei Darussalam	Radio Television Brunei	Radio Television Brunei; Radio Televisyen Brunei (Malay)	RTB
Cambodia	National Television of Cambodia	ទូរទស្សន៍ជាតិកម្ពុជា	TVK
China	China Media Group	中央广播电视总台	CMG
China	National Radio and Television Administration	国家广播电视总局	NRTA
Egypt	National Media Authority	الهيئة الوطنية للإعلام	NMA
Fiji	Fiji Television	Fiji Television	FTV
India	All India Radio	आकाशवाणी	AIR
India	Doordarshan	दूरदर्शन	DD
Indonesia	Radio of the Republic of Indonesia	Radio Republik Indonesia	RRI
Indonesia	Television of the Republic of Indonesia	Televisi Republik Indonesia	TVRI
Iran	Islamic Republic of Iran Broadcasting	صدا و سيمای جمهوری اسلامی ايران	IRIB
Japan	Nippon Hōsō Kyōkai	日本放送協会	NHK
Japan	TBS Holdings	TBSホールディングス	TBS
Jordan	Jordan Radio and Television Corporation	مؤسسة الإذاعة والتلفزيون الأردني	JRTV
Kazakhstan	Khabar Agency	Хабар Агенттігі (Kazakh); Агентство Хабар (Russian)	KA
Kiribati	Broadcasting and Publications Authority	Broadcasting and Publications Authority	BPA
Kyrgyzstan	Kyrgyz Public Radio and Television Corporation	Кыргыз Республикасынын Коомдук телерадиоберүү корпорациясы (Kyrgyz); Общественная телерадиовещательная корпорация Кыргызской Республики (Russian)	KTRK
Laos	Lao National Radio	ວິທະຍຸກະຈາຍສຽງແຫ່ງຊາດລາວ	LNR
Laos	Lao National Television	ສະຖານີໂທລະພາບແຫ່ງຊາດລາວ	LNTV
Malaysia	Radio Television of Malaysia	Radio Televisyen Malaysia	RTM
Maldives	Public Service Media	ޕަބްލިކް ސަރވިސް މީޑިއާ	PSM
Mongolia	Mongolian National Broadcaster	Монголын Үндэсний Олон Нийтийн Телевиз	MNB
Mongolia	TV5	TV5 Телевиз	TV5
Myanmar	Myanmar Radio and Television	မြန်မာ့အသံနှင့်ရုပ်မြင်သံကြား	MRTV
Nepal	Nepal Television	नेपाल टेलिभिजन	NTV
Nepal	Radio Nepal	रेडियो नेपाल	RNE
North Korea	The Radio and Television Broadcasting Committee of the Democratic People's Republic of Korea	조선중앙방송위원회	KRT
New Zealand	Television New Zealand	Television New Zealand; Te Reo Tātaki o Aotearoa (Māori)	TVNZ
Pakistan	Pakistan Broadcasting Corporation	ہیئت پاکستان برائے قومی نشریات	PBC
Pakistan	Pakistan Television	پاكِستان ٹیلی وژن نیٹ ورک	PTV
Papua New Guinea	Media Niugini Limited		MNL
Papua New Guinea	National Broadcasting Corporation of Papua New Guinea	National Broadcasting Corporation of Papua New Guinea	NBC/PNG
Philippines	People's Television Network	People's Television Network; Telebisyon ng Bayan (Filipino)	PTNI/PTV
Philippines	Intercontinental Broadcasting Corporation		IBC
Qatar	Qatar Media Corporation	المؤسسة القطرية للإعلام	QMC
Samoa	Samoa Broadcasting Corporation	Samoa Broadcasting Corporation; Faalapotopotoga Faasalalauga a Samoa (Samoan)	SBC
Saudi Arabia	Saudi Broadcasting Authority	هيئة الإذاعة والتلفزيون السعودية	SBA
Singapore	Media Corporation of Singapore	Media Corporation of Singapore Private Limited 新加坡传媒私人有限公司 (Chinese); Perbadanan Media Singapura Sendirian Berhad (Malay) சிங்கப்பூர் ஊடகம் கூட்டுத்தாபனம் (Tamil)	Mediacorp
South Korea	Korean Broadcasting System	한국방송공사	KBS
South Korea	Munhwa Broadcasting Corporation	문화방송주식회사	MBC
Sri Lanka	Sri Lanka Broadcasting Corporation	ශ්‍රී ලංකා ගුවන් විදුලි සංස්ථාච (Sinhala) இலங்கை ஒலிபரப்புக் கூட்டுத்தாபனம் (Tamil)	SLBC
Sri Lanka	Sri Lanka Rupavahini Corporation	ශ්‍රී ලංකා රූපවාහිනී සංස්ථාව (Sinhala) இலங்கை ரூபவாகினி கூட்டுத்தாபனம் (Tamil)	SLRC
Thailand	National Broadcasting Services of Thailand	สถานีวิทยุกระจายเสียงแห่งประเทศไทย กรมประชาสัมพันธ์ สถานีวิทยุโทรทัศน์แห่งประเทศไทย กรมประชาสัมพันธ์	NBT
Thailand	Television Pool of Thailand	โทรทัศน์รวมการเฉพาะกิจแห่งประเทศไทย	TPT
East Timor	Radio-Television of East Timor	Radio-Televisão Timor Leste (Portuguese); Radio-Televizaun Timor Lorosae (Tetum)	RTTL
Tonga	Tonga Broadcasting Commission	Tonga Broadcasting Commission; Komisoni Fakamafolalea Tonga (Tongan)	TBC
Turkey	Turkish Radio and Television Corporation	Türkiye Radyo ve Televizyon Kurumu	TRT
Turkmenistan	State Committee of Turkmenistan for Television, Radio Programs and Cinematography	Türkmenistanyň Telewideniýe, radiogepleşikler we kinematografiýa baradaky döwlet komiteti	TTV
Uzbekistan	National Television and Radio Company of Uzbekistan	O'zbekiston milliy teleradiokompaniyasi	MTRK
Vanuatu	Vanuatu Broadcasting and Television Corporation	Vanuatu Broadcasting and Television Corporation; Société de Radiodiffusion et Télévision du Vanuatu (French)	VBTC
Vietnam	Voice of Vietnam	Đài Tiếng nói Việt Nam	VOV
Vietnam	Vietnam Television	Đài Truyền hình Việt Nam	VTV

=== Additional full members ===
Countries with Additional Full ABU Membership.

- Below is a list of additional full members of the ABU. These are members who already have 2 full member organisations, and for countries in non-independent area.

Country	Broadcasting organisation	National script/Native Name	Abbr.
Afghanistan	Ariana Radio and Television Network	آريانا تلويزيون	ATN
Afghanistan	Educational Radio and Television	رادیو و تلویزیون آموزشی	ERTV
Afghanistan	Saba Media Organisation	تلویزیون سبا	SMO
Australia	Special Broadcasting Service	Special Broadcasting Service	SBS
Bangladesh	Asian TV	এশিয়ান টিভি	
Bangladesh	Radio Broadcasting FM (Bangladesh) Company Limited	Radio Broadcasting FM (Bangladesh) Co. Ltd.	Radio Today
Bangladesh	Radio Naf		
Bhutan	Centennial Radio 101FM		CR101
Bhutan	Kuzoo FM		KFM
China	Shandong Radio and Television Station		SDRT
China	Shanghai Media Group	上海文化广播影视集团有限公司	SMG
China	Sichuan Radio and Television	四川广播电视台	SRT
Fiji	Fijian Broadcasting Corporation		FBC
Hong Kong	Radio Television Hong Kong	香港電台	RTHK
Hong Kong	Television Broadcasts Limited	電視廣播有限公司	TVB
Indonesia	PT. Media Televisi Indonesia		Metro TV
Indonesia	PT. Digdaya Media Nusantara		Garuda TV
Kazakhstan	Republican Television and Radio Corporation		RTRC
Kiribati	Kiribati Hope Radio		Island Hope
Kiribati	WAVE TV		
Kyrgyzstan	New Broadcasting System		NTS
Lebanon	Radio Liban	اذاعة لبنان	RL
Macau	Macau Television Broadcasting	澳門廣播電視股份有限公司; Teledifusão de Macau (Portuguese)	TDM
Malaysia	Media Prima Berhad		MPB
Malaysia	Sarawak Media Group Sdn Bhd		SMG
Maldives	VMedia Island Broadcasting Company Pvt Ltd		VMedia
Marshall Islands	Radio Marshalls V7AB		
Mongolia	Ekh Oron National TV		
Mongolia	HBS TV LLC Company		NWTV
Mongolia	MONGOLRadio FM 88.3-102.1		MGLRADIO
Mongolia	MN25 Television	25-р Суваг Телевиз	MN25
Mongolia	Mongolian National Educational Channel	Боловсрол Суваг	EduTV
Mongolia	Mongolian Radio and Television Broadcasting Network	Монголын Үндэсний Олон Нийтийн Телевиз	MRTBN
Mongolia	TV9 Television	TV9 Телевиз	TV9
Mongolia	SULD Television, Noyon Suld Co Ltd		SULD TV
Mongolia	United Broadcasting Corporation LLC	Юнайтед Бродкастинг Корпорэйшн ХХК	STAR TV
Myanmar	DVB Multimedia Group	ဒီမိုကရေတစ်မြန်မာ့အသံ	DVB
Nauru	Nauru Media		NM
Nepal	Kantipur Television Network		KTV
Nepal	Radio Sagarmatha		
North Korea	The Radio and Television Broadcasting Committee of the Democratic People’s Republic of Korea	조선민주주의인민공화국 라디오텔레비전방송위원회	KRT
Pakistan	Hum Network Limited		HUM TV
Pakistan	Shalimar Television Network		A-TV/SRBC
Pakistan	Virtual University TV		VTV
Palestine	Palestine Public Broadcasting Commission	هيئة الإذاعة العامة الفلسطينية	PBC
Philippines	Alto Broadcasting System-Chronicle Broadcasting Network		ABS-CBN
Philippines	Bureau of Broadcast Services – Presidential Broadcasting Service	Presidential Broadcasting Service; Pampanguluhang Serbisyong Pambrodkast (Filipino)	PBS
Solomon Islands	Solomon Islands Broadcasting Corporation		SIBC
Solomon Islands	Telekom Television Limited		TTV
South Korea	Korean Educational Broadcasting System	한국교육방송공사	EBS
South Korea	Seoul Broadcasting System	주식회사에스비에스	SBS
Sri Lanka	EAP Holdings	ඊ.ඒ.පී බ්‍රොඩ්කාස්ටිං සමාගම	EAP
Sri Lanka	Independent Television Network Limited	සී/ස ස්වාධීන රූපවාහිනී සේවය	ITN
Sri Lanka	MBC Networks (Pvt) Limited	සී/ස එම්.බී.සී. නෙට්වර්ක්ස් (පෞද්ගලික) සමාගම	MBC
Sri Lanka	MTV Channel (Pvt) Limited	සී/ස එම්.ටී.වී. චැනල් (පෞද්ගලික) සමාගම	MTV
Sri Lanka	Power House Ltd	සී/ස පවර් හවුස් සමාගම	TV Derana
Sri Lanka	VIS Broadcasting (Pvt) Ltd	සී/ස වී.අයි.එස්. බ්‍රොඩ්කාස්ටිං (පෞද්ගලික) සමාගම.	VIS
Thailand	Thai Public Broadcasting Service	องค์การกระจายเสียงและแพร่ภาพสาธารณะแห่งประเทศไทย	Thai PBS
Thailand	The National Assembly Radio and Television Broadcasting Station	สถานีวิทยุกระจายเสียงและวิทยุโทรทัศน์รัฐสภา สำนักงานเลขาธิการสภาผู้แทนราษฎร	Parliament Thai
Tuvalu	Tuvalu Broadcasting Corporation		TVBC
Vietnam	Audio Visual Global Joint Stock Company	Công Ty Cổ Phần Nghe Nhìn Toàn Cầu	AVG

=== Associate members ===
Countries with Associate ABU Membership.

- Below is a list of associate members of the ABU. These are international broadcasters beyond the ABU region, and national broadcasting associations.

Country	Broadcasting organisation	National script/Native Name	Abbr.
Albania	Albanian Radio-Television	Radio Televizioni Shqiptar	RTSH
Australia	Commercial Radio Australia Limited	Commercial Radio Australia Limited	CRA
Belarus	National State TV and Radio Company of the Republic of Belarus	Нацыянальная дзяржаўная тэлерадыёкампанія Рэспублікі Беларусь	BTRC
Fiji	Walesi Limited	Walesi Limited	Walesi Ltd
France	Group of French EBU Broadcasters: France Télévisions (FTV) (France 2, France 3, France 4, France 5 and Réseau France Outre-mer); Radio France (RF); France Médias Monde (FMM) (RFI, France 24, Monte Carlo Doualiya)	Groupement des Radiodiffuseurs français de l'UER	GRF
Germany	The Working Group of Public Broadcasters in the Federal Republic of Germany: Bavarian Broadcasting (BR); Hessian Broadcasting (HR); Central German Broadcasting (MDR); Northern German Broadcasting (NDR); Radio Bremen (RB); Berlin-Brandenburg Broadcasting (RBB); Saarland Broadcasting (SR); Southwest Broadcasting (SWR); West German Broadcasting (WDR); German Wave (DW); Radio Germany (DLR)	Arbeitsgemeinschaft der öffentlich-rechtlichen Rundfunkanstalten der Bundesrepublik Deutschland (ARD): Bayerischer Rundfunk (BR); Hessischer Rundfunk (HR); Mitteldeutscher Rundfunk (MDR); Norddeutscher Rundfunk (NDR); Radio Bremen (RB); Rundfunk Berlin-Brandenburg (RBB); Saarländischer Rundfunk (SR); Südwestrundfunk (SWR); Westdeutscher Rundfunk (WDR); Deutsche Welle (DW); Deutschlandradio (DLR)	ARD
Germany	Second German Television	Zweites Deutsches Fernsehen	ZDF
Hong Kong	CNN International Asia Pacific		CNN
Hong Kong	Phoenix Television	鳳凰衛視控股有限公司	Phoenix TV
Hungary	Hungarian Media Group: Media Support and Asset Management Fund (MTVA); Duna Media Service Provider	Médiaszolgáltatás-támogató és Vagyonkezelő Alap/Duna Média	HMG
Indonesia	Association of Indonesian Private Broadcasting Radio	Persatuan Radio Siaran Swasta Nasional Indonesia	PRSSNI
Indonesia	Indonesian Broadcasting Commission	Komisi Penyiaran Indonesia	KPI
Indonesia	Indonesian Private Televisions Association	Asosiasi Televisi Swasta Indonesia	ATVSI
Indonesia	Indonesian National Televisions Association	Asosiasi Televisi Nasional Indonesia	ATVNI
Indonesia	Member of Indonesian Local Television	Anggota Televisi Lokal Indonesia	ATVLI
Indonesia	Indonesian Digital Broadcast Televisions Association	Asosiasi Televisi Siaran Digital Indonesia	ATSDI
Italy	RAI – Radiotelevisione Italiana	Radiotelevisione Italiana Spa	Rai
Japan	National Association of Commercial Broadcasters in Japan	日本民間放送連盟	JBA
Malaysia	ASTRO All Asia Networks plc	ASTRO Malaysia Holdings Berhad	AMHB
Maldives	Island Communication & Entertainment Private Limited		ICE Network
Maldives	Sun Siyam Media		SS Media
Malta	Public Broadcasting Services Ltd.		PBS
Mauritius	Mauritius Broadcasting Corporation	Mauritius Broadcasting Corporation	MBC
Mauritius	Radio Plus Limited	Radio Plus Ltd	
Micronesia	Federated States of Micronesia Broadcasting Association		FSMBA
Mongolia	Eagle Broadcasting Company	Ийгл Телевиз	ETV HD
Mongolia	Supervision Broadcasting Network Television	SBN Телевиз	SBN
Nepal	Association of Community Radio Broadcasters Nepal	सामुदायिक रेडियो प्रसारक संघ नेपाल	ACORAB
Nepal	Broadcast Association of Nepal	नेपाल प्रसारण संघ	BAN
Nepal	Radio Tulsipur	रेडियो तुलसीपुर	
Oman	Public Authority for Radio and TV of Oman	تلفزيون سلطنة عمان	PART
Philippines	Association of Broadcasters of the Philippines	Kapisanan ng mga Brodkaster ng Pilipinas	KBP
Romania	Romanian Radio Broadcasting Company	Societatea Română de Radiodifuziune	ROR
Russia	Alternative Irkutsk Studio of TV		AIST
Russia	Channel One Russia	Первый канал Россия	C1R
Russia	RT		RT
Russia	All-Russia State Television and Radio Broadcasting Company	Всероссийская государственная телевизионная и радиовещательная компания	RTR
Russia	Radio Dom Ostankino: Radio Mayak (MK); Radio Orpheus (OP)		RDO
South Korea	Busan English Broadcasting Foundation	부산영어방송재단	
South Korea	Korea Business News CO. LTD	(주)한국비즈니스뉴스	KBN
South Korea	K-Force Radio Station	케이포스 라디오 방송국	KFRS
South Korea	K-Force Television Station	케이포스 텔레비전 방송국	KFTS
Saudi Arabia	General Commission for Audiovisual Media	الهيئة العامة لتنظيم الإعلام	GCAM
Sudan	Sudan National Public Radio Corporation	الهيئة الوطنية للإذاعة العامة السودانية	Sudan Radio
Thailand	Global One Belt One Road Television	โทรทัศน์ Global One Belt One Road	GOBA
United Kingdom	British Broadcasting Corporation		BBC
United States	Trans World Radio		TWR
United States	Voice of America		VOA

=== Institutional members ===
Countries with ABU Institutional Membership.

Country	Broadcasting organisation	Abbr.
Germany	PRIX JEUNESSE International	Prix Jeunesse
Hong Kong	Asia Video Industry Association	ASIA
Switzerland	Digital Radio Mondiale	DRM
United Kingdom	Association for International Broadcasting	AIB
United Kingdom	International News Safety Institute	INSI
United Kingdom	WorldDAB Forum	WorldDAB
USA	International Academy of Television Arts and Sciences	IATAS
USA	United Nations Department of Public Information	UN-DPI

==== Affiliate Member ====
Countries with Affiliated ABU Membership.

Country	Broadcasting organisation	National script/Native Name	Abbr.
Australia	Australian Film, Television and Radio School		AFTRS
Bangladesh	Bangladesh NGOs Network for Radio and Communication		BNNRC
Bangladesh	Bangladesh Community Radio Association		BCRA
Bangladesh	National Institute of Mass Communication		NIMC
Bangladesh	Pathshala South Asian Media Institute		PSAMI
Cambodia	Agence Kampuchea Press		AKP
Canada	Videoship Enterprises Limited		
China	ADINNO, Inc		ADINNO
China	Communication University of China	中国传媒大学	CUC
China	Research and Training Institute of NRTA China		RTI
Fiji	Pacific Islands News Association		PINA
France	Enensys Technologies		ENENSYS
Germany	Fraunhofer Institute for Integrated Circuits		Fraunhofer IIS
Germany	LS telcom AG		LS telcom
Germany	ORBAN Europe GmbH		ORBAN
Hong Kong	APT Satellite Holdings Limited		APT
Hong Kong	Asia Satellite Telecommunications Company Limited		AsiaSat
Hong Kong	Sony Corporation of Hong Kong Ltd.	Sony Corporation of Hong Kong (Previously called Professional Solutions Asia Pacific Company)	Sony
India	Apalya Technologies		Apalya
India	Broadcast Engineering Consultants India		BECIL
India	Canara Lighting Industries PVT. LTD.		Canara
Indonesia	Infotech Solutions		Infotech
Indonesia	REKAM Indonesia		REKAM
Indonesia	PT MNC Sky Vision Tbk		Indovision
Iran	IRIB University	دانشگاه صدا و سیما	IRIB
Iran	Soroush Multimedia Corporation		SMC
Japan	Broadcasting Satellite System Corporation	放送衛星システム株式会社	B-SAT
Japan	Ikegami Tsushinki	池上通信機株式会社	Ikegami
Japan	Japan International Broadcasting Inc.	日本国際放送株式会社	JIB
Japan	Japan Media Communication Center	日本メディアコミュニケーションセンター	JAMCO
Japan	NHK Enterprises, Inc.		
Japan	NHK Foundation		
Japan	NHK Global Media Services, Inc.		
Japan	NHK Technologies, Inc.		
Japan	TI ComNet International Visual Works		TI ComNet Japan
Jordan	SpaceTech TV Engineering		
Malaysia	Aljazeera International (Malaysia) Sdn Bhd		
Malaysia	Celcom (Malaysia) Sdn Bhd	Celcom Axiata Berhad	CELCOM
Malaysia	Happy Campers Productions SDN BHD		
Malaysia	MEASAT Satellite Systems Sdn Bhd		MEASAT
Malaysia	MYTV Broadcasting Sdn Bhd		MYTV
Malaysia	Shekhinah PR Sdn. Bhd		SPR
Malaysia	Spacelabs Technology Sdn Bhd		Spacelabs
Malaysia	WSL MSC Sdn Bhd		
Maldives	Maldives Broadcasting Commission		MBC
Mauritius	Multi Carrier (Mauritius) Limited		MCML
Nepal	Karnali Integrated Rural Development And Research Centre	कर्णाली एकीकृत ग्रामीण विकास तथा अनुसन्धान केन्द्र	KIRDARC
Norway	Nevion AS		Nevion
Pakistan	Pakistan Electronic Media Regulatory Authority	مقتدرہِ ضابطہِ برقی ذرائع ابلاغ پاکستان	PEMRA
Palestine	Media Development Center / Birzeit University	مركز تطوير الإعلام / جامعة بيرزيت	MDC / BU
Papua New Guinea	National Information & Communications Technology Authority	—	NICTA
Singapore	Bangladesh Broadcast Systems		BBS
Singapore	Benchmark Broadcast Systems (S) Pte Ltd		
Singapore	Dolby Laboratories Inc.		
Singapore	Elevate Broadcast Systems		EB
Singapore	Encompass Digital Media (Asia) Pte Ltd		
Singapore	Eutelsat S.A.		
Singapore	EEVA Productions		
Singapore	Globecast Asia	Globecast Asia Pte Ltd	GCA
Singapore	Infocomm Media Development Authority	资讯通信媒体发展局	IMDA
Singapore	MediaGenix		
Singapore	ST Engineering iDirect		
Singapore	Sport Singapore		SPORTSG
Singapore	Telstra Singapore Pte Ltd		Telstra Global
Singapore	Thinking Tub Media Pte Ltd		TTM
Singapore	Whiteways Systems Pte Ltd		WW
Switzerland	Digital Video Broadcasting		DVB
Switzerland	Swiss Italian University	Università Svizzera Italiana	USI
Thailand	Office of the National Broadcasting and Telecommunications Commission	สำนักงานคณะกรรมการกิจการกระจายเสียง กิจการโทรทัศน์ และกิจการโทรคมนาคมแห่งชาติ	NBTC
Turkey	Radio and Television Broadcasting Professional Association	Radyo Televizyon Yayınları Meslek Birliği	RATEM
United Kingdom	Encompass Digital Media Services Limited		Encompass
United Kingdom	International Association of Broadcasting Manufacturers	International Association of Broadcasting Manufacturers	IABM
United Kingdom	New Media Networks		NMN
United Kingdom	Pebble Beach Systems Limited		
United Kingdom	The Insigths People		TIP
United States	iBiquity Digital Corporation		XPERI
Uzbekistan	National Association of Electronical Mass Media	Elektron ommaviy axborot vositalari milliy assotsiatsiyasi	NAEMM

== Other activities ==
=== Emergency Warning Broadcasting System (EWBS) for the Asia-Pacific region ===
EWBS development work has focused on identifying a suitable country code methodology. This system of codes has now been standardised by ITU-R. The General Assembly in Beijing endorsed the work carried out by the TC and issued an ABU Declaration calling all members to encourage their respective governments to implement an EWBS system.

=== ABU Engineering Excellence Awards ===
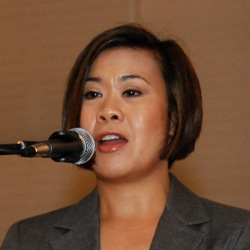
Veronica Pedrosa of Al Jazeera addressing an ABU conference

ABU Engineering Industry Excellence Award and ABU Broadcast Engineering Excellence Award are presented annually to broadcast personalities who have made significant contributions respectively to their organisations and to the industry as a whole. They are selected from nominations made by ABU members and followed by an evaluation process by a panel of judges. The Broadcast Engineering Excellence Award is being sponsored by Broadcast and Professional Pacific Asia Company (BPPA). The award includes a study tour of Sony research facilities.

== Publications ==
The ABU publishes the ABU News magazine while the Technical Department publishes the Technical Review. Both publications are published quarterly. They are sent free to members and non-affiliates and published in print version, downloadable in PDF format through the ABU's Publications area of the ABU's website and on ABU's app on Android. The ABU also publishes books related to broadcasting which is available in print.

== Inter-union activities ==
The World Broadcasting Unions (WBU) brings together eight unions including the ABU. The WBU has a number of specialised forums, including the International Satellite Operations Group (WBU-ISOG) and the Technical Committee (WBU-TC). The ABU is an active member of both.

== See also ==
- ABU events
- African Union of Broadcasting
- Arab States Broadcasting Union
- Asia-Pacific Robot Contest
- Association for International Broadcasting
- Caribbean Broadcasting Union
- Caribbean News Agency
- Commonwealth Broadcasting Association
- Commonwealth Press Union
- European Broadcasting Union
- International Telecommunication Union
- National Association of Broadcasters
- North American Broadcasters Association
- Organización de Telecomunicaciones de Iberoamérica
- Smart Alliance
- World Radio Network
