= List of 2020 Summer Olympics broadcasters =

The 2020 Summer Olympics in Tokyo were televised by a number of broadcasters throughout the world. The 2020 Summer Olympics were postponed to 2021 due to the COVID-19 pandemic. As with previous years, Olympic Broadcasting Services will produce the world feed provided to local broadcasters for use in their coverage. In most regions, broadcast rights to the 2018 and 2020 Olympics were packaged together, but some broadcasters obtained rights to further games as well.

== Broadcasters ==
In Europe, this was the second Olympics under the IOC's exclusive pan-European rights deal with Eurosport, which began at the 2018 Winter Olympics. The rights for the 2020 Games cover almost all of Europe, excluding France due to an existing rights deal that will expire following these Games, and Russia. Eurosport will sub-license coverage to free-to-air networks in each territory, and also air coverage on Discovery Inc.-owned channels in some regions. In the United Kingdom, these will be the last Games whose rights are fully owned by the BBC, although as a condition of a sub-licensing agreement that will carry into the 2022 and 2024 Games, Discovery holds exclusive pay television rights to these Games.

2020 is similarly the final year of France Télévisions' rights in France (similarly to the BBC, it will also sub-license the 2022 and 2024 Games from Eurosport). Canal+ sold its pay television rights in France to Eurosport, citing internal cost-cutting measures.

In Canada, the 2020 Games were shown on CBC/Radio-Canada platforms, Sportsnet, TSN and TLN. In Australia, they were aired by Seven Network. In the Indian subcontinent, they were aired by Sony Pictures Networks India (SPN).

The NBCUniversal networks had the Games in the United States, as part of a US$4.38 billion agreement that began at the 2014 Winter Olympics in Sochi. The United States Olympic & Paralympic Committee asserted that a "right of abatement" clause in the contract was triggered by the delay of the Games to 2021, requiring the IOC to "negotiate in good faith an equitable reduction in the applicable broadcast rights payments" by NBC, with the American corporation being one of the IOC's biggest revenue streams. According to NBCUniversal CEO Jeff Shell, the Tokyo games could be the most profitable Olympics in NBC's history. The Tokyo games were NBC's first Olympics broadcast under current president Susan Rosner Rovner; it would be also be the last due to Rovner's departure in 2023.

Territory	Rights holder	Ref
Afghanistan	ATN	
Albania	RTSH	
Andorra	RTVA	
Antigua and Barbuda	CNS	
Armenia	APMTV	
Asia	Dentsu (Note: Rights in 22 countries in Asia, to be resold to local broadcasters)	
Australia	Seven Network	
Austria	ORF	
Argentina	TVP; DeporTV; TyC Sports	
Azerbaijan	AzTV	
Bangladesh	BTV	
Barbados	CBC	
Bahamas	ZNS	
Belarus	Belteleradio	
Belgium	RTBF; VRT	
Benin	ORTB	
Bhutan	BBS	
Bolivia	Bolivisión	
Bosnia and Herzegovina	BHRT	
Brazil	Grupo Globo; BandSports	
Brunei	RTB	
Bulgaria	BNT	
Burkina Faso	RTB	
Cambodia	Hang Meas	
Cameroon	CRTV	
Canada	Bell Media; CBC/Radio-Canada; Sportsnet; TLN	
Cape Verde	RTC	
Caribbean	International Media Content Ltd.; SportsMax	
Chile	TVN	
China	CCTV; Migu	
Cook Islands	Elijah Communications	
Colombia	Caracol Televisión	
Costa Rica	Repretel	
Croatia	HRT	
Cuba	ICRT	
Cyprus	CyBC	
Czech Republic	ČT	
Democratic Republic of the Congo	RTNC	
Denmark	DR	
Dominican Republic	Antena 7	
East Timor	RTTL	
Ecuador	RTS; TVC	
El Salvador	Canal 12	
Estonia	ERR; Postimees Group	
Ethiopia	ETV	
Europe (Note: except Russia)	Discovery, Inc.; Eurosport	
Fiji	Fiji TV; Mai TV	
Finland	Yle	
France	France Télévisions; Eurosport	
Gabon	RTG	
Georgia	GPB	
Germany	ARD; ZDF	
Ghana	GTV Sports	
Greece	ERT	
Grenada	GBN	
Guatemala	Chapín TV	
Guinea	RTG	
Honduras	VTV	
Hong Kong	DAZN; i-Cable; PCCW; TVB	
Hungary	MTVA	
Iceland	RÚV	
India	Doordarshan	
Indian subcontinent	Sony Pictures Networks	
Indonesia	Emtek; TVRI	
Iran	IRIB	
Ireland	RTÉ	
Israel	Sports Channel	
Italy	RAI	
Ivory Coast	RTI	
Jamaica	TVJ	
Japan	Japan Consortium	
Kazakhstan	Khabar; RTRK	
Kenya	KTN	
Kiribati	Wave TV	
Kosovo	RTK	
Kyrgyzstan	KTRK	
Laos	LNTV	
Latin America (Note: except Brazil)	América Móvil	
Latvia	LTV	
Liechtenstein	SRG SSR	
Lithuania	TV3	
Luxembourg	RTL	
Macau	TDM	
Malawi	MBC	
Malaysia	Astro; RTM; Unifi TV	
Maldives	PSM	
Mali	ORTM	
Mauritius	MBC	
Mexico	Televisa; TV Azteca; Imagen Televisión	
MENA	beIN Sports	
Moldova	TVR	
Mongolia	C1; Eagle TV; Edu TV; ETV; NTV; SBN; Star TV; TM TV; TV5; TV8; TV9; UBS; VTV	
Montenegro	RTCG	
Namibia	NBC	
Nepal	NTV	
Netherlands	NOS	
New Zealand	Sky; TVNZ	
Nicaragua	Canal 10	
Nigeria	NTA	
Niue	BCN	
North Korea	SBS	
North Macedonia	MRT	
Norway	TVNorge	
Oceania (Note: Rights in Cook Islands, Fiji, Kiribati, Marshall Islands, Micronesia, Nauru, Niue, Palau, Samoa, Solomon Islands, Tonga, Tuvalu and Vanuatu.)	Sky	
Pakistan	PTV	
Palau	PNCC	
Papua New Guinea	EM TV	
Paraguay	SNT	
Peru	Grupo ATV	
Philippines	Cignal TV; PLDT	
Poland	TVP	
Portugal	RTP	
Romania	TVR	
Russia	Channel One; Match TV; Telesport; VGTRK	
Saint Kitts and Nevis	The Cable	
Samoa	SBC	
San Marino	RAI	
Serbia	RTS	
Seychelles	SBC	
Singapore	Mediacorp	
Slovakia	RTVS	
Slovenia	RTV	
Solomon Islands	Solomon Telekom	
Spain	RTVE	
South Africa	SABC; SuperSport	
South Korea	KBS; MBC; SBS; Naver; Wavve; AfreecaTV	
Southeast Asia (except for Indonesia and Vietnam)	beIN Sports Asia	
Sri Lanka	Rupavahini	
Sub-Saharan Africa	Infront Sports & Media; SuperSport; TV5Monde	
Suriname	ATV; SCCN	
Sweden	Kanal 5	
Switzerland	SRG SSR	
Taiwan	ELTA Sports; Chunghwa Telecom; EBC; EBC News (Note: EBC News & EBC Financial News 24/7 livestream (including YouTube globally) were blacked out for the Summer Olympics coverage); EBC Financial News; PTS (Note: Over the air and cable broadcast only)	
Tajikistan	TV Varzish	
Tanzania	ZBC2	
Thailand	AIS; GMM25; Plan B; JKN18; PPTV; TPT; NBT; ThaiPBS; True4U	
Togo	TVT	
Trinidad and Tobago	CNC3	
Turkey	TRT	
Uganda	NBS	
Ukraine	Suspilne	
United Kingdom	BBC; Eurosport	
United States	NBCUniversal	
Uruguay	TNU; Tenfield	
Uzbekistan	MTRK	
Venezuela	TVES	
Vietnam	VTV; VTVCab	
Zambia	Muvi TV	
