= List of television stations in East Asia =

This is a list of television stations in East Asia.

== China ==
- CCTV
- CETV
- CWTV
- CGTN

== Hong Kong ==
- HKTVE
- I-CABLE HOY
- RTHK
- TVB

== Japan ==
- Animax
- Fuji TV
- J Sports
- NHK
- NTV
- TBS
- Tokyo MX
- TV Asahi
- TV Tokyo

== Macau ==
- Lotus TV Macau
- Macau Asia Satellite Television
- Teledifusão de Macau

== Mongolia ==
- CTV
- C1
- Channel 25 (Mongolia)
- Eagle News
- Edutainment TV
- Mongol HD TV
- Mongolian News Channel
- NTV
- Sportbox
- Supervision Broadcasting Network
- TM Television
- TV5 (Mongolia)
- TV8 (Mongolia)
- TV9 (Mongolia)
- Ulaanbaatar Broadcasting System

== North Korea ==
- KCTV
- Mansudae TV

== South Korea ==
- EBS
- KBS
- MBC
- SBS
- JTBC
- Channel A
- MBN
- TV Chosun
- YTN

== Taiwan ==
- FTV
- CTV
- CTS
- PTS
- TTV

== See also ==
- Lists of television channels
- List of television stations in Central Asia
- List of television stations in Southeast Asia
- List of television stations in West Asia
