= List of 2022 Winter Olympics broadcasters =

The 2022 Winter Olympics in Beijing was televised by a number of broadcasters throughout the world. As with previous years, Olympic Broadcasting Services produced the world feed provided to local broadcasters for use in their coverage. In most regions, broadcast rights to the 2022 and 2024 Olympics were packaged together, but some broadcasters obtained rights to further games as well.

== Broadcasters ==
In China, domestic rights to these Games are owned by China Media Group (CMG), with live rights being sublicensed by China Mobile's Migu streaming service.

In some countries, broadcast rights to the 2022 Winter Olympics were already agreed upon through existing long-term deals. In France and the United Kingdom, these were the first Games where Eurosport would be the main rightsholder; the BBC sub-licensed a limited amount of coverage on free-to-air television, as part of a deal in which the BBC sold the pay-TV rights to the 2018 and 2020 Games to Eurosport. In January 2022, the BBC announced it would broadcast over 300 hours of free-to-air live coverage, as well as highlights programmes.

In the United States, these Games will once again be broadcast by NBCUniversal properties, as part of its US$7.75 billion contract to air the Olympics through 2032. The scheduling of the Games impacted the U.S. broadcast rights to the Super Bowl—the championship game of the National Football League (NFL), and historically the most-watched television broadcast in the United States annually—as the game's date fell within an ongoing Olympic Games for the first time in its history. Under the NFL's broadcast rights at the time, the rights to the Super Bowl alternated annually between CBS, Fox, and long-time Olympic broadcaster NBC (whose last Super Bowl also fell in a Winter Olympic year, but was held prior to the opening ceremony). To prevent the Games from competing for viewership and advertising sales with Super Bowl LVI—which was scheduled for 13 February 2022 at Los Angeles' SoFi Stadium—CBS and NBC announced in March 2019 that they would invert the rights for Super Bowl LVI and LV (2021), so that both the 2022 Winter Olympics and Super Bowl LVI would be broadcast by NBC. In a break from the established practice of airing premieres or special episodes of entertainment programmes after the Super Bowl to take advantage of its large audience, NBC aired its prime time coverage for Day 10 of the Games immediately following Super Bowl LVI. Furthermore, the NFL's new media rights beginning in 2023 extends the Super Bowl rotation to four networks by adding ABC and ESPN, thus codifying this scenario by giving NBC rights to the Super Bowl in 2026, 2030, and 2034, all of which are Winter Olympic years.

Territory	Rights holder	Ref
Afghanistan	ATN	
Armenia	APMTV	
Andorra	RTVA	
Australia	Seven Network	
Austria	ORF	
Asia	Dentsu (Note: Rights to be sold to local broadcasters)	
Bangladesh	BTV	
Belarus	Belteleradio	
Belgium	RTBF; VRT	
Bhutan	BBS	
Bolivia	Bolivisión	
Bosnia and Herzegovina	BHRT	
Botswana	BTV	
Brazil	Grupo Globo	
Brunei	RTB	
Bulgaria	BNT	
Burkina Faso	RTB	
Cambodia	Hang Meas	
Canada	CBC/Radio-Canada	
Cape Verde	RTC	
Caribbean	Sportsmax	
Chile	TVN	
China	CMG; Migu	
Colombia	Caracol Televisión	
Costa Rica	Repretel	
Croatia	HRT	
Czech Republic	ČT	
Denmark	DR; TV 2	
Dominican Republic	Antena 7	
East Timor	RTTL	
Ecuador	RTS; TVC	
El Salvador	Canal 12	
Estonia	Postimees Group	
Ethiopia	ETV	
Europe	Eurosport (Note: Free-to-air rights to be sold to local broadcasters, except Russia)	
Finland	Yle	
France	France Télévisions	
Georgia	GPB	
Germany	ARD; ZDF	
Ghana	GTV Sports	
Greece	ERT	
Guatemala	Televisión Guatemalteca	
Honduras	VTV	
Hong Kong	TVB; China Mobile; RTHK	
Hungary	MTVA	
Iceland	RÚV	
India	Doordarshan	
Indonesia	TVRI	
Israel	Sports Channel	
Italy	RAI	
Ivory Coast	RTI	
Japan	Japan Consortium	
Kazakhstan	Khabar; RTRK	
Kosovo	RTK	
Kyrgyzstan	KTRK	
Laos	LNTV	
Latin America (Note: Except Brazil)	América Móvil	
Latvia	LTV	
Liechtenstein	SRG SSR	
Lithuania	TV3	
Luxembourg	RTL	
Macau	TDM	
Malawi	MBC	
Malaysia	Astro; RTM; Unifi TV	
Mauritius	MBC	
MENA	beIN Sports	
Moldova	TVR	
Montenegro	RTCG	
Mongolia	C1; Edu TV; ETV; MNB; NTV; TV5; TV9; UBS	
Mozambique	STV	
Namibia	NBC	
Nepal	NTV	
Netherlands	NOS; DPG Media	
Norway	TVNorge	
New Zealand	Sky	
Nicaragua	Canal 10	
Nigeria	Moreplex TV	
North Korea	SBS	
North Macedonia	MRT	
Pacific Islands	Sky	
Pakistan	PTV	
Paraguay	SNT	
Peru	Grupo ATV	
Philippines	Cignal TV	
Poland	TVP	
Portugal	RTP	
Romania	TVR	
Russia	Channel One; Match TV; Telesport; VGTRK	
Samoa	SBC	
Seychelles	SBC	
Switzerland	SRG SSR	
Sweden	Kanal 5	
Serbia	RTS	
Singapore	Mediacorp	
Slovakia	RTVS	
Slovenia	RTV	
South Africa	SABC; SuperSport	
South Korea	SBS; KBS; MBC	
Spain	RTVE	
Sri Lanka	SLRC	
Sub-Saharan Africa	Infront Sports & Media; SuperSport	
Tajikistan	TV Varzish	
Tanzania	Azam TV	
Thailand	AIS; Plan B; Channel 5; T Sports; NBT; PPTV	
Taiwan	Chunghwa Telecom; ELTA; Hami Video; PTS	
Turkey	TRT	
Ukraine	Suspilne	
United Kingdom	BBC; Eurosport	
United States	NBCUniversal	
Uruguay	TNU	
Uzbekistan	MTRK	
Vietnam	VTV (Note: Closing ceremony only)	

== Diplomatic boycott ==
Indian public broadcaster Doordarshan is part of India's diplomatic boycott and will not air live the opening and closing ceremonies of the Games.

== Viewership ==
The 2022 Games confirmed an ongoing trend in U.S. viewership of the Olympics; while television viewership had seen a further decline, they were offset by increases in social media engagement and streaming viewership of the Games. Similar trends were seen in Europe, where amidst falling TV ratings Eurosport reported an eight-fold increase in streaming viewership on its platforms and Discovery+ over Pyeongchang 2018.
