= List of 2012 Summer Olympics broadcasters =

This is a list of Olympic broadcasters of the 2012 Summer Olympics. The games in London, together with the 2012 Summer Paralympics were broadcast around the world, with Olympic Broadcasting Services (OBS), an agency of the International Olympic Committee, serving as the host broadcaster.

The home nation broadcaster was the BBC, which broadcast up to 5,000 hours of the competition and other material using over 27 channels including the red button, SKY, Freeview, Freesat and online. BBC paid £60 million for the rights of the broadcasting.

== Broadcasters ==
NBCUniversal retained the rights in the United States, where they paid 32% higher than the 2008 edition broadcasting fee to International Olympic Committee (IOC), which is US$1.181 billion compared to 2008's US$894 million. USA Today also indicated that the broadcasting fee increased almost 100% over the past four decades. In Australia, Nine Network and Foxtel held the rights to broadcast the event, ending Seven Network's streak of five straight Olympic broadcasts since Barcelona 1992.

Two major cable television networks, ESPN and Eurosport, broadcast the Games in Asia, South America (except Brazil) and Europe. Eurosport broadcast the Games throughout the continent of Europe for 746 millions dollar (with Vancouver 2010), while ESPN fed nine countries in South America and 22 countries in Asia. In some cases, one television station indirectly acquired the rights from IOC, namely CVM TV of Jamaica, which bought the rights from the International Media Content Limited (IMC) which has rights throughout the Caribbean.

The Games also saw two neighbouring regions sharing one television broadcaster apart from pay-TV. China Central Television (CCTV), which is known in Mainland China also provided a feed in Macau. For the first time, South Korea and North Korea shared one television provider, despite the two countries continuing to have diplomatic tensions.

The Games were broadcast in 3D around the world. IOC announced on 6 June 2012 that they would provide the livestream of the Games via YouTube for 64 territories across Asia and Africa.

Territory	Broadcaster	Ref
Afghanistan	RTA; Saba TV	
Albania	RTSH	
Algeria	ENTV	
Angola	TPA; Maximo	
Argentina	TV Pública Digital; TyC	
Asia	Asia-Pacific Broadcasting Union; ESPN Asia; AsiaSat	
Australia	Nine Network; Foxtel; 2GB; ABC	
Austria	ORF	
Azerbaijan	İTV	
Bahamas	ZNS; Cable Bahamas Limited	
Bahrain	IAA	
Barbados	CBC	
Belarus	Belteleradio	
Belgium	VRT; RTBF	
Belize	Channel 7	
Benin	ORTB	
Bermuda	Bermuda Cablevision	
Bolivia	Bolivisión	
Bosnia and Herzegovina	BHRT; RTRS	
Brazil	BandSports; ESPN Brasil; Rede Record; SporTV	
British Virgin Islands	CBN	
Bulgaria	BNT	
Burundi	RTNB	
Cambodia	CTN; TVK	
Cameroon	CRTV	
Canada	Canada's Olympic Broadcast Media Consortium^{1}	
Caribbean	International Media Content Limited; SportsMax	
Central African Republic	RTC	
Chile	Canal 13; TVN	
China	CCTV; BTV; GDTV; SMG	
Colombia	Caracol TV	
Cook Islands	CITV	
Costa Rica	Repretel	
Croatia	HRT; SPTV	
Cuba	ICRT	
Cyprus	CyBC	
Czech Republic	Czech Television	
Democratic Republic of the Congo	RTNC	
Denmark	DR; TV 2	
Dominica	SAT Telecoms	
Dominican Republic	Grupo Corripio	
East Timor	TVTL	
Ecuador	Latele; RTS	
Egypt	ERTU	
El Salvador	Telecorporación Salvadoreña	
Estonia	ERR	
Ethiopia	ETV	
Europe	Eurosport; EBU	
Fiji	Fiji Television; Sky Pacific	
Finland	Yle	
France	France Télévisions	
Gabon	RTG	
Gambia	GRTS	
Georgia	GPB	
Germany	ARD; ZDF	
Ghana	GTV	
Greece	ERT	
Grenada	Grenada Broadcasting Network	
Guatemala	Televisión Guatemalteca	
Guinea	RTG	
Guyana	National Communications Network	
Hong Kong	i-Cable; aTV; TVB	
Hungary	Duna TV; MTV	
Iceland	RÚV	
India	Doordarshan	
Indonesia	TVRI; RCTI	
Iran	GEM TV Group	
Ireland	RTÉ	
Israel	IBA	
Italy	RAI; Sky Italia	
Ivory Coast	RTI	
Jamaica	CVM Television; TVJ	
Japan	Japan Consortium^{2}; NOTTV^{3}	
Jordan	JTV	
Kazakhstan	El Arna; Khabar	
Kenya	KBC	
Latin America	Grupo Albavisión^{4}; Terra Networks^{5}	
Laos	Lao National Television	
Latvia	Latvian Television	
Lithuania	LRT	
Luxembourg	RTL Télé Lëtzebuerg	
Macau	TDM; CCTV	
Macedonia	MRT	
Malaysia	RTM	
Mali	ORTM	
Malta	TVM	
Mauritania	TVM	
Mauritius	MBC	
Mexico	Televisa; TV Azteca	
Middle East	Arab States Broadcasting Union; OSN	
Moldova	TeleRadio-Moldova	
Mongolia	EduTV; Channel 25; MNB; NTV; SBN; TV5; UBS	
Montenegro	RTCG	
Montserrat	Ptv7	
Morocco	Arryadia	
Mozambique	TVM	
Myanmar	MRTV	
Namibia	NBC; Maximo	
Nepal	NTV Plus	
Netherlands	NOS	
New Zealand	Prime; SKY TV	
Nicaragua	Ratensa	
Niger	TV Tenere	
Nigeria	NOC; NTA; FRCN; AIT; Maximo	
Niue	BCN	
North Africa	OSN	
North Korea	SBS; Korean Central Television	
Norway	NRK; Viasat	
Pakistan	PTV	
Panama	Corporación Medcom; TVMax	
Paraguay	Paravisión; SNT Cerro Corá	
Peru	América Televisión	
Philippines	TV5; IBC; Solar Entertainment	
Poland	TVP; N	
Portugal	RTP	
Puerto Rico	Puerto Rico TV	
Romania	TVR; Dolce	
Russia	Pervyi Kanal; VGTRK; NTV Plus	
Saint Kitts and Nevis	ZIZ	
Samoa	SBC	
Senegal	RTS	
Serbia	RTS	
Seychelles	SBC	
Singapore	MediaCorp; mio TV	
Slovakia	RTVS	
Slovenia	RTVSLO	
Solomon Islands	One Television	
South Africa	SABC; SuperSport; Maximo	
South America	ESPN Latin America^{7}; DirecTV	
South Korea	SBS; KBS; MBC	
Spain	RTVE	
Sri Lanka	SLRC; MTV; MBC	
Sub-Saharan Africa	Octagon; SABC; SuperSport	
Sudan	SSTV	
Suriname	STVS	
Sweden	SVT	
Switzerland	SRG SSR	
Taiwan	ELTA; PTS; CTV; CTS; FTV; TTV	
Thailand	TPT^{8}; TrueVisions	
Togo	TVT	
Tonga	Television Tonga	
Trinidad and Tobago	CCN TV6	
Tunisia	Tunisia TV 1	
Turkey	TRT	
Ukraine	NTKU	
United Arab Emirates	Abu Dhabi Sports Channel	
United Kingdom	BBC	
United States	NBCUniversal; Dial Global	
Uruguay	Tenfield; Televisión Nacional	
Venezuela	teleSUR; TVes; VTV	
Vietnam	VTV	
Zambia	Muvi TV	
Zimbabwe	ZBC	

Notes
^1 – Consortium formed by Bell Media, V, Rogers Media and Asian Television Network, with the broadcasts occurring on several properties of these companies (i.e.: CTV is owned by Bell Media and was broadcast the games on FTA English-language television).
^2 – It is a joint venture of NHK, Fuji Television, TBS TV, TV Asahi, TV Tokyo, NTV, and JAITS. Its functions are the same as the Canada's Olympic Broadcast Media Consortium.
^3 – Coverage on all smartphones across Japan, in cooperation with the Japan Consortium.
^4 – Coverage across Bolivia, Costa Rica, Dominican Republic, Ecuador, El Salvador, Guatemala, Honduras, Nicaragua, Paraguay and Uruguay.
^5 – Internet and mobile phone coverage across the Latin America.
^7 – Coverage across Argentina, Bolivia, Chile, Colombia, Ecuador, Paraguay, Peru, Uruguay and Venezuela.
^8 – It is a joint venture of Channel 3, TV5, Channel 7, Modernine TV, and NBT.

== See also ==
- Olympics on television
- List of 2008 Summer Olympics broadcasters
