= List of 2008 Summer Olympics broadcasters =

This is a list of Olympic broadcasters of the 2008 Summer Olympics. These games were the first to be produced and broadcast entirely in high-definition television. In their bid for the Olympic games in 2001, Beijing confirmed to the olympic evaluation commission "that there would be no restrictions on media reporting and movement of journalists up to and including the Olympic Games."

The host broadcasting organization of the games was BOB (Beijing Olympic Broadcasting). The home nation broadcasters are CCTV, CETV. CNR and other broadcasting stations in China with other languages which are broadcasting all competitions, events, galas and ceremonies with the Paralympics.

== Broadcasters ==
In Canada the public network CBC/Radio-Canada and cable networks TSN and RDS broadcast its final games before a private consortium involving CTV/Rogers/TQS takes over for the 2010 Winter Olympics, which will be happening within Canadian borders, in Vancouver. In Australia the Seven Network broadcast its final games before the Nine Network and Pay-TV operator Foxtel took over from the 2010 Winter Olympics and beyond.

The IOC awarded Australia's Seven Network the 'Golden Rings' award for "Best Olympic Programme". The award is given for the best overall Olympic coverage.

Territory	Rights holder	HDTV	Ref.
MENA	Arab States Broadcasting Union	Aljazeera Sport HD	
Albania	RTSH		
Argentina	Canal 7 (All events), TyC Sports (all events)		
Armenia	ARMTV		
Australia	Television broadcast: Seven Network; SBS; Radio broadcast: 2GB SEN 5AA 6IX 2CC KOFM	Seven HD	
Austria	ORF	ORF 1 HD	
Belarus	Belteleradiocompany: TV-First and LAD		
Belgium	VRT, RTBF	VRT: één HD	
Bolivia	Unitel, Red Uno, TyC Sports		
Bosnia and Herzegovina	BHRT		
Brazil	Free-to-air television broadcast: Rede Globo; Rede Bandeirantes; Cable and Satellite television broadcast: Sportv (Sportv 2 | Sportv 3 | Sportv 4 | Sportv +); Band Sports; ESPN; ESPN Brasil; Internet and Cellphone broadcast: Terra Networks; Radio broadcast: Rádio Gaúcha; Rádio CBN; Rádio Globo; Rádio Jovem Pan; Rádio Eldorado	Free-to-air television broadcast: Rede Globo; Rede Bandeirantes; Cable and Satellite television broadcast: Sportv HD; Globosat HD	
Brunei	Kristal-Astro, Radio Television Brunei		
Bulgaria	BNT		
Cambodia	National Television of Cambodia		
Canada	CBC Television, Radio-Canada, bold, TSN, RDS	CBC HD, Radio-Canada HD, TSN HD, RDS HD	
Chile	TVN, Canal 13; webcast on Terra Networks		
China	China Central Television, China Radio International (CRI) and China National Radio (CNR)	CCTV-HD	
Colombia	Free-to-air: Señal Colombia, Caracol, RCN; Webcast: Terra Networks		
Croatia	HRT		
Czech Republic	Czech Television		
Denmark	DR, TV 2		
Dominican Republic	Television Centro		
Estonia	Eesti Televisioon		
European Union	Eurosport		
Finland	Yle, Urheilukanava	YLE Peking HD, Eurosport HD & Saunalahti	
France	France Télévisions		
Georgia	GPB		
Germany	ARD, ZDF	Das Erste HD; ZDF HD	
Greece	ERT		
Hong Kong	ATV, TVB	ATV HD; TVB HD	
Hungary	MTV	m1 HD, m2 HD	
Iceland	RUV		
India	Doordarshan, Zee TV		
Indonesia	TVRI, AORA		
Iran	IRIB TV3		
Ireland	RTÉ		
Israel	TV broadcast: Channel 1 Sport 5 (Including Sport 5+, Sport5+ Live and Sport5+ Gold); Webcast: sport5.co.il Cellphone broadcast: Pelephone, Orange and Cellcom	Cable and satellite: Sport 5HD	
Italy	RAI		
Japan	Japan Consortium (NHK, Nippon Television, Fuji Television, TV Asahi, TV Tokyo, Tokyo Broadcasting System)		
Laos	Lao National Television, Lao National Radio		
Latvia	Latvijas Televīzija		
Lithuania	LRT		
Macau	TDM (Power by China Central Television)	TDM HD	
Malaysia	Astro, Radio Televisyen Malaysia		
Mexico	Televisa; TV Azteca; TVC Deportes	Televisa HD; TV Azteca HD	
Moldova	TRM		
Mongolia	MNB, UBS, Channel 25, TV5, TV9, NTV		
Montenegro	RTCG		
Myanmar	Myanmar Radio and Television		
Netherlands	NPO/NOS	Nederland 1 HD	
New Zealand	TVNZ		
Norway	NRK		
Pakistan	Geo Super		
Philippines	Television Cable: Solar Sports; Basketball TV; Jack TV; SOLAR All Access 1 and 2(PPV); Free-to-air: C/S; ETC; 2nd Avenue		
Poland	Telewizja Polska		
Portugal	RTP		
Puerto Rico	Telemundo de Puerto Rico		
Romania	TVR, Telesport		
Russia	VGTRK: Russia, Russia 1, Russia 2 and Sport1 and news info on Vesti, Channel One, NTV Plus	NTV Plus	
Serbia	RTS		
Singapore	StarHub TV, Singtel and Mediacorp		
Slovakia	STV		
Slovenia	RTV Slovenija	RTV Slovenija HD Test	
South Africa	SABC, SuperSport		
South Korea	KBS, MBC and SBS		
Spain	RTVE		
Sri Lanka	Rupavahini		
Sweden	SVT1, SVT24, Peking+, SRP4 and SR's webcasts. Also broadcast on the web through SVT Play and to cellphones by Tele2.	SVT HD	
Switzerland	SF TSR TSI	HD Suisse	
Taiwan	CTV, CTS, FTV, TTV	PTS HIHD	
Thailand	TPT (NBT, MCOT, Channel 3, RTA TV5, BBTV Channel 7, TPBS), TrueVisions		
Turkey	TRT		
Ukraine	First National		
United Kingdom	BBC		
United States	NBCUniversal; See also: 2008 Summer Olympics on NBC		
Venezuela	Venevisión, Meridiano TV, TVES		
Vietnam	Vietnam Television, Ho Chi Minh City Television, Hanoi Radio Television and Vietnam Multimedia Corporation		

== See also ==
- Olympics on television
- List of 2012 Summer Olympics broadcasters
