= List of 2014 Winter Olympics broadcasters =

The 2014 Winter Olympics in Sochi were televised by a number of broadcasters throughout the world. As with previous years, Olympic Broadcasting Services produced the world feed provided to local broadcasters for use in their coverage. In most regions, broadcast rights to the 2014 and 2016 Olympics were packaged together, but some broadcasters obtained rights to further games as well, while in Australia, the 2014 Games were offered individually after all three major networks were unable to reach a deal for both.

== Broadcasters ==
In the United States, the 2014 Winter Olympics were the first in a US$4.38 billion contract with NBC Sports, extending its broadcast rights to the Olympic Games through 2020 (with broadcast rights to Sochi valued at US$775 million alone). As it did during the 2012 Summer Olympics (which brought strong viewership, and ultimately turned a profit of $88 million, unlike the previous Winter Olympics, which resulted in a loss of US$223 million), NBC offered live and tape-delayed coverage of events on television across its free-to-air network and a number of pay TV channels, and provided streaming of all events online and on mobile platforms to those who subscribe to the channels. ESPN and Fox Sports made competing bids for 2014 and 2016 Games only, but were outbid by NBC.

In Europe, sports marketing agency Sportfive replaced the European Broadcasting Union as the sales agency of broadcast rights to the 2014 and 2016 Olympics in 40 European countries. The IOC still separately negotiated broadcast rights in larger European countries such as the United Kingdom, where after uncertainty over whether rights to the Games could be picked up by a pay television broadcaster such as Sky Sports (but shared with a free-to-air broadcaster to comply with the laws forbidding certain major sporting events from being exclusively broadcast on pay channels), the BBC announced prior to the 2012 Summer Olympics that it would maintain exclusive rights to the Games through 2020.

In Australia, after several major commercial networks (among the only entities which can hold the rights due to similar anti-siphoning laws) pulled out of bidding on rights to both the 2014 and 2016 Games due to cost concerns (which included Nine Network, who had lost AUD$22 million on its joint coverage of the 2012 Games with Foxtel, and Seven Network, whose bid was rejected for being lower than what Nine/Foxtel paid), the IOC awarded broadcast rights to the 2014 Winter Olympics to Network Ten for AUD$20 million; a fraction of the amount paid by Nine and Foxtel for their own coverage.

In Canada, where the 2010 and 2012 Games were broadcast by a consortium of Bell Media and Rogers Media properties, the Canadian Broadcasting Corporation announced in August 2012 that it had acquired the Canadian broadcast rights to the 2014 and 2016 Games, returning the Olympics to CBC Television and Ici Radio-Canada Télé for the first time since 2008. While financial details were not announced, the CBC did state that it was a "financially and fiscally responsible bid", which would carry on the organization's 60-year history of Olympic broadcasting. The CBC sub-licensed pay TV rights to TSN and Sportsnet (who served as the primary channels for pay TV coverage during the previous arrangement) in English, along with Réseau des sports and TVA Sports in French.

IMG acquired the rights for in-flight and in-ship markets.

Territory	Rights holder	Ref
Albania	TVSH	
Argentina	TV Pública; TyC Sports	
Armenia	Armenia 1	
Asia	Dentsu (Note: Rights in Afghanistan, Brunei, Cambodia, Chinese Taipei, East Timor, Indonesia, Iran, Laos, Malaysia, Mongolia, Myanmar, Papua New Guinea, Singapore, Thailand and Vietnam; to be resold to local broadcasters.)	
Austria	ORF; ATV (Note: ATV will only broadcast the opening and closing ceremonies.)	
Australia	Network Ten	
Azerbaijan	İTV	
Belarus	Belteleradio	
Belgium	RTBF; VRT	
Bosnia and Herzegovina	BHRT; RTRS	
Brazil	Rede Globo (SporTV); Rede Bandeirantes (BandSports); Rede Record	
Bulgaria	BNT; TV+	
Canada	CBC; Sportsnet; TSN; RDS; TVA Sports	
Caribbean	SportsMax	
Central Asia	Dentsu (Note: Rights in each country to be resold to local broadcasters.)	
Chile	UCV Television	
China	CCTV	
Colombia	Citytv Bogotá (Note: Only highlights programme and a few events on tape-delay.)	
Croatia	HRT	
Cyprus	CyBC	
Czech Republic	Czech Television; TV Nova; Czech Radio	
Denmark	DR; TV2	
East Timor	TVTL	
Estonia	ERR; MTG	
Europe	Sportfive	
Finland	Yle	
France	France Télévisions; RMC	
Georgia	GPB	
Germany	ARD; ZDF; Sport1 (Note: Sport1 will broadcast the hockey tournaments through a sub-licensing deal with both ARD and ZDF.)	
Greece	NEPIT	
Hong Kong	TVB	
Hungary	MTVA	
Iceland	RÚV; 365	
Ireland	RTÉ	
Israel	Sport 5	
Italy	Sky Italia; Cielo; RAI (Note: Only highlights programme.)	
Japan	Japan Consortium	
Kazakhstan	Khabar	
Kyrgyzstan	KTRK	
Latin America (Note: Rights in Argentina, Bolivia, Chile, Colombia, Costa Rica, Dominican Republic, Ecuador, El Salvador, Guatemala, Honduras, Nicaragua, Panama, Paraguay, Peru, Uruguay and Venezuela, except Brazil.)	América Móvil; DirecTV; ESPN; Fox Sports	
Latvia	LTV; MTG	
Lithuania	LNK; Lietuvos rytas TV; MTG	
Luxembourg	CLT-UFA	
Macedonia	MPT	
Mauritania	TVM	
Mexico	América Móvil; Canal 8; Canal 22	
Middle East	ASBU; OSN	
Moldova	TRM	
Mongolia	TV5	
Montenegro	RTCG	
Netherlands	NOS	
New Zealand	Sky Television	
North Africa	OSN	
North Korea	SBS	
Norway	TV2	
Pacific Islands (Note: Rights in Cook Islands, Fiji, Kiribati, Marshall Islands, Federated States of Micronesia, Nauru, Niue, Palau, Samoa, Solomon Islands, Tonga, Tuvalu and Vanuatu.)	Sky Television	
Philippines	Sports5	
Poland	TVP; NC+	
Portugal	Sport TV	
Romania	TVR	
Russia	C1R; VGTRK; NTV Plus	
Serbia	RTS	
Slovakia	RTVS; Markíza; TV Nova	
Slovenia	RTVslo	
South Africa	SABC; SuperSport	
South Asia	STAR Sports 4 (Note: Rights in Bangladesh, Bhutan, India, Maldives, Nepal, Pakistan, and Sri Lanka.)	
South Korea	KBS; MBC; SBS	
South Sudan	SSTV	
Spain	RTVE	
Sub-Saharan Africa	SuperSport; Infront Sports & Media	
Suriname	STVS	
Sweden	MTG	
Switzerland	SRG SSR	
Taiwan	ELTA	
Tunisia	ERTT	
Turkey	TRT	
Ukraine	NTKU; XSPORT	
United Kingdom	BBC	
United States	NBCUniversal	
Uzbekistan	MTRK	
Vietnam	VTV (Note: Opening and closing ceremonies only)	
