= Telecommunications in Mongolia =

Telecommunications in Mongolia face unique challenges. As the least densely populated country in the world, with a significant portion of the population living a nomadic lifestyle, it has been difficult for many traditional information and communication technology (ICT) companies to make headway into Mongolian society. With almost half the population clustered in the capital of Ulaanbaatar, most landline technologies are deployed there. Wireless technologies have had greater success in rural areas.

Mobile phones are common, with provincial capitals all having 4G access. Wireless local loop is another technology that has helped Mongolia increase accessibility to telecommunications and bypass fixed-line infrastructure. For Internet, Mongolia relies on fiber optic communications with its Chinese and Russian neighbors. In 2005, Mongolia's state-run radio and TV provider converted to a public service provider. Private radio and TV broadcasters, multi-channel satellite, and cable TV providers are also available.

== Telecommunications infrastructure ==
Telecommunications network is improving with international direct dialing available in many areas. A fiber-optic network has been installed that is improving broadband and communication services between major urban centers with multiple companies providing inter-city fiber-optic cable services.

- 7 satellite earth station: Intersputnik (Indian Ocean Region), Intelsat, Asiasat-1.
- International overland: Europe-Russia-Mongolia-China (ERMC) cable system.

== Telephones ==
- 385,000 fixed lines in use, 102nd in the world (2019 estimate).
- 4.3 million mobile-cellular lines in use, 127th in the world (2019 estimate).
- International dialing code: +976.

There are two landline telephone companies in Mongolia: Mongolia Telecom Company (MTC) and the Mongolian Railway Authority. MTC is a joint venture with Korea Telecom and partially publicly owned. MTC leases fiber-optic lines from the Mongolian Railway Authority and connects to all aimags and soums. The number of fixed-line phones in Mongolia is slowly decreasing. The majority of MTC subscribers are in Ulaanbaatar.

Mobile phones are very popular in the city as well as the countryside with 1.5 million active mobile social users in January 2017. Especially in the countryside, the government is preferring the installation of cell phone base stations over laying land lines, as cell phone base stations are easier to install. Mongolia's Communication Authority has announced a plan to connect all sum center and a number of other settlements to cell phone services. Since 2012 the country is covered by 3G services. The biggest problem of phone usage in rural parts of the country was the poor reception since in some areas getting the mobile signal required climbing on the highest mountain top in the neighbourhood or on the top of the horse on some hill. But with the plan of Communications Regulatory Commission of Mongolia that will allow the nationwide introduction of 4G mobile Internet technologies by approving licenses to use radio spectrum for 4G LTE service to Mobicom Corporation, Unitel, Skytel according to the first commission meeting in 2016 this problem should be resolved. It will also help parents for whom mobile phones are the only way to stay in touch with their children attending boarding schools in the cities.

Mobile operators

- Unitel (GSM)- The No.1 ICT group in Mongolia who have the first and nationwide 3G/4G/5G network.
- G-Mobile (CDMA) – Established in 2007, it is focusing on development in rural areas
- Mobicom Corporation (GSM) – The first mobile operator.
- Skytel (CDMA)
- ONDO LTE, 5G - Established in 2021, 5th competitor in telecommunications

service resembling that of landlines, but uses technology similar to mobile phones. There are currently five licensed WLL providers, though there only appear to be three companies actually offering service.

WLL providers

- Mongolia Telecom Company: WLL project a joint venture with LG Electronics Company of South Korea, 8,768 users, covers Darkhan, Erdenet, Nalaikh, Choibalsan, and Ulanbaatar. It also provides 450 MHz coverage in the following aimags: Orkhon, Darkhan Uul, Dornod, Arkhangai, Bayan-Ulgii, Bulgan, Hovd, Huvsgul, Zavkhan, and Uvs.
- Mobicom: Covers Ulaanbaatar and areas near the city, 13,400 users.
- Skytel: Covers Ulaanbaatar and rural Mongolia (area not specified), and has 22,000 users.

== Radio ==
As of 2008, more than 100 radio stations, including some 20 via repeaters for the public broadcaster as well as transmissions by multiple international broadcasters were available. As of 1997, there were 360,000 radios.

Ulaanbaatar has 20 FM stations, including foreign radio stations BBC World Service, VOA, and Inner Mongolian Radio. In the whole country there are 5 longwave broadcasting stations, the most powerful at Ulaanbaatar with 1000 KW.

== Television ==
Mongolian TV Broadcasting started on 27 September 1967 with the start of Mongolian National Television.

- Television sets: 118,000 (1997)

=== Television providers ===
Stations/Channels

- Mongolian National Broadcaster, the official, state-funded television channel in Mongolia.
- Premier Sports Network (PSN, dominant subscription television sports brand in Mongolia.)
- C1
- Channel 25
- Eagle TV
- Edutainment TV (Боловсрол суваг)
- ETV
- Mongol TV, first HD TV, New Mongol TV
- NTV
- SBN
- TV5
- TV8
- TV9
- Ulaanbaatar Broadcasting System (UBS)

Satellite television

- DDishTV LLC, broadcasts major Mongolian channels and some international channels throughout the whole of Mongolia and to other Asian countries via Ku-Band Satellite. For that service it is necessary to have a dish and special box.
- Mongolsat

Cable television

- DDishTV LLC
- MNBC CaTV
- Sansar CaTV – Space

Internet Protocol television (IPTV)

- Univision IPTV
- LookTV IPTV
- Homemedia IPTV
- Skymedia IPTV
- VOO IPTV

== Internet ==
The Internet, established in 1995 in Mongolia, has begun making a significant impact, with 83.0% of the population having access to it as of 2025. Mongolia is the most sparsely populated independent country in the world, which is a serious constraint to country-wide Internet deployment. While much of the country remains pastoral with countryside residents dependent on herding and agriculture, Internet access is widely available to urban populations. There has been steady online growth in online newspapers, magazines and advertising. The poor access to the Internet in the countryside has been a reason behind designating Mongolian countryside as a digital detox location for the tech-tired tourists.

- Internet users: 2,900,000 users; 83.0% of the population (2025).
- Fixed broadband: 115,561 subscriptions, 98th in the world; 3.6% of the population, 114th in the world (2012).
- Mobile broadband: 848,391 subscriptions, 75th in the world; 26.7% of the population, 61st in the world (2012).
- Internet hosts: 20,084 hosts, 118th in the world (2012).
- The top level domain of Mongolia is ".mn".

=== Internet service providers (ISPs) ===
Wholesale providers

- Information Communications Network LLC /NETCOM/
- Gemnet LLC
- Mobicom Networks LLC
- MT Networks

Retail providers

- Mongolia Telecom Company
- Univision[MCSCom]
- Openwavex (former Wicom Networks)
- Digicom (FTTB)
- Mobinet
- Magicnet
- Micom
- Bodicom
- Skymedia[SkyC&C]
- Yokozunanet
- Citinet
- HOMENET
- G-mobilenet

Satellite providers

- DDishTV LLC, provides VSAT Internet connections, especially in rural area of Mongolia.
- Isatcom LLC, national satellite provider in Mongolia, provides VSAT Internet connections, VPN network for organizations in rural areas of Mongolia, since its establishment in 2004. Also involved in the sale of solar energy equipment.

=== Internet initiatives ===
Citizens Information Service Centers (CISC) have been established in Ulaanbataar and six Aimags that are equipped to allow nomadic rural populations to receive internet access.

Many libraries and schools provide internet access, including some mobile providers that travel between rural populations.

The Asian Development Bank has an initiative to develop ICT technologies to "boost access to high-quality education for disadvantaged and remote populations in Mongolia, through a grant assistance approved for US$1 million." The goal is to take advantage of newer technologies to improve access to information for about 10,000 students at 36 schools.

=== Internet censorship and surveillance ===
There are no government restrictions on access to the Internet. The criminal code and constitution prohibit arbitrary interference with privacy, family, home, or correspondence, however, there are reports of government surveillance, wiretapping, and e-mail account monitoring. Individuals and groups engage in the peaceful expression of views via the Internet, including by e-mail. Defamation laws carrying civil and criminal penalties severely impede criticism of government officials. Moreover, in 2014 the Mongolian Telecommunications Regulatory Commission has published a list of up to 774 words and phrases, use of which is prohibited on local websites.

Censorship of public information is banned under the 1998 Media Freedom Law, but a 1995 state secrets law severely limits access to government information. After an eight-year campaign by activists, the parliament passed the Law on Information Transparency and Right to Information in June 2011, with the legislation taking effect in December 2011. Internet users remain concerned about a February 2011 regulation, the "General Conditions and Requirements on Digital Content", by the Communications Regulatory Commission (CRC) that restricts obscene and inappropriate content without explicitly defining it and requires popular websites to make their users' IP addresses publicly visible. The production, sale, or display of all pornography is illegal and carries a penalty of up to three months in prison.

While there is no official censorship by the government, journalists frequently complain of harassment and intimidation.

== Post ==
Mongol Post is the state-owned postal service of Mongolia.

== See also ==
- Telephone numbers in Mongolia
