= MNB (TV channel) =

Television channel of Mongolia

- Country: Mongolia
- Broadcast area: Mongolia; Asia (via satellites)
- Headquarters: Ulaanbaatar, Mongolia

Programming
- Picture format: SECAM (576i); HDTV (1080i)

Ownership
- Owner: Mongolian National Broadcaster
- Sister channels: MNB Mongolian News; MNB Sport HD; MNB World

History
- Launched: March 14, 1951 (original); March 14, 1951 (experimental); March 14, 1952 (trial); March 14, 1953 (regular); September 27, 1967 (relaunch)
- Closed: April 1, 1964 (original)
- Former names: Mongolian National Television (MNTV)

Links
- Website: http://www.mnb.mn

MNB, an onscreen brand of what is officially known as Монголын Үндэсний Олон Нийтийн Телевиз 1 (Mongolian for 'Mongolian National Public Television 1', shortened as МҮОНТ-1, Mongolian script: ᠮᠣᠩᠭᠣᠯ ᠬᠡᠯᠡᠨ ᠦ ᠦᠨᠳᠦᠰᠦᠲᠡᠨ ᠦ ᠨᠡᠶᠢᠲᠡ ᠶᠢᠨ ᠲᠧᠯᠧᠢᠰ ᠬᠣᠷᠢᠶ᠎ᠠ 1), is a television channel owned by the Mongolian National Broadcaster (MNB), the official, state-funded broadcaster in Mongolia. On average, the channel broadcasts for 17 hours a day, from 07:00 to midnight. MNB can be viewed worldwide on MNB's website.

== History ==
The television station was built in 1948 with joint Soviet and Mongolian funding. On March 14, 1953, the Mongolian National Television started broadcasts, and with it started Mongolian TV Broadcasting. MNTV Ceased broadcasting in 1964. MNTV was reestablished in 1967. Coverage was limited to Ulan Bator with a relay in Darkhan being added shortly after. Satellite delivery began in 1970 when it joined the Orbita satellite, enabling a national expansion. At the time, Mongolian TV only broadcast three hours a day. Initially all programmes were broadcast live but in December 1971 the Mongolian TV studios opened and another important step towards improving the quality of the images and enabling the pre-recording of documentaries and short films was taken. This in turn enabled the broadcast schedule to become much more varied and entertaining. Since the 1980s Mongolian National Broadcaster began working with a new generation of equipment made in Japan, France and Soviet Union and this, along with a new TV centre being put into commission, made the transition to colour possible. The conversion was complete in December 1988.

During communist rule, Mongol Television was a propaganda tool, showing a supposedly flawless Mongolia. It was the monopoly until the early-1990s, when it lost its monopoly to the private sector. Until 1992, it did not broadcast on all days of the week, viewers with Orbita's Intersputnik channel (which delivered programs from other Socialist countries and Cuba) had access to a seven-day service. Mongolian National Television, by contrast, broadcast four nights a week until 1986. The Soviet government built a new television center in 1988, enabling the improvement in broadcast hours and in infrastructure.

Until the mid-1980s, programs were only watched by a small percentage of the population but with the help of radio relay lines reception was extended. This development, coupled by the new television center and the rise of perestroika and glasnost in the USSR, led to new program genres appearing, including increased amounts of programs for children and youth. In 1991 it began broadcasting via the Asiasat satellite and this allowed its programs to be received in even the remotest parts of Mongolia. Today some 70% of the country's population watch the national TV channel.

In October 2000, MNTV moved the airtime of its evening news program Tsagiin Hürd (The Wheel of Time) from 9pm to 8pm, coinciding with Eagle TV's newscast. This came as part of a broader revamp of the channel, which also included a morning news service. Mongolian National Television was reorganized into the current MNB on January 27, 2005; the channel's name changed accordingly.

By the 2000s, after the arrival of democracy, MNB was still conservative. Forum, the country's biggest political talk show as of 2006, was financed by the Open Society Foundations, which helped democratize media in Mongolia.

== See also ==
- Media of Mongolia
- Communications in Mongolia
