= MN 25 (Mongolia) =

Television channel of Mongolia

- Country: Mongolia
- Broadcast area: Ulaanbaatar
- Headquarters: Ulaanbaatar, Mongolia

History
- Launched: 1996

MN 25 is a news television broadcaster in Mongolia. It is currently owned by B. Nandintushig.

It was founded in September 1996 by АE and JAAG LLC.

== See also ==
- Media of Mongolia
- Communications in Mongolia
