= Mt. Bogd Golf Course =

Golf course in Bayanzürkh, Ulaanbaatar, Mongolia

Coordinates: 47.882°N 107.044°E

Mt. Bogd Golf Club
- Interactive map of Mt. Bogd Golf Club

Club information
- Location: Bogd Khan Mountain, Ulaanbaatar Mongolia
- Established: 2012
- Type: Private
- Owner: Sky Resort LLC
- Tota holes: 18
- Website: www.skyresort.mn

Mt. Bogd Golf Club is the first international-standard 18-hole golf course in Mongolia, located in the Bogd Khan Mountain, Bayanzürkh District, Ulaanbaatar, Mongolia. It is situated 13 km (8 mi) to the southeast of downtown Ulaanbaatar. There are two other golf courses in Mongolia, yet none of them meets international standards with one having been built illegally by Korean investors.

== Development ==
The project started in 2008 with investments from four large Mongolian companies, including MCS Holding and Skytel (Mongolia). The architectural design was developed by GolfPlan USA. There are 5 sets of tees measuring 6,443 m (7,046 yd) from the back. In 2012, Mt.Bogd GC launched its testing operation. The course officially opened on June 22, 2013 and the Tourism Association of Mongolia hopes it will develop new types of tourism, namely golf tourism, in Mongolia.
