= Netcom =

Netcom may refer to:

- Army Network Enterprise Technology Command (NETCOM), a Signal command in the U.S. Army Cyber Command
- China Netcom, telecom company in mainland China
- NetCom (Norway), Telia Norge, Norwegian mobile phone operator
- Netcom (United States), an American Internet service provider
- Netcom (Mongolia), a backbone network owner and wholesale internet provider in Mongolia
- Netcom Research, later name for Jonos International, an American computer manufacturer
