= List of 2012 Summer Paralympics broadcasters =

The following is a list of broadcasters of the 2012 Summer Paralympics. Production of the world feeds were assumed by Olympic Broadcasting Services, while LOCOG awarded broadcast rights to the Games in over 100 countries.

== Broadcasters ==
- United Kingdom: Channel 4, with 150 hours of live coverage on Channel 4 and More4, along with additional coverage being carried by Freesat, Sky and Virgin Media (in both standard and high definition) as well as on Channel 4's website. Radio coverage was provided by the BBC on its radio channels BBC Radio 5 Live and BBC Radio 5 Live Sports Extra.
- Australia: The Australian Broadcasting Corporation broadcast the 2012 Paralympics across Australia, mostly on its digital channel ABC2. It broadcast over 100 hours of live coverage including both ceremonies.
- Brazil: Rede Globo and Sportv owned the broadcast rights to the Games in Brazil. While Sportv carried the bulk of coverage, Globo broadcast some events live.
- Canada: TSN (English) and RDS (French) produced daily hour-long highlight programs (some of which were aired by CTV Television and Citytv), while tape-delayed airings of the opening ceremony were carried by Sportsnet One, TSN2, RDS, and RDS2. Coverage with described video for the visually impaired was simulcasted by AMI-tv.
- China: China Central Television
- Colombia: Señal Colombia
- Denmark: State broadcaster DR held rights to the Paralympics in Denmark, broadcasting most of its coverage on DR HD.
- Europe: The European Broadcasting Union served as the sublicensor of broadcast rights in most of Europe.
- Finland: Yle, the state broadcaster.
- France: France Ô broadcast the opening and closing ceremonies; TV8 Mont-Blanc broadcast the Games with 77 hours of television coverage.
- Germany: ARD and ZDF broadcast the Games, with approximately 65 hours of television coverage.
- Greece: NET (now known as ERT2) 2 broadcast the games with approximately 79 hours of television coverage.
- Ireland: Setanta Ireland, Irish digital subscription channel, providing it on a Free-to-view basis. Highlights on RTÉ Two, state broadcaster.
- Italy: Sky Italia, the Italian digital subscription channel, and RAI for free broadcasting.
- Japan: NHK, public broadcaster
- New Zealand: Sky Sport broadcast the opening and closing ceremonies, as well as day and evening highlights. Sky Sport's highlights channel showed highlights every three hours. iSky also broadcast show highlights. Prime broadcast two one-hour special documentaries called "Black and White – the Paralympic Story", and Prime News had the coverage during their 5:30 news programme and "The Crowd Goes Wild" programme.
- Norway: NRK broadcast the games on NRK1, NRK2 and four web channels.
- Russia: VGTRK.
- Singapore: MediaCorp broadcast the Games with a daily highlights show and live coverage of the opening and closing ceremonies.
- South Africa: SuperSport, broadcasting on the DStv satellite service provided eight or more hours of live and delayed programming per day on their Supersport 6 channel. DStv is a subscription service available in most of Africa south of the Sahara. The SABC broadcast a two-hour daily highlights programme from 22:00 SAST on the SABC2 free-to-air television channel.
- South Korea: Korean Broadcasting System (KBS).
- Spain: RTVE broadcast the Games, with approximately 150 hours of live coverage on Teledeporte and TVE HD.
- Sweden: Sveriges Television (SVT) broadcast approximately 40 hours live on SVT1, SVT2, SVT24 and their web service SVT Play.
- Thailand: A consortium of Thai broadcasters known as the TV Pool, consisting of Channel 3, Royal Army's Channel 5, BBTV Channel 7, and Modernine TV, broadcast the Paralympics in Thailand.
- Turkey: TRT
- United States: NBC Sports broadcast 4 one-hour highlight shows on NBC Sports Network, and NBC broadcast a final 90-minute special on 16 September.
- Malaysia: Radio Television Malaysia

== See also ==
- List of 2012 Summer Olympics broadcasters
