= WakuWaku Japan =

Japanese pay TV channel

- Country: Japan
- Broadcast area: Indonesia, Myanmar, Singapore, Taiwan, Sri Lanka, Mongolia, Vietnam, Malaysia & Philippines
- Headquarters: Minato, Tokyo, Japan; Koto, Tokyo, Japan

Programming
- Languages: English, Japanese, Indonesian, Mandarin
- Picture format: 1080i HDTV (downscaled to 16:9 480i for the SDTV feed)

Ownership
- Owner: WakuWaku Japan Corporation (SKY Perfect JSAT Group)

History
- Launched: 22 February 2014 (12 years ago)
- Closed: 2 August 2021 (Indonesia; MNC Vision only); 31 March 2022 (rest of all countries)

Links
- Website: www.wakuwakujapan.com/en/

WakuWaku Japan (stylized as WAKUWAKU JAPAN) was a Japanese-based pay television channel that broadcast Japanese programs to overseas viewers in Asia. The channel broadcast programming in Japanese, as well as translated versions in Indonesian, Mandarin, and English. Subtitles and dubbing were available in some countries.

WakuWaku Japan provided programs in various genres of anime, superhero dramas, live-action dramas, culture programs and entertainment programs.

== History ==
Before WakuWaku Japan was launched, SKY Perfect JSAT Corporation started the channel project in 2011. WakuWaku means "pleasing" or "thrilling" in Japanese. In order to keep everything on track, the Japanese government allocated funds amounting to ¥15.5 billion (or approximately US$126.17 million) to finance the channel. These funds were to be used for the cost of dubbing and making subtitles, as well as the costs of promotion, administration and production. On 22 February 2014, at 17:00 JKT (19:00 JST), WakuWaku Japan officially launched in Indonesia with its first program, WakuWaku Japan Music Festival.

On its first broadcasting day, WakuWaku Japan used the 12-hour system. However, when launched in Myanmar, it changed to the 24-hour system. On 29 February 2016, it reverted to the 12-hour system. In Indonesia, the channel was reverted to a 24-hour system on 27 February 2017, however, it reverted to 12-hour system in January 2018.

Initially, the channel was only available on Indovision and OkeVision (both of these are now known as MNC Vision). On 1 June 2014, WakuWaku Japan became available on Transvision, OrangeTV, Big TV and First Media. On the same day at 06:00 MMT (07:30 JST), WakuWaku Japan officially launched in Myanmar, although it was only available on 4TV, a Burmese terrestrial pay television service.

On 4 March 2015, SKY Perfect JSAT Corporation planned to expand Japanese content to overseas by establishing WakuWaku Japan Corporation. On 1 July 2015, WakuWaku Japan Corporation was officially established, taking over its ownership from SKY Perfect JSAT Corporation.

On 6 July 2015, at 17:00 SGT (18:00 JST), WakuWaku Japan officially launched in Singapore and it is currently available on Singtel TV and StarHub TV. On 26 January 2016, WakuWaku Japan announced that it will begin broadcasting in Thailand on 26 March, through Ch3SD, a Thai terrestrial pay television service. On 26 March, WakuWaku Japan began a temporary broadcast in Thailand until 27 March under the name 'WakuWaku Japan Hour', which broadcast from 09:00 until 10:30.

On 28 July 2016, WakuWaku Japan announced that it would begin broadcasting in Taiwan in September. It was officially launched in Taiwan on 1 September 2016, at 19:00 NST (20:00 JST), with its first program, Shiki-Oriori: Japan Food & Festival. WakuWaku Japan becomes the first Japanese entertainment TV channel to launch in Sri Lanka along with its debut on Dialog TV on 7 October 2016.

On 8 November 2016, WakuWaku Japan announced that it would begin broadcasting in Vietnam through VTVcab, a Vietnamese cable pay television service. On 1 December, WakuWaku Japan will begin temporarily airing in Vietnam under the name 'WakuWaku Japan Hour', from 18:00 until 21:00 on three different channels are: VTVcab22 LIFE TV, VTVcab8 BiBi, and VTVcab Technical. But on 1 April 2018, WakuWaku Japan officially launched in Vietnam, but available on VTVcab and Next TV.

It was announced on 6 January 2017, WakuWaku Japan would begin broadcasting in Mongolia through Univision and DDish TV. On 25 March, WakuWaku Japan officially launched their mascots, Waa and Kuu, to coincide with the premiere of original-produced kids program, WakuWaku be Ponckickies. In July 2017 in Taiwan, WakuWaku Japan became officially available on Taiwan Broadcasting Communications.

On 5 April 2021, WakuWaku Japan began broadcasting in the Philippines through Cignal, a Philippine satellite television and IPTV provider.

On 2 August 2021, WakuWaku Japan terminated its broadcast on MNC Vision (since its original launch) and a IPTV service MNC Play. Meanwhile, the network continued to air via First Media, Transvision and UseeTV.

On 25 February 2022, it was announced that WakuWaku Japan would cease operations effective 31 March 2022 due to bankruptcy and losses. The channel ceased operations on that same day with the 2020 edition of Summer Vacation with Ariyoshi being its final program aired. Some of its programming can be viewed via OTT platforms like Netflix, Amazon Prime Video, Apple TV+, Catchplay+, Viu, WeTV iflix, iQIYI, Viki, Bilibili and Disney+ across Asia. The feed in some countries ceased operations a few minutes or hours before the closure.

== Programming ==
WakuWaku Japan provides programs associating with music, sports and children's content. Imported programs from a variety of genres are rebroadcast, including anime, superhero programs like Kamen Rider, live-action drama series, culture programs, entertainment shows like Iron Chef, sports and documentary series. WakuWaku Japan also re-broadcasts music programs and has a portion of re-broadcast programming set aside for children under the block name WakuWaku Kids, as well as an entertainment block called NHK Family Time.. In the Drama section, currently there are four time slots: Drama Woman, which broadcasts NHK's Asadora; Drama Legend, which broadcasts Japanese dramas from the 1990s to the 2000s; Drama Hits, which broadcasts Japanese dramas; and Drama NEO, which broadcasts the latest Japanese drama every Friday night.

=== Original programming ===
- Music Japan TV (2014–2017)
- WakuWaku Kids (2015–2016)
- J.League Goal Highlights (2015–2016)
- WakuWaku Football Academy (2015–2016)
- Shiki-Oriori: Japan Food & Festival (2015–2017)
- Quiz Surprise!! Japan (Indonesia and Myanmar only) (2015–2016)
- Catch Your Dream! –Study in Japan- (2017)
- Let's Enjoy Japanese! aJapan
- The Asian Judge (2016)
- Tokyo Doki Doki Campus LIFE (2016)
- The Wonder Japan -Takumi- (2015)
- Shiki-Oriori (2014–2015)
- Dream of Red & White Samurai (Indonesia only) (2015)
- Enjoy! Tokyo Disney Resort TV
- Washoku World Challenge 2015
