= Telecom Mongolia =

Telecommunication company of Mongolia

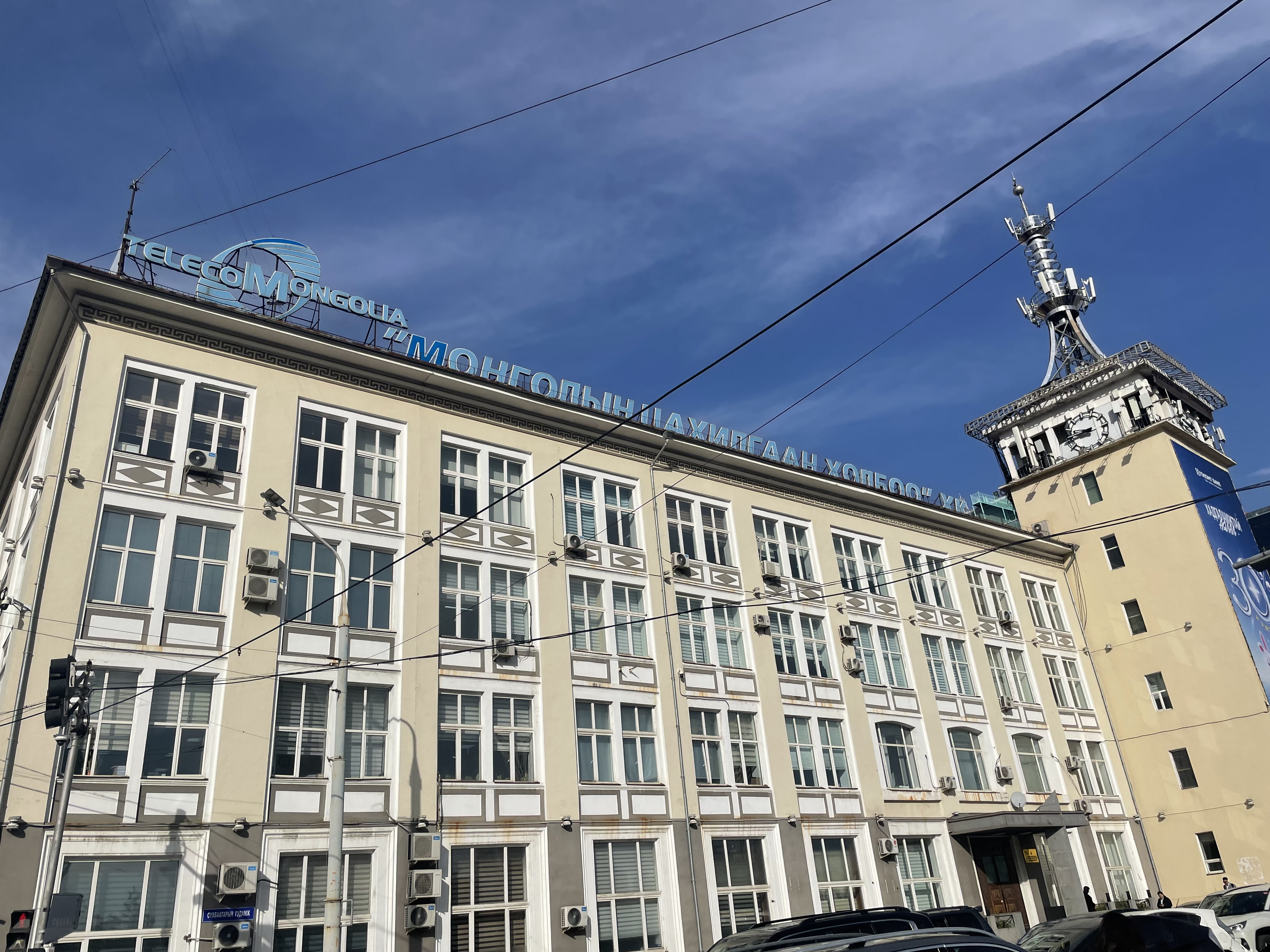
- Native name: Монголын Цахилгаан Холбоо ХК
- Founded: 1992
- Headquarters: Ulaanbaatar, Mongolia
- Website: Official website

The Telecom Mongolia (MTC; Mongolian: Монголын Цахилгаан Холбоо ХК) was created in 1992 after the Ministry of Communications in the Communist era was restructured and phone services were privatized. The majority of shares in the company are still held by the state, 40% are owned by KT (formerly Korea Telecom), and 5.56% are publicly traded. MTC is the predecessor to Information Communications Network LLC, commonly known as NetCo.
