= Eagle News (Mongolia) =

Television channel of Mongolia

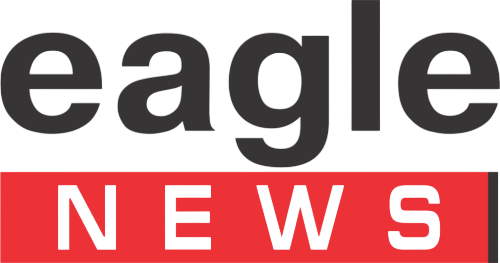
- Country: Mongolia
- Broadcast area: Ulaanbaatar
- Headquarters: Ulaanbaatar, Mongolia

Ownership
- Owner: Mongolian Media Corp, LLC

History
- Launched: 1994
- Former names: Eagle TV (Ийгл Телевиз)

Links
- Website: eagle.mn

Eagle News (Mongolian: Ийглийн мэдээ Iigliin medee), formerly known as Eagle TV (Mongolian: Ийгл Телевиз Iigl Televiz) is a television broadcaster in Mongolia. The station focuses on independent news, uncensored live audience feedback, and, formerly, Protestant Christian programming.

== History ==
From 1994 to 2002 Eagle Television was operated on terrestrial Channel 8 by Mongolian Broadcasting Company (MBC). MBC was a joint venture of the American nonprofit, AMONG Foundation - a ministry of Campus Crusade for Christ- and Mongolia Media Corporation (MMC). Eagle TV was initially formed to help the democratic revolution in Mongolia and to reach Mongolia and the rest of Asia for Christ by utilizing space on Asia SAT. Because Asia SAT reached all of China, it was a high priority for AMONG Foundation. However, in spite of great effort, an agreement with Asia SAT never materialized. In 1995 AMONG Foundation advertised in national publications for engineers, producer and content creators that would be willing to commit to a 2-year term helping get Eagle TV up and running. Paul and Ann Swartzentruber arrived in Mongolia in circa 1995. Paul would be the chief engineer and helped get some programing on the air. Prior to that Tim and Candence Purnell arrived in the country to help with legal matters. Tim was an attorney. Ken and Grace Witkoe were the next family that arrive. Ken was the new station manager and production director. He arrived in March of 1996 (a couple of months ahead of his family as they arrived in May). A few months later Russ and Bev Warth also arrived. Russ became the station technical director and CEO. The first airing of Eagle TV News (a new nightly newscast that was free non-state control news) aired circa summer of 1996. The very first airing was a pre-recorded newscast that was edited "live" and produced on 3/4 inch cassette (BetaSP). The newscast was shot as close to airtime as possible. The first show was rushed from the newsroom and given to Ken in operations. Ken quickly loaded the tape, set first-video and set pre-roll and rolled the tape with not one second to spare and the first Eagle TV Newscast went "live"! Tim Purnell noted that it was one of the most exciting moments in Eagle TV's short history. Eagle TV News and Eagle TV in general became a smashing success in Mongolia. Eagle TV and Ken shot several news stories that not only aired in Mongolia but also was picked up by CNN international. After a very successful start-up and working to create more content, Mongolian voiced Christian cartoons and the highly successful Mongolia Voiced NBA replays, as well as shooting spots and advertisement for political campaigns (whose spots aired in the NBA replays - this one act alone was thought to have helped the struggling democratic party to shock the world and take the overwhelming majority of parliament seats against the communists in the 1996 election), Ken and Grace, Russ and Bev moved back to American in 1998.

It was also believed that the channel's creation was due to American interests, as the country has minerals, as well as countering China's influence. Incumbent Mongolian President Tsakhiagiin Elbegdorj-then well known Mongolian democracy leader and a Member of Parliament helped to create Mongolia's first independent TV station Eagle Television in 1994. In 2002, the American Tom Terry took over the management of MBC and Eagle TV.

Terry moved to transform the TV station's struggling news and Christian programming in keeping with his vision of political freedom and the advocacy of Christianity. This proved to be a magnet of controversy as the station was opened to uncensored live commentary from viewers and launched the nation's first live international news coverage. Uncensored public commentary was a radical change in Mongolia's media and political landscape. Newspaper articles and criticism from public officials on Mongolia's State run television were countered by Eagle TV openly advocating increased freedom of speech and press through television, and it launched a strategy to increase public input into Eagle TV's on-air operations.

In the early years, notable programming that aired on the channel included NBA playoffs with Mongolian commentary, The Flintstones (dubbed and renamed as The Flintstone People) and CNN relays. This was attached to religious programming, both local and American. In 1997, it was expected that the Christian programming would be dropped by 2000.

At the same time, unbeknown to Eagle TV's viewers, the shareholders were embroiled in long-standing and severe disagreements over issues of contribution and control of the newly dynamic TV station. One month after achieving its highest-ever ratings, the shareholders abruptly closed the station as a result of legal threats and corporate infighting. The government of Mongolia, controlled by the former communist party, reacted by revoking MBC's broadcast license, preventing the station from re-launching its operations.

After the station's closure, AMONG Foundation formed Eagle Broadcasting Company, appointing Tom Terry as managing director, and charging him with re-launching Eagle TV as a cable TV channel. About half a year later the new Eagle TV began broadcasting on SANSAR Cable as Mongolia's first all-news cable channel.

Eagle TV launched a 24/7 news format with uncensored public commentary during live newscasts as a cornerstone of the station. In addition, it launched the nation's first live coverage of in-country breaking news including the only all-day live coverage of Mongolia's 2005 presidential election.

In light of the increasing popularity of Eagle TV's cable operations, the former business partners AMONG and MMC negotiated their further cooperation over most of 2005. The talks resulted in an agreement in September 2005 for the Mongolian side to acquire the broadcast license for terrestrial Channel 8, and Eagle Broadcasting Company to have exclusive use of the channel for ten years, and exercising exclusive control over all television content during that period. Based upon the agreement the Mongolian government restored the license for Channel 8, paving the way for Eagle TV to return to its former channel.

On October 22, 2005, Eagle Television launched its Channel 8 broadcasts with live all-day coverage of U.S. Secretary of Defense Donald Rumsfeld’s visit to Mongolia.

On April 1, 2011 Eagle TV was sold to Mongolia Media Corporation, a subsidiary of Bodi International. Terry resigned his position as company president and was appointed as Executive Director of AMONG Mongolia, a television production company in Ulaanbaatar producing Christian television programming airing on Eagle TV.

On February 3rd, 2014 Terry released, "Like An Eagle," a biography of his nine years with Eagle Television. At this point, the station had become a full-on news channel (Eagle News) owned by Mongol Mass Media Group, also becoming a CNN partner. The channel had become entirely secular, having dropped their religious programming from the days as a station owned by the AMONG Foundation. The religious programming moved to sister channel Eagle Live, with AMONG only being involved in program production rather than channel ownership.

== See also ==
- Media of Mongolia
- Communications in Mongolia
