= ETV (Mongolia) =

Television channel of Mongolia

Emerge Television (ETV)
- Country: Mongolia
- Broadcast area: Nationwide
- Headquarters: Ulaanbaatar, Mongolia

History
- Launched: 2010

Emerge Television (ETV; Mongolian: ETV Телевиз) is a television broadcaster in Mongolia owned by Davaabayar Ch of IMerge Media LLC. It was founded in 2010.

It is also affiliated with Ikh Mongol FM 99.7 (Mongolian: Их Монгол ФМ 99.7).

== History ==
It was founded in July 2010. In July 2013 its coverage expanded to a national scale.

== See also ==
- Media of Mongolia
- Communications in Mongolia
