= TV8 (Mongolian TV channel) =

Television channel of Mongolia

TV8 Television
- Country: Mongolia
- Headquarters: Ulaanbaatar, Mongolia

History
- Launched: 2006

Links
- Website: http://www.tv8.mn/

TV8 Television (Mongolian: ТВ8 телевиз) is a television broadcasting station in Mongolia. It is owned by Bayarmunkh Sengee of Seruuleg Construction LLC.

== History ==
It was established in 2006. In its launch year it carried Tata-tunga, a weekly game show about Genghis Khan.

In 2014, the channel switched to HD technology.

== See also ==
- Media of Mongolia
- Communications in Mongolia
