= TV9 Mongolia =

Television channel of Mongolia

TV9 Mongolia (TV9)
- Country: Mongolia
- Broadcast area: Central asia
- Headquarters: Ulaanbaatar, Mongolia

Ownership
- Owner: Media Holding
- Sister channels: CINEMA HD

History
- Launched: December 1, 2003

Links
- Website: www.tv9.mn

TV9 Mongolia, or TV9, 2003 founded is a digital television broadcasting station in Mongolia.

It is the largest private TV station in Mongolia behind the state-owned Mongolian National Broadcaster. TV9 became the first channel in Mongolia to broadcast 24 hours a day. It has contracted correspondents in all 21 aimags. and it broadcasts on2 channels.

== Radio ==
TV-9 operates a radio station on FM 103.6. It broadcasts special musical programs, news programs, sport programs, shows and events, and training and scientific individual programs.

== Public relations ==
TV9 is a member of The Asia-Pacific Broadcasting Union (ABU), and also works with some international television stations such as Beijing TV, Hasag TV, Reuters, Russia 1, NTV, and Hulunbeir TV in Inner Mongolia.

TV9 has a relationship with USAID, with a goal to support countryside life and their small businesses.

== See also ==
- Media of Mongolia
- Communications in Mongolia
