= SBN (Mongolia) =

Television channel of Mongolia

Supervision Broadcasting Network (SBN)
- Country: Mongolia
- Headquarters: Ulaanbaatar, Mongolia

History
- Launched: 2006

Links
- Website: www.sbn.mn

Supervision Broadcasting Network (SBN; Mongolian: SBN Телевиз) is a television channel in Mongolia. It is a subsidiary of Supervision LLC which is owned by Boldkhet Sereeter.

It was established in 2006.

== See also ==
- Media of Mongolia
- Communications in Mongolia
