= C1 Television =

Television network in Mongolia

C1 Television (C1)
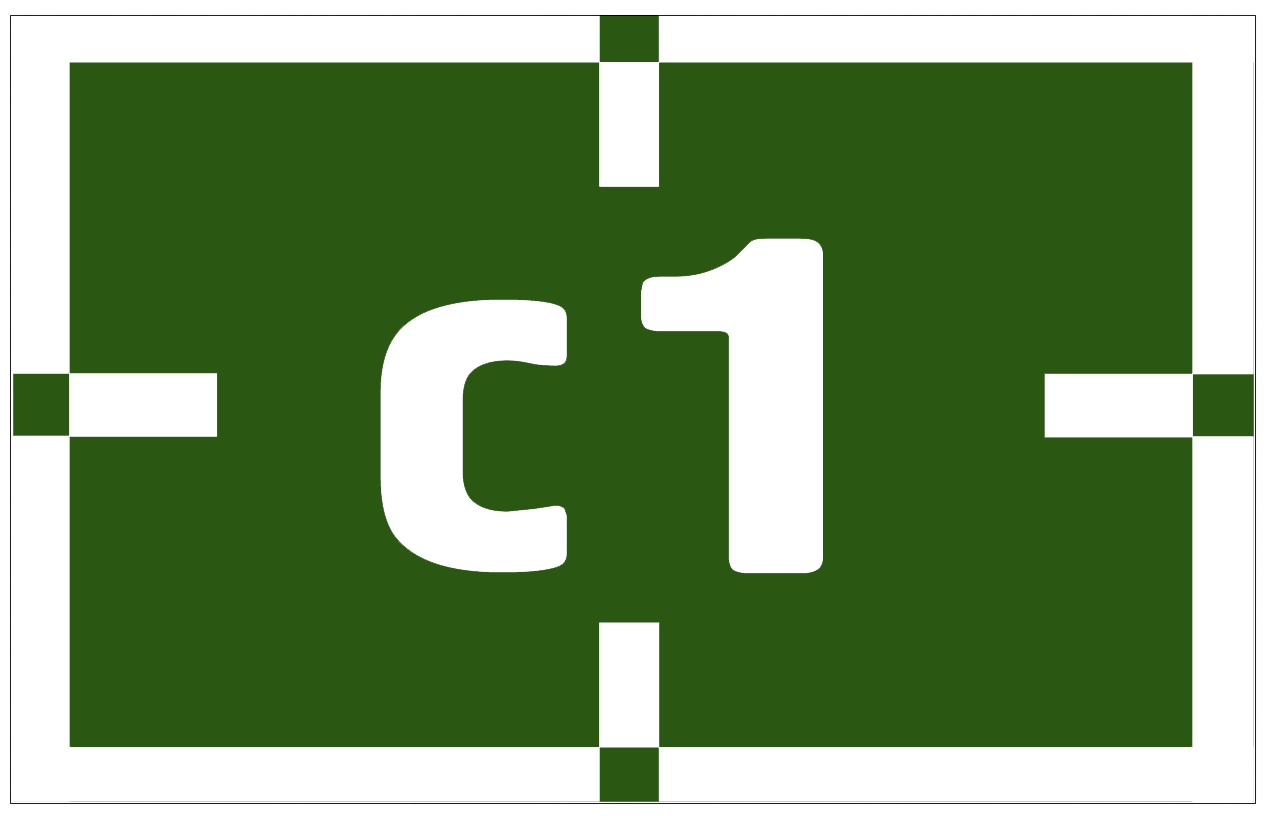
- Country: Mongolia
- Broadcast area: Worldwide
- Headquarters: Ulaanbaatar, Mongolia

Programming
- Language: Mongolian
- Picture format: HDTV 1080i

History
- Launched: 2006

Links
- Website: www.facebook.com/C1television

C1 Television (Mongolian: С1 Телевиз), or C1, is a television broadcaster in Mongolia.

== History ==
Channel 1 television was founded on 24 April 2006. According to the station, it is the first in Mongolia to use fully digital video processing.

== TV programming ==
C1 Television broadcasts a variety of programming. The following are noteworthy:

- News. C1 gets its foreign news clips from Reuters, and its domestic news from its own crew.
- Sport. C1 gets its sport news from the ESPN and Eurosport. C1 was the only official Mongolian broadcaster of 2010 FIFA World Cup in South Africa and aired all the matches live. The broadcasting was sponsored by several prominent local corporations that include Khan bank and Skytel among others.
- Entertainment. C1 broadcasts Mongolian Movies, Talk shows, and Movie News. Also C1 broadcasts Bizarre Foods with Andrew Zimmern, Ben 10, and Skins (TV series).

== See also ==
- Media of Mongolia
- Communications in Mongolia
