= Radio Télévision Guinéenne =

Public broadcaster in Guinea

- Type: Broadcast
- Country: Guinea
- Availability: National
- Owner: Government of Guinea
- Launch date: Television: 1977

Radio Télévision Guinéenne (RTG) is a public broadcaster of the West African state of Guinea. Radio Télévision Guinéenne is headquartered in the capital city of Conakry.

== Background and history ==
Radio broadcasting in Guinea started in the colonial era, when the country was called French Guinea. Up until its independence, on 2 October 1958, the main activity of "radio banana" consisted in the broadcast of warnings and messages of the large local commercial companies on the movements of boats transporting bananas or citrus fruits; after independence, "radio banana" became Radio Guinée.

In 1962 the Voix de la Révolution (French for Voice of the Revolution) was created, the organization responsible for managing radio, and the offer increased to two stations, one national and the other international, which however were merged in November 1970, returning to being one. In May 1977 the first television channel started, which at the beginning was in black and white; color was introduced in June 1977. Full-color broadcasting since 1979.

After the death of Ahmed Sekou Touré in 1984, the Voix de la Révolution became the current Radio Télévision Guinéenne, and a general director was placed at the head of the organization. In January of the same year, a documentation and archive service was created in charge of collecting, processing and making available all the documents produced and received by RTG, and safeguarding the audiovisual heritage of the radio and television archives; archive management was computerized in 1990.

In August 1992, regional radio station RKS was created to serve the Conakry area within an 80 km radius.

RTG television broadcasting began in 2002 via satellite. In April 2025, the free-to-air RTG and RTG 2 channels on the satellite were discontinued in order to be moved to the graveyard orbit on the Intelsat 901 satellite. Currently, only encrypted satellite platforms continue.

In 2007, a Guinean Air Force MiG-21 departing from Conakry crashed into the Radio Television Guineenne headquarters. The Russian pilot ejected and was unharmed.

RTG is member of the African Union of Broadcasting (AUB).
