= DDishTV =

Mongolian direct-to-home satellite television service

- Industry: Satellite television
- Founded: 2008
- Headquarters: Ulaanbaatar, Mongolia
- Area served: Mongolia
- Key people: Ariunbaatar Dorj (CEO)
- Website: www.ddishtv.mn

DDISHTV (Mongolian: ДДэшТВ ХХК) is a Mongolian Direct-to-home television service provider company led by Bold Ganbat (CEO).

A member of the Asia-Pacific Broadcasting Union, DDISHTV was established in 2008 to carry out Mongolian government's proposal to broadcast more television channels in the countryside in high quality. It has officially started broadcasting in June 2008.

== Background ==
Previously people outside of bigger cities in Mongolia were able to view only four national TV channels due to outdated C-Band system with analog technology which requires big antenna. DDISH began to work as first and unique operator with more TV channels to the consumers across the country through latest Ku-Band technology which allows small dishes.

== Coverage area ==
As of February 2017, DDISH broadcast across Mongolia for over 300,000 customers, though the reception is also available in foreign countries, such as Russia and China. The service operates on Koreasat 5A satellite, formerly was on Telstar 18 satellite.

== Broadcast TV and radio programmes ==
In June 2008, DDISH broadcast first 18 TV channels in whole Mongolia. As now, there are 130+ international and Mongolian channels.

Moreover, there are four FM channels, including Mongolian National Radio Program 1, Mongolian National Radio Program 2, "Lavain Egshig" and "Ulgii" Radio.

== Products ==
DDISH TV has 3 base packages based on customer demand.

1. Package S : Standard - 86+ channels.

2. Package M : Happy - 120+ channels.

3. Package L : Super - 124+ channels.

4. NVOD - Pay per view service from 4 channels MONGOLIAN, NEW, ADVENTURE, KIDS titles.

5. RVOD - Pay per view service. Subscribers now able to watch movies on demand using Arion and Intek STB and USB.

6. SVOD - Pay up to 12 months for Mongolian, Asian, Hollywood, Hits and Kids titles for subscription model.

7. Premium channels - Playboy, HBO movie package, SPS sport package and Series package.

== Sales channel ==
1. 5 main branches

2. 56 authorised dealers

3. Over 3800 Unitel main branches and contract dealers

== Satellite link ==
DDISH uses Apstar 5 a.k.a. Telstar 18 to broadcast its programmes. Telstar 18 was launched in June 2008 by Sea Launch, as a replacement satellite for APSTAR-I. It has an estimated operational lifetime of over 15 years. DDISH made a contract with KTSAT to use Koreasat-5A which was launched in October 2017 by SpaceX. The migration from Apstar-5 to Koreasat-5A is completed and the subscribers in Mongolia are enjoying high quality DTH service via Koreasat-5A.
