= Channel 25 (Mongolia) =

Television channel in Mongolia

25-р суваг телевиз Channel 25 Television
- Country: Mongolia
- Broadcast area: Mongolia
- Headquarters: Ulaanbaatar, Mongolia

History
- Launched: 1996

Links
- Website: www.tv25.mn

Channel 25 (Mongolian: 25-р суваг телевиз) is a commercial television channel in Mongolia. Channel 25 was established on 27 September 1996 by JAAG FM 107 radio. Channel 25 is the first non-government owned television channel in Mongolia.

Popular programs in 2006 were 60 Seconds, giving locals a chance to talk about any subject, and 360º, a news satire. The latter was subject to censorship due to possible problems with political themes.

Popular anime and cartoons aired by the channel include Doraemon, Inazuma Eleven known as Хүчирхэг Арван Нэг, Inazuma Eleven GO, Inazuma Eleven Ares no Tenbin, Dragon Ball Z, Shinkalion known as Шинкалион, Ninja Hattori known as Нинжа Хатори, Chibi Maruko-chan, Tamagotchi, Guardians of the Galaxy, Samurai Jack known as Самурай Жек , Tobot Galaxy Detectives known as Тобот Галатикийн Мөрдөгч , Infinity Nado known as Надо Тулаан and Gravity Falls known as Хүндийн Хүчний Уналт in Mongolian. All are aired in Mongolian dub and still airs to this days around local time depending on their schedule from 17:15 to 18:50.

== See also ==
- Media of Mongolia
- Communications in Mongolia
