= Skytel (Mongolia) =

Mongolian telecommunications company

SKYtel Group
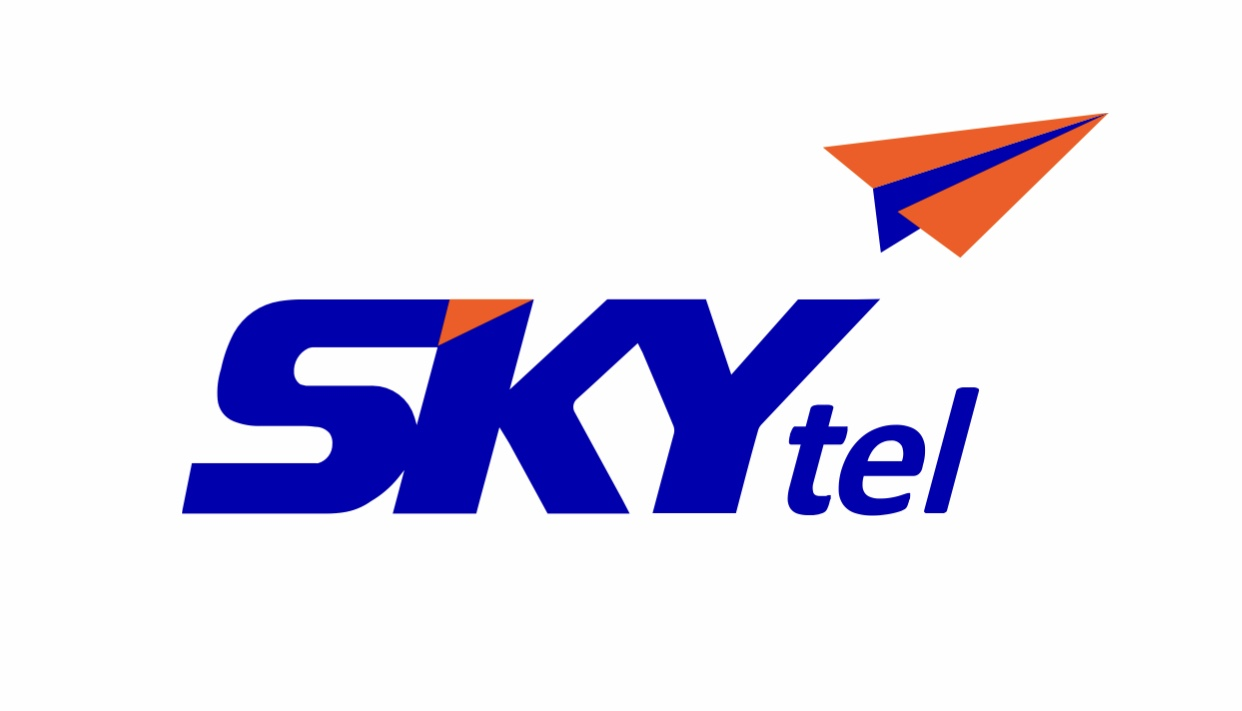

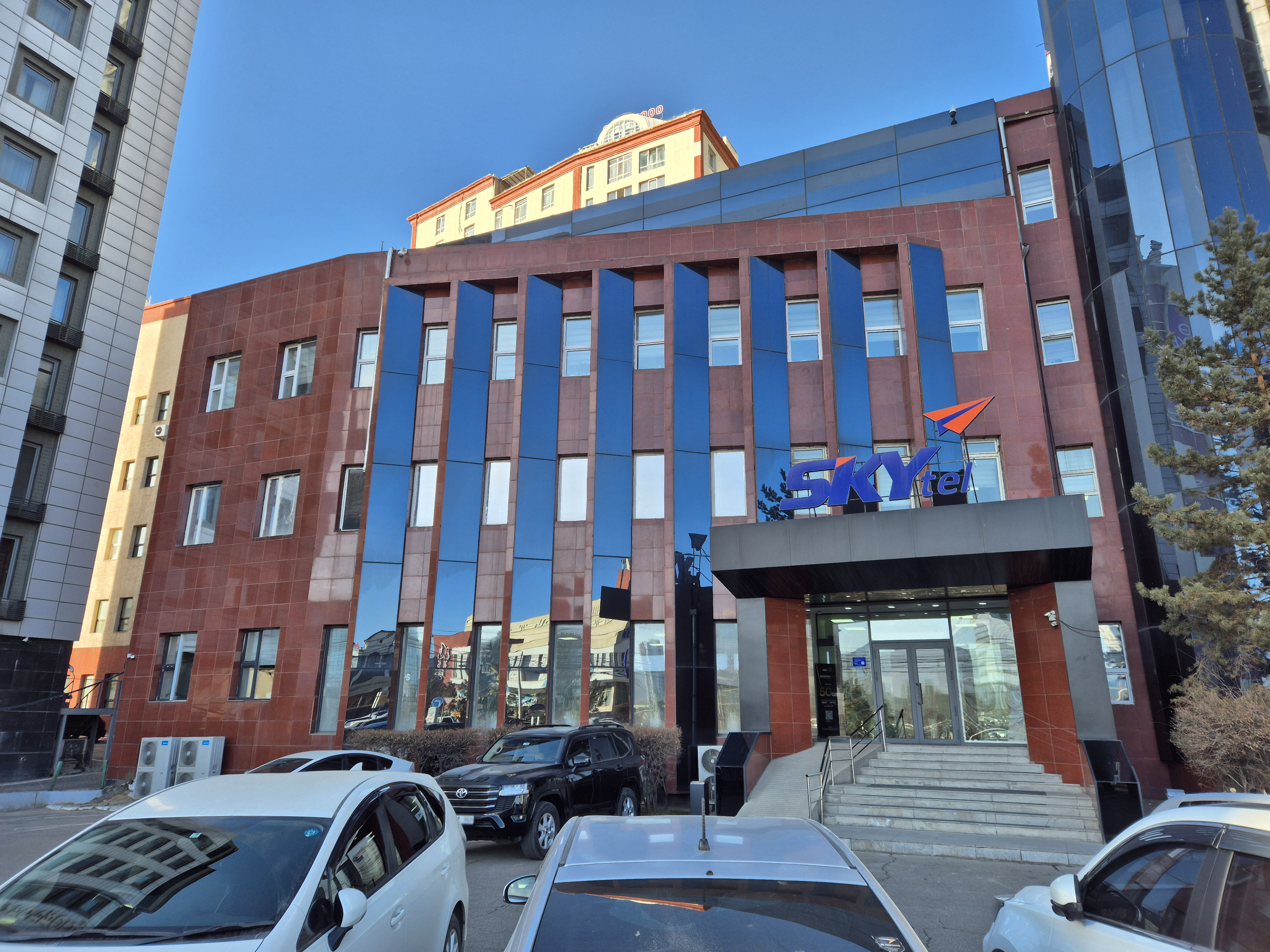
- Native name: СКАЙтел (Mongolian)
- Industry: Telecommunications
- Founded: March 25, 1999; 26 years ago
- Headquarters: Sukhbaatar District, District 1, Chingis Avenue 9, Skytel Plaza Ulaanbaatar, Mongolia
- Area served: Mongolia
- Key people: Gantömör Amarchingun; (CEO)
- Services: Wireless communications; Internet access; Long distance
- Website: https://www.skytel.mn

Skytel Group (Mongolian: СКАЙтел групп) is a comprehensive Mongolian information technology service provider group company. Skytel Group first started its operations in 1999 as the 2nd operator of the market, and is one of the TOP 100 enterprises selected based on the number of employees, sales revenue, and the amount of taxes paid to the state.

Today, Skytel Group provides all types of mobile communication services, mobile broadband Internet, IPTV services, and OTT video streaming services. It also owns 50 percent of Skynetworks, a national fiber optic internet operator. As of 2022, it is one of the 2 main players in the Internet IPTV service market and occupies 1/3 of the market for 20% of the total market for mobile communications in Mongolia.

Skytel, a joint venture between Mongolia and Korea, began its operations on March 25, 1999. In 2010, the company's shares owned by the Korean side were purchased by large Mongolian group companies such as Altai Holding and Shunkhlai Holding, making it a national company with 100% Mongolian investment. expanded to

Skytel Group provides services to more than 800,000 mobile users, over 100,000 users of IPTV, Internet and landline phones throughout Mongolia through 65 branches and more than 7,000 contracted distributors, and Skytel's roaming service network covers more than 240 countries around the world.

== History ==
Skytel Group was founded in March 25, 1999 with Mongolian and Korean (SK Telecom and Taihan) joint investment. Since February 12, 2001 the company started operating on CDMA IS-95B system eventually emerging to more advanced CDMA 2000-1x technology. In 2010 the company has successfully introduced 3.75G HSPA+ network providing up to 21 Mbit/s speed in wireless broadband. Skytel is expected to launch its IPTV services in summer of 2012. In December 2011 Mongolian business groups have acquired the Korean shares of the company making it a 100% national enterprise. In middle of 2012, Skytel Group has expanded its CDMA 3G network to all province center. CDMA 2000 Evdo Rev.A network has been covered all province centers. Since 2012, the corenetwork systems, all telecommunications and transmission equipment, China's ZTE doors of equipment manufactured by replaced.

== Operating Branches in Ulaanbaatar ==
- Skytel Plaza
- Skytel Unur
- Skytel Zaluuchuud
- Skytel 4 Zam
- Skytel Narlag
- Skytel Tengis
- Skytel Sky
- Skytel Sansar
- Skytel Dragon
- Skytel Orgil
- Shine Ger /Viva city/

== Operating Branches in other areas ==
- Arhangai
- Bayan-Ulgii
- Baganuur
- Bayanhongor
- Bor Undur
- Bulgan
- Govi-Altai
- Govisumber
- Darhan
- Dornod
- Dundgovi
- Zavhan
- Zuun Haraa
- Nalaih
- Uvurhangai
- Umnugobi
- Sainshand
- Selenge
- Sukhbaatar
- Tarialan
- Toson Tsengel
- Tuv
- Uvs
- Uyanga
- Harhorin
- Hovd
- Huvsgul
- Hujirt
- Hentii
- Erdenet
- Hanbogd
- Tsogttsetsii
