= Information Communications Network =

Telecommunications company of Mongolia

Information Communications Network LLC Netcom
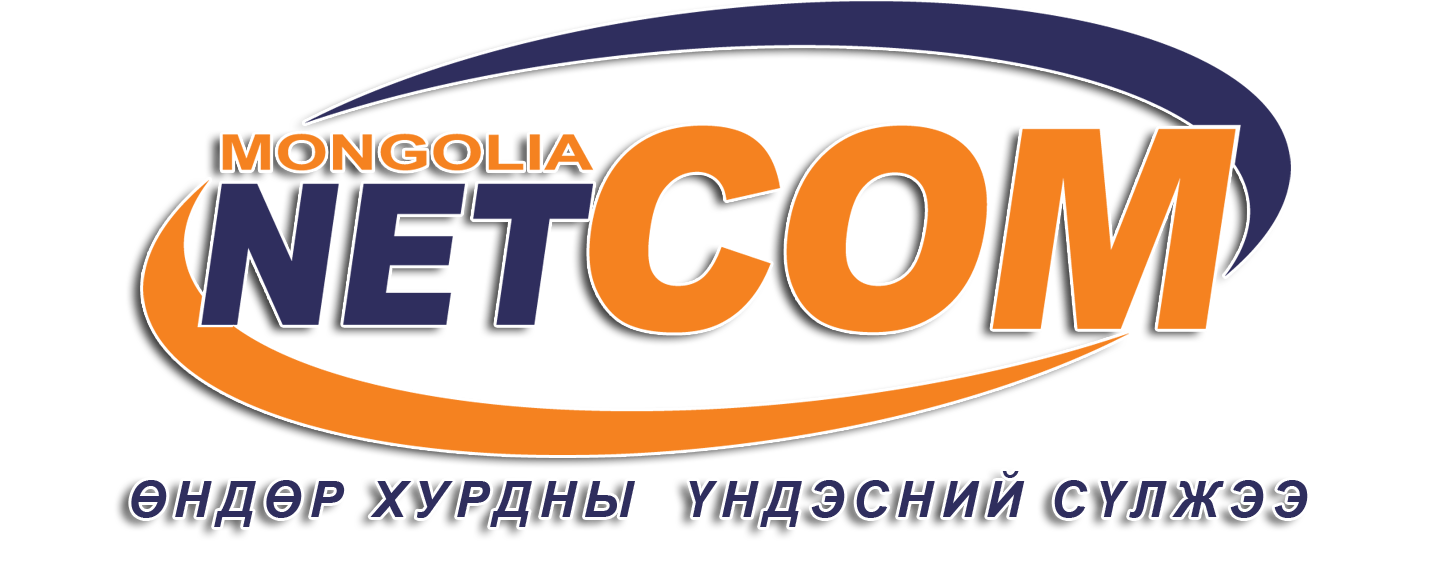
- Company type: State-owned company
- Industry: Telecommunications
- Founded: August 2, 2006; 19 years ago
- Headquarters: Central post Building Peace avenue-1, Chingeltei district Ulaanbaatar-15160, Mongolia
- Key people: Munkhbat Buyandelger, CEO
- Products: Fixed line, Wholesale Internet and Co-allocation services
- Number of employees: 1,200 (2017)
- Website: www.icn.mn

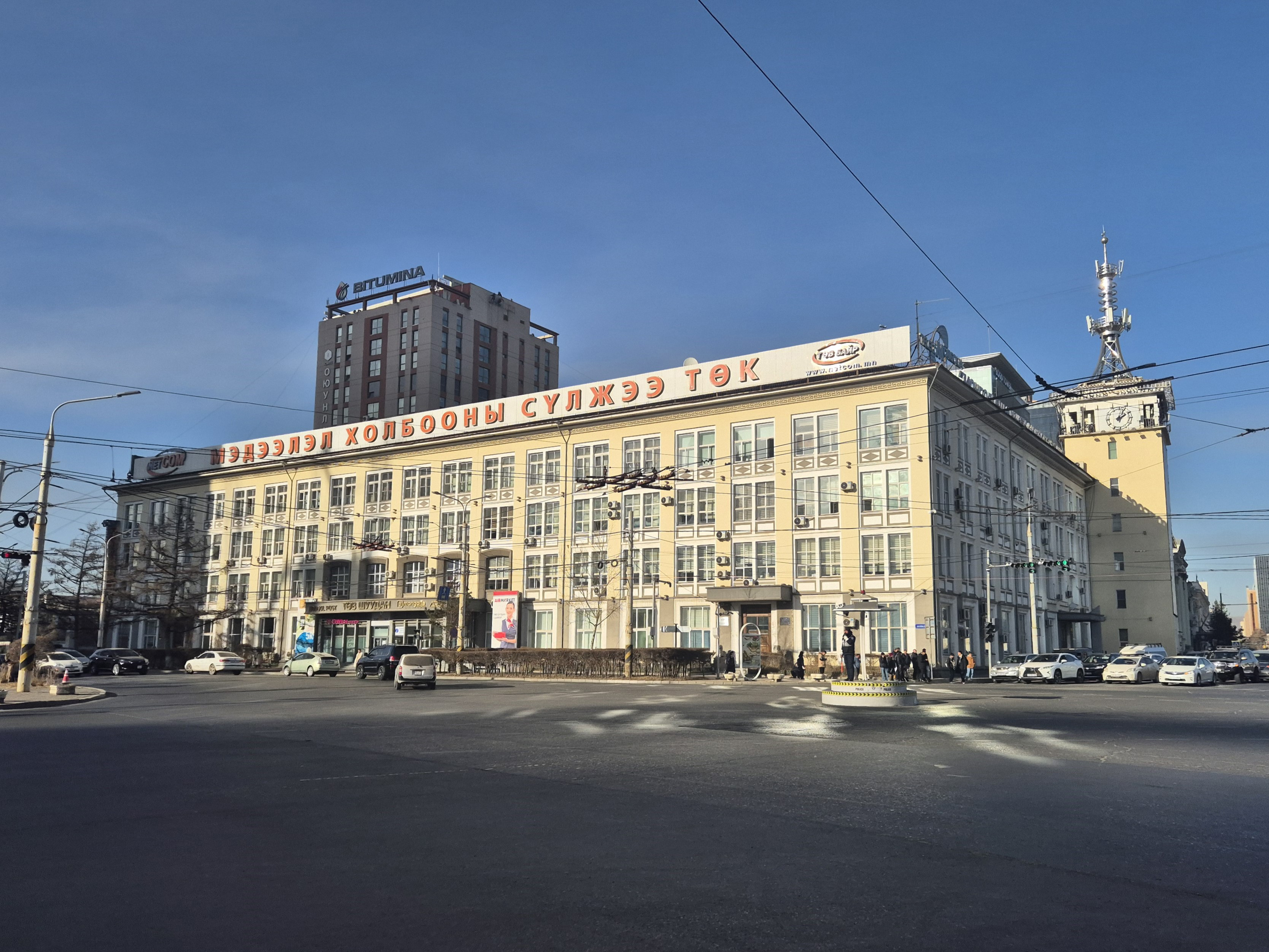
Headquarters at Central post Building

Information Communications Network LLC (Mongolian: Мэдээлэл холбооны сүлжээ ХХК) is a leading provider of broadband services for the carrier marketplace and owner of the largest open access fiber-optic network in Mongolia.

Information Communications Network LLC /ICNC/ was established in 2006 to operate the state owned national backbone network, to ensure secure and reliable operation and maintenance of the network and to provide interoperability and interconnection services to telecoms operators while playing a major role in the ongoing development of Mongolia’s infrastructure.

Information Communications Network LLC operates and maintains 70 percent of the national fiber-optic network, which is routed across 17,421 kilometers, 21 provinces and 283 villages of Mongolia. ICNC offer co-location services to mobile operators and telecoms service providers on their facilities and towers throughout Ulaanbaatar city, 21 provinces and 373 villages of Mongolia.

Information Communications Network LLC is an active sector member of the International Telecommunication Union and the Asia Pacific Telecommunity.
