= UBS Television =

Television broadcaster in Mongolia

- Country: Mongolia
- Broadcast area: Ulaanbaatar
- Headquarters: Ulaanbaatar, Mongolia

History
- Launched: 1992

Links
- Website: www.ubstv.mn

Ulaanbaatar Broadcasting System (UBS; Mongolian: Улаанбаатар телевиз) is a television broadcaster in Mongolia. It operates three channels: UBS is the main channel, accompanied by UBS Global and UBS Music Channel.

It is owned by Balkhjav Lkhagvadorj and Bayar J.

== History ==
UBS Television, formerly Ulzii Television, was founded by Ulaanbaatar City Administration and first aired on 15 September 1992.

In 2002, the City Council became the owner.

In 2007, it was privatized after a three-year agreement to operate under a contract with a private company.

== TV programming ==
- Sumo tournaments
- City News
- Universe Best Songs

== UBS Music Video Awards ==
The last ceremony was held on 29 November 2013 at the State Television and Radio Station.

== See also ==
- Media of Mongolia
- Communications in Mongolia
