= Lao National Television =

TV station

- Type: State television network
- Branding: Lao National Television (TNL LNTV)
- Country: Laos
- First air date: 1 December 1983; 42 years ago
- Availability: Nationwide
- Founded: 1 December 1983; 42 years ago
- Headquarters: Saythany, Vientiane, Laos
- Broadcast area: Laos and some border cities in Thailand
- Owner: Department of Broadcasting
- Parent: Ministry of Information, Culture and Tourism
- Key people: Phoumy Pengsavath
- Launch date: 1 December 1983; 42 years ago
- Analogue channel: LNTV1, LNTV3
- Group: Television
- Official website: https://www.lntv.gov.la
- Language: English, French, Khmer, Thai, Lao

Lao National Television (officially abbreviated as TNL LNTV, Lao: ໂທລະພາບແຫ່ງຊາດລາວ (ສທລ) (ທຊລ), romanized: Tholaphap Haeng Xat Lao) is the national television station of the country of Laos. It is divided into 2 television channels, LNTV1 and LNTV3. The network's logo is based on the national symbol – Pha That Luang. LNTV has broadcast in English, French, Khmu and Lao languages.

== History ==
Long before the creation of LNTV, Laotians had access to overspill television signals from neighboring Thailand.

Lao National Television was established and began broadcasting television programs on December 1, 1983. At that time, the television station carried out pilot broadcasts twice a week, and later gradually increased the broadcast time.

At the beginning of its operations, LNTV broadcast only in Vientiane with Soviet support. Resources to operate the station were poor, coupled by the country's geographic and economical problems, with a small number of viewers having access to the channel and its schedule lasted for an average of two to three hours per evening.

Work for new facilities began on January 12, 2001, with assistance from Vietnam Television.

On September 2, 2015, Lao National Television signed a new cooperation agreement with Vietnam Television, and Lao National Television started producing and broadcasting Vietnamese-language news programs

In September 2019, with the aid of China, LNTV Channel 3 was upgraded from standard definition to high definition.

== Channels ==
Name	Channel	Launched	Broadcasting hours	Ref
LNTV1	VHF 9	1983	05:00-23:00	
LNTV3	UHF 33	1994	05:00-23:00	

== See also ==
- Lao National Radio, an organization that was once affiliated with this television station.
- List of television stations in Southeast Asia#Laos
