= TV5 (Mongolia) =

Television channel of Mongolia

TV5 Mongolia (TV5)

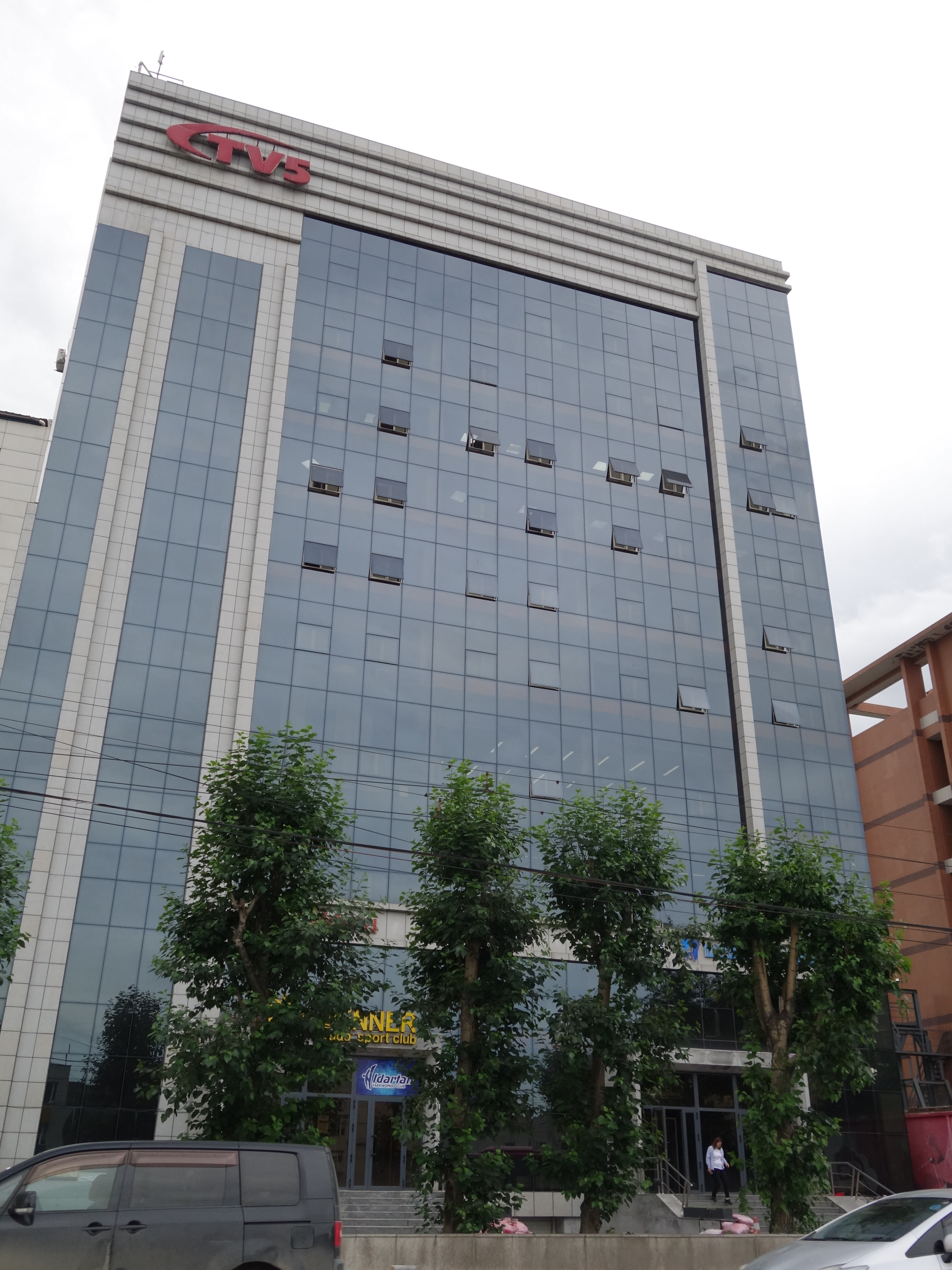
- Country: Mongolia
- Broadcast area: Nationwide
- Headquarters: Ulaanbaatar, Mongolia

History
- Launched: 2003; 23 years ago

Links
- Website: www.tv5.mn

TV5 Mongolia, or TV5, is a television broadcasting station in Mongolia.

The station works closely with the Mongolian National Broadcaster and is financed by advertising, sponsoring, and government subsidies. The program is also available in streaming format online for a fee. This access method is primarily used by Mongolians living abroad.

TV5 started broadcasting in 2003 under the tagline Let's Develop Mongolia (Монгол Улсаа Хөгжүүлье). The station also activated its live stream, airing its programming online between 7pm and midnight, using the RealVideo format. By 2006 it carried Archived Cases (Хавтаст хэрэг), about criminal topics, produced in association with the Mongolian police. In 2007, it aired the country's first home shopping program. In 2016, the channel was owned by Supervision Media Group LLC, according to the Communications Regulatory Commission, however, it is actually owned by Gergen Dalai LLC, a local conglomerate.

As of 2025, the channel's Facebook profile had almost one million followers.

== See also ==
- Media of Mongolia
- Communications in Mongolia
