= NTV (Mongolian TV channel) =

National Television (NTV)
- Country: Mongolia
- Broadcast area: Nationwide
- Headquarters: Ulaanbaatar, Mongolia

Programming
- Picture format: HDTV (1080i)

Ownership
- Owner: Media Group LLC
- Sister channels: N Sports N Movies

History
- Launched: 2006

Links
- Website: http://www.ntv.mn/

National Television (Mongolian: NTV Телевиз), or NTV, is a television broadcaster and TV station in Mongolia. It is a subsidiary of Media Group LLC, a media conglomerate based in Mongolia.

NTV was founded in 2006 and, as of 2016, employs about 100 people. Coverage was limited to Ulaanbaatar from 2009 to 2009, after which it became a national channel; in 2013 it started broadcasting in high definition. Its TV broadcast is mostly in Mongolian with occasional shows in English including one of Mongolia's few English-speaking news teams.

NTV is the third and fourth most popular TV channel in Mongolia in late 2022. It is also affiliated with Neo-Century Radio 107.00 FM.

== Sport broadcasting ==
The list of sports competitions NTV previously broadcast:

- Bundesliga 2010–2020
- Rio Olympics 2016
- Tokyo Olympics 2020
- Los Angeles Olympics 2028
- 2022 Winter Olympics
- 2026 Winter Olympics
- FIFA World Cup 2018
- FIFA World Cup 2026
- 2019 FIBA Basketball World Cup
- 2023 World Figure Skating Championships
- Mongolian national football team matches.

== International TV Shows ==
The list of international TV Shows that NTV made:

- My Wife Rules
- Little Masters
- Chef in Your Ear 4 seasons
- America's Psychic Challenge
- Rolling Kitchen
- Comedy Club (TV program)
- Fridge Wars 2 seasons

== See also ==
- Media of Mongolia
- Communications in Mongolia
