= Japan Consortium =

Joint venture of Japanese broadcasters

The Japan Consortium (ジャパンコンソーシアム, Japan Konsōshiamu) is a joint venture established in 1984 by the Japanese public broadcaster Japan Broadcasting Corporation (NHK) and several commercial television and radio networks under the National Association of Commercial Broadcasters. The Japan Consortium covers broadcasts of the Olympic Games (Summer and Winter), Paralympic Games (Summer and Winter), FIFA World Cup, Asian Games, Asian Para Games, and other major tournaments.

== Participating media outlets ==
=== Television ===
==== Free-to-Air ====
- NHK General TV (AK)
- Fuji TV (CX)
- Nippon TV (AX)
- TBS (RX)
- TV Asahi (EX)
- TV Tokyo (TX)
- UHF independent TV stations

==== Broadcast Satellite ====
- NHK BS
- NHK BS Premium 4K
- BS Asahi
- BS Fuji
- BS TV Tokyo
- BS Nittere
- BS-TBS

=== Radio ===
==== AM ====
- NHK AM Broadcast
- Nippon Broadcasting System (LF)
- Nippon Cultural Broadcasting (QR)
- TBS Radio (TBS)

==== FM ====
- NHK FM Broadcast
- InterFM
- J-Wave (FMJ)
- Tokyo FM (TFM)

==== Shortwave ====
- Radio Nikkei

=== Others ===
- NOTTV (smartphones, 2012 Summer Olympics only)
- TVer
- WOWOW (FIFA World Cup only)
- Tokyo MX (2022 FIFA World Cup and 2026 FIFA World Cup only)

== Coverages ==
=== Summer Olympic Games ===
Date	Presenters/Personalities
2000	TV - Yasuo Fujii (NHK), Masashi Funakoshi (NTV), Masahiro Hayashi (TBS), Eiji Iwasa (NHK), Saburo Kudo (NHK), Shinpei Michiya (NHK), Keikishi Morishita (EX), Yuji Nakamura (ABC), Masakazu Nozaki (CX), Tsuneo Shiobara (CX), Daisuke Shimizu (TBS), Yuichi Tabata (EX), Yashihiro Takeba (NHK), Hiroshi Yamamoto (NHK), Hideharu Yotsuya (TX) Radio - Nobita Hasegawa (QR), Takatoshi Koike (NHK), Fujio Kondo (NHK), Masao Moroka (LF), Shigeru Shiino (TBS)
2004	TV - Masahiro Hayashi (TBS), Hiroshi Ishikawa (NHK), Eiji Iwasa (NHK), Fujio Kariya (NHK), Saburo Kudo (NHK), Haruyuki Kurita (NHK), Hironori Machida (NTV), Shinpei Michiya (NHK), Masaharu Miyake (CX), Keikishi Morishita (EX), Yoshihiko Murayama (NTV), Takao Nakayama (EX), Shunji Noji (NHK), Noboru Okitani (NHK), Shigeru Shiino (TBS), Yashihiro Takeba (NHK), Toshiya Uchiyama (NHK), Tomoki Uekusa (TX) Radio - Kenji Fujimoto (NHK), Keisuke Hatsuta (TBS), Shigeru Matsushima (QR), Takahiro Tanaka (NHK), Jun Tashiro (NHK), Hiroaki Yamanochi (LF), Yoshifumi Yoshimatsu (NHK)
2008	TV - Keisuke Hatsuta (TBS), Kentaro Hirakawa (NTV), Hiroshi Ishikawa (NHK), Keita Ito (NHK), Eiji Iwasa (NHK), Saburo Kudo (NHK), Yasuhiko Matsuno (NHK), Toshiyuki Matsuyama (NHK), Shinpei Michiya (NHK), Keikishi Morishita (EX), Tetsuo Nagasaka (CX), Takao Nakayama (EX), Shunji Noji (NHK), Ken Suzuki (NTV), Yashihiro Takeba (NHK), Yohei Takeshita (CX), Kazuo Tomisaka (NHK), Takahiro Tosaka (TBS), Toshiya Uchiyama (NHK), Tomoki Uekusa (TX) Radio - Masaichi Takahashi (QR), Etsuo Nitta (TBS), Ippei Ohgi (QR), Tetsushi Sakanashi (NHK), Koshi Sanbe (NHK), Takahiro Tanaka (NHK), Tomohiro Ueno (QR), Hideo Yagimatsu (LF), Yoshifumi Yoshimatsu (NHK)
2012	TV - Toshiyuki Doi (TBS), Satoshi Ebihara (NTV), Yasunoe Hirosaka (NHK), Keita Ito (NHK), Yasuhiko Matsuno (NHK), Takao Nakayama (EX), Takahiro Nishioka (CX), Wataru Ogasawara (TBS), Kazuya Saito (TX), Koshi Sanbe (NHK), Junya Shindo (EX), Masaru Sone (NHK), Yohei Takeshita (CX), Kenichiro Tanabe (NTV), Kazuo Tomisaka (NHK), Toshiya Uchiyama (NHK), Tomoki Uekusa (TX), Kenji Watanabe (NHK), Tatsuya Yamaguchi (NHK), Hiroshi Yamamoto (NHK) Radio - Yuji Araikawa (LF), Futoshi Hasegawa (QR), Mitsunori Kemuyama (LF), Masahide Ota (NHK), Tetsushi Sakanashi (NHK), Emiyasu Sato (TBS), Riyo Sugisawa (NHK), Kenjiro Toyohara (NHK)
2016	TV - Toshiyuki Doi (TBS), Fumiyasu Sato (TBS), Ryo Sugisawa (NHK), Kenji Watanabe (NHK), Yasuhiko Matsuno (NHK), Kazuo Tomisaka (NHK), Keita Ito (NHK), Masahide Tada (NHK), Soichiro Mori (CX), Kazushige Fukunaga (CX), Keikichi Morishita (EX), Ryo Kawamura (NTV), Takaki Toriumi (NHK), Kazuya Masuda (TX), Satoshi Nakagawa (TX), Takeshi Tanaka (NTV), Junya Shindo (EX), Kenjiro Toyohara (NHK), Takayuki Miyata (NHK), Yohei Onishi (EX), Tetsushi Sakanashi (NHK), Hiroyuki Sato (NHK), Toshiharu Shimamura (J:COM), Takahito Ishihara (J:COM), Ryoma Asai (NHK), Hideto Inagaki (NHK), Tetsuo Watanabe (J:COM), Mitsuhiro Suzuki (J:COM), Yoshitaka Kitagawa (J:COM) Radio - Etsuo Nitta (TBS), Toshihisa Osaka (NHK), Yuichi Hayase (NHK), Shigeru Matsushima (QR), Ryusuke Ito (TBS), Masao Morooka (LF), Takayuki Tsukamoto (NHK), Kenkichi Yokoi (NHK)
2020	TV - Wataru Ogasawara (TBS), Toshiya Uchiyama (NHK), Hiroshi Takebayashi (NHK), Kengo Nakano (NTV), Tomoki Uekusa (TX), Shoichiro Mori (CX), Kazuo Tomisaka (NHK), Takaki Toriumi (NHK), Tetsuki Sakanashi (NHK), Fumiyasu Sato (TBS), Junya Shindo (EX), Yohei Takeshita (CX), Keita Ito (NHK), Kenji Watanabe (NHK), Takahiro Nishioka (CX), Kazato Kumazaki (TBS), Hiroyuki Sato (NHK), Masaru Sone (NHK), Taisei Kurata (CX), Toshihisa Osaka (NHK), Masahide Ota (NHK), Yasuhiko Matsuno (NHK), Takayuki Miyata (NHK), Mitsuhiro Nakamura (CX), Hideki Sugioka (NHK), Takayuki Tsukamoto (NHK), Yuichi Hayase (NHK), Keisuke Hoshino (NHK), Kenkichi Yokoi (NHK), Hiroshi Sakai (NHK) Radio - Toshiyuki Doi (TBS), Hisatsuku Funaoka (NHK), Takayuki Betsui (NHK), Futoshi Hasegawa (QR), Hiroaki Yamanouchi (LF), Ryoma Asai (NHK), Hideyuki Shimosakai (NHK), Masaichi Takahashi (LF), Yuhei Doi (QR), Yosuke Iizuka (NHK), Hideto Inagaki (NHK), Yuji Araikawa (LF), Ryotaro Tsutsui (NHK)

=== Winter Olympic Games ===
Date	Presenters/Personalities
1998	TV - Hiroshi Akiyama (NHK), Yasuo Fujii (NHK), Masahiro Hayashi (TBS), Fujio Kariya (NHK), Mitsuhiko Kubota (TX), Saburo Kudo (NHK), Takao Masuda (NTV), Ichiro Matsumoto (NHK), Naoki Morinaga (NHK), Masao Nose (NHK), Masakazu Nozaki (CX), Noboru Okitani (NHK), Toshiharu Shimamura (NHK), Yuichi Tabata (EX), Genji Wada (NHK), Suenori Yamashita (NTV), Hiroshi Yamamoto (NHK) Radio - Yasunobu Hirosaka (NHK), Shinichiro Matsumoto (LF), Kazuo Tomisaka (NHK)
2002	Hiroyuki Fukuzawa (NHK), Hiroshi Ishikawa (NHK), Eiji Iwasa (NHK), Fujio Kariya (NHK), Masahiro Kiyohara (TBS), Saburo Kudo (NHK), Hidekimi Kojima (TX), Naoki Morinaga (NHK), Tetsuo Nakasaka (CX), Masao Nose (NHK), Noboru Okitani (NHK), Yasuyuki Onozuka (NHK), Yuichi Tabata (EX), Masaru Tashiro (NHK), Hiroshi Tashiyo (NTV), Kazuo Tomisaka (NHK), Takahiro Tosaki (TBS), Toshiya Uchiyama (NHK), Hiroshi Yamamoto (NHK)
2006	Hiroshi Ishikawa (NHK), Fujio Kariya (NHK), Riyo Kawamura (NTV), Hidekimi Kojima (TX), Shoichiro Mori (CX), Shigeru Obara (NHK), Eiji Okuma (EX), Daisuke Shimizu (TBS), Yashihiro Takeba (NHK), Takahiro Tanaka (NHK), Kazuo Tomisaka (NHK), Nobuo Yoshida (CX)
2010	Takahiko Fujii (NTV), Hiroshi Ishikawa (NHK), Fujio Kariya (NHK), Toshiyuki Matsuyama (NHK), Takahiro Nishioka (CX), Wataru Ogasawara (TBS), Hirohisa Shimada (TX), Junya Shindo (EX), Masaru Sone (NHK), Yashihiro Takeba (NHK), Kazuo Tomisaka (NHK)
2014	Tetsushi Sakanashi (NHK), Masaru Sone (NHK), Shunji Terajima (NTV), Tsuneo Shiobara (CX), Kazuo Tomisaka (NHK), Takaki Toriumi (NHK), Hirohisa Shimada (TX), Etsuo Nitta (TBS), Tatsuya Yamaguchi (NHK), Junya Shindo (EX)
2018	Masaru Sone (NHK), Daisuke Sugaya (NTV), Mitsuhiro Nakamura (CX), Toshihiko Takase (NHK), Takayuki Tsukamoto (NHK), Ryusuke Ito (TBS), Ryusuke Itagaki (TX), Takaki Toriumi (NHK), Yasuhiko Matsuno (NHK), Ryo Kawamura (NTV), Kenjiro Toyohara (NHK), Ryo Sugisawa (NHK), Junya Shindo (EX)
2022	Masaru Sone (NHK), Satoshi Kamishige (NTV), Hiroki Mikami (EX), Takayuki Tsukamoto (NHK), Yosuke Iizuka (NHK), Etsuo Nitta (TBS), Ryusuke Itagaki (TX), Hideki Tanaka (NHK), Keisuke Hoshino (NHK), Mitsuhiro Nakamura (CX), Kazato Kumazaki (TBS), Yoshiaki Sato (NTV)

=== FIFA World Cup ===
Date	Presenters/Personalities
2002	TV - Tetsuo Nagasaka (CX), Shunji Noji (NHK), Teruji Kakuzawa (EX), Haruyuki Kurita (NHK) Radio - Futoshi Hasegawa (QR), Kenji Matsushita (TBS), Koji Ono (LF), Keitaro Sunayama (QR), Masahiro Kiyohara (TBS), Mitsunori Kemuyama (LF)
2006	TV - Teruji Kakuzawa (EX), Shunji Noji (NHK), Tetsuya Aoshima (CX), Haruyuki Kurita (NHK) Radio - Daisuke Shimizu (TBS), Futoshi Hasegawa (QR), Fumiyasu Sato (TBS), Yuji Araikawa (LF), Toshiyuki Doi (TBS)
2010	TV - Fumiyasu Sato (TBS), Toshiya Uchiyama (NHK), Ken Suzuki (NTV), Teruji Kakuzawa (EX), Masaru Sone (NHK), Junya Shindo (EX), Hidekimi Kojima (TX), Tetsuya Aoshima (CX), Jun Tashiro (NHK), Kenichiro Tanabe (NTV), Toshiyuki Doi (TBS), Shunji Noji (NHK), Shinji Yoshino (EX) Radio - Futoshi Hasegawa (QR), Mitsunori Kemuyama (LF), Daisuke Shimizu (TBS)
2014	TV - Ken Shimizu (NTV), Toshiya Uchiyama (NHK), Tetsuya Aoshima (CX), Yoshimi Yoshimatsu (NHK), Toshiyuki Doi (TBS), Junya Shindo (EX), Takaki Toriumi (NHK), Hidekimi Kojima (TX), Junji Terajima (NTV), Ryo Sugisawa (NHK), Shinji Yoshino (EX), Shoichiro Mori (CX), Masaru Sone (NHK), Yasuhiko Matsuno (NHK), Takahiro Nishioka (CX), Fumiyasu Sato (TBS), Hideki Sugioka (NHK), Yasushi Shinya (NTV), Kazuya Saito (TX), Kenichiro Tanabe (NTV), Kenkichi Sakoi (NHK), Mitsuhiro Nakamura (CX), Kengo Nakano (NTV), Suguru Masuda (NHK) Radio - Futoshi Hasegawa (QR), Mitsunori Kemuyama (LF), Etsuo Nitta (TBS)
2018	TV - Shinji Yoshida (EX), Takaki Toriumi (NHK), Tetsuya Aoshima (CX), Takayuki Doi (TBS), Junji Terajima (NTV), Masaru Sone (NHK), Shoichiro Mori (CX), Fumiyasu Sato (TBS), Yasuhiko Matsuno (NHK), Hideki Sugioka (NHK), Isshi Kawahata (NTV), Takahiro Nishioka (CX), Kengo Nakano (NTV), Kenkichi Yokoi (NHK), Shunpei Terakawa (EX), Mitsuhiro Nakamura (CX), Teruyoshi Komiyama (NHK), Shinya Sugiyama (TBS), Hideki Tanaka (NHK), Takeshi Tanaka (NTV), Kazuhiro Mukai (NHK), Naoki Yasumura (NTV), Hiroshi Sakai (NHK), Koji Oana (CX) Radio - Fumiyasu Sato (TBS), Futoshi Hasegawa (QR), Mitsunori Kemuyama (LF), Shigeru Matsushima (QR)
2022	TV - Kazuo Tomisaka (NHK), Yohei Onishi (EX), Hiroshi Sakai (NHK), Tatsuya Aoshima (CX), Hideyuki Shimosakai (NHK), Shunsuke Shimizu (EX), Takahiro Nishioka (CX), Hideyuki Sugioka (NHK), Shunpei Terakawa (EX), Mitsuhiro Nakamura (CX), Masaru Sone (NHK), Hideki Tanaka (NHK), Daiki Minami (EX), Keisuke Yagishita (EX), Yoshihisa Sakanushi (CX), Koki Yamazaki (EX), Shinji Yoshino (EX), Jin Ogasawara (Tokyo MX), Raychell (Tokyo MX), Masahiro Itō (Tokyo MX), Haruka Kudō (Tokyo MX) Radio - Hideto Inagaki (NHK), Daisuke Kasai (NHK), Yoshinori Sasao (NHK), Kenkichi Yokoi (NHK)
