= Mongolian National Broadcaster =

Public service broadcaster in Mongolia

Mongolian National Broadcaster Mongoli‘n Undesny Olon Nytyn Radio Televiz Монголын Үндэсний Олон Нийтийн Радио Телевиз
- Type: Broadcast radio, television and online
- Country: Mongolia
- Availability: National; International
- Headquarters: Ulaanbaatar
- Broadcast area: Mongolia
- Owner: Mongolian public
- Launch date: June 1931; 95 years ago
- Official website: www.mnb.mn

The Mongolian National Broadcaster (MNB); Монголын Үндэсний Олон Нийтийн Радио Телевиз (Mongolian for 'Mongolian National Public Radio and Television'; shortened as МҮОНRТ) is the official, state-funded broadcaster in Mongolia.

== About ==
Mongolian National Public Radio and Television (MNB) is the oldest broadcasting organization in Mongolia as well as the only public service broadcaster in the country. MNB's purpose is to be a leading broadcasting organization that is independent and impartial, and serves for public interests only. Additionally, MNB puts its efforts in promoting Mongolia to the world through its external service broadcasting programs to foreign audiences.

Today MNB is available in over 1.8 million households in Mongolia which is over 90 percent of the entire population.

According to the Law on Public Radio and Television, adopted in 2005, MNB is a non-profit legal entity, which is to carry out a nationwide broadcasting service. Its highest governing body is The National Council of the MNB which consists of 15 members. General management of the organization is run by Director-General who is appointed by the National Council.

== History ==
Interval signal:

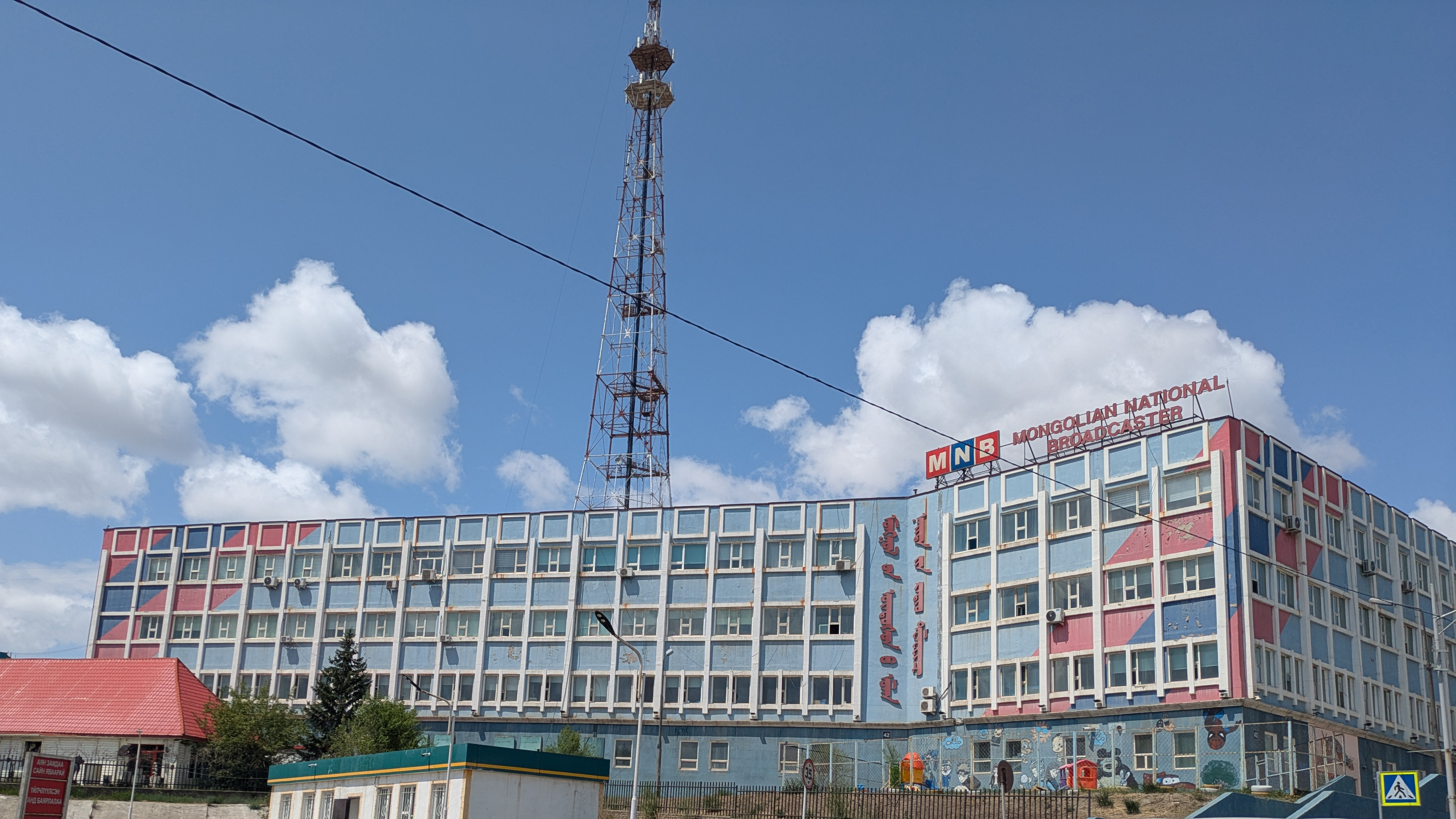
Headquarters in Ulaanbaatar with Mongolian National Public Radio and Television antenna in the background

Broadcasting started in Ulaanbaatar in May/June 1931 and was organized by the Minister of Trade and Industry, Gombyn Sodnom. During the early 1960s, local radio broadcasting for Ulaanbaatar was introduced, and a second national radio channel was established.

Four additional longwave transmitters were opened: 1965 in the western city of Ölgii, 1978 in Altai, Dalanzadgad and Choibalsan. In 1981 the Mörön transmitter started broadcasting on mediumwave. The international shortwave service started in 1964 and was renamed "Voice of Mongolia" in 1997. The Ölgii station also carries local programming in Kazakh. In 2011 Р3 was launched as a youth programme.

Location	Coordinates	Administrative unit	Year of establishment	Frequencies
Chonchor	47°48′00″N 107°11′00″E	Ulaanbaatar	1960	164 kHz (1st program); 7260 kHz (2nd program)
Ölgii	48°57′25″N 89°58′13″E	Bajan-Ölgii	1965	209 kHz (1st program)
Altai	46°19′25″N 96°15′20″E	Gobi-Altai	1978	227 kHz (1st program); 4830 kHz (2nd program)
Dalanzadgad	43°31′55″N 104°24′42″E	Ömnö-Gobi	1978	209 kHz (1st program)
Coibalsan	48°00′17″N 114°27′18″E	Dornod	1978	209 kHz (1st program)
Mörön	49°36′47″N 100°10′07″E	Khövsgöl	1981	882 kHz (1st program); 4895 kHz (2nd program)

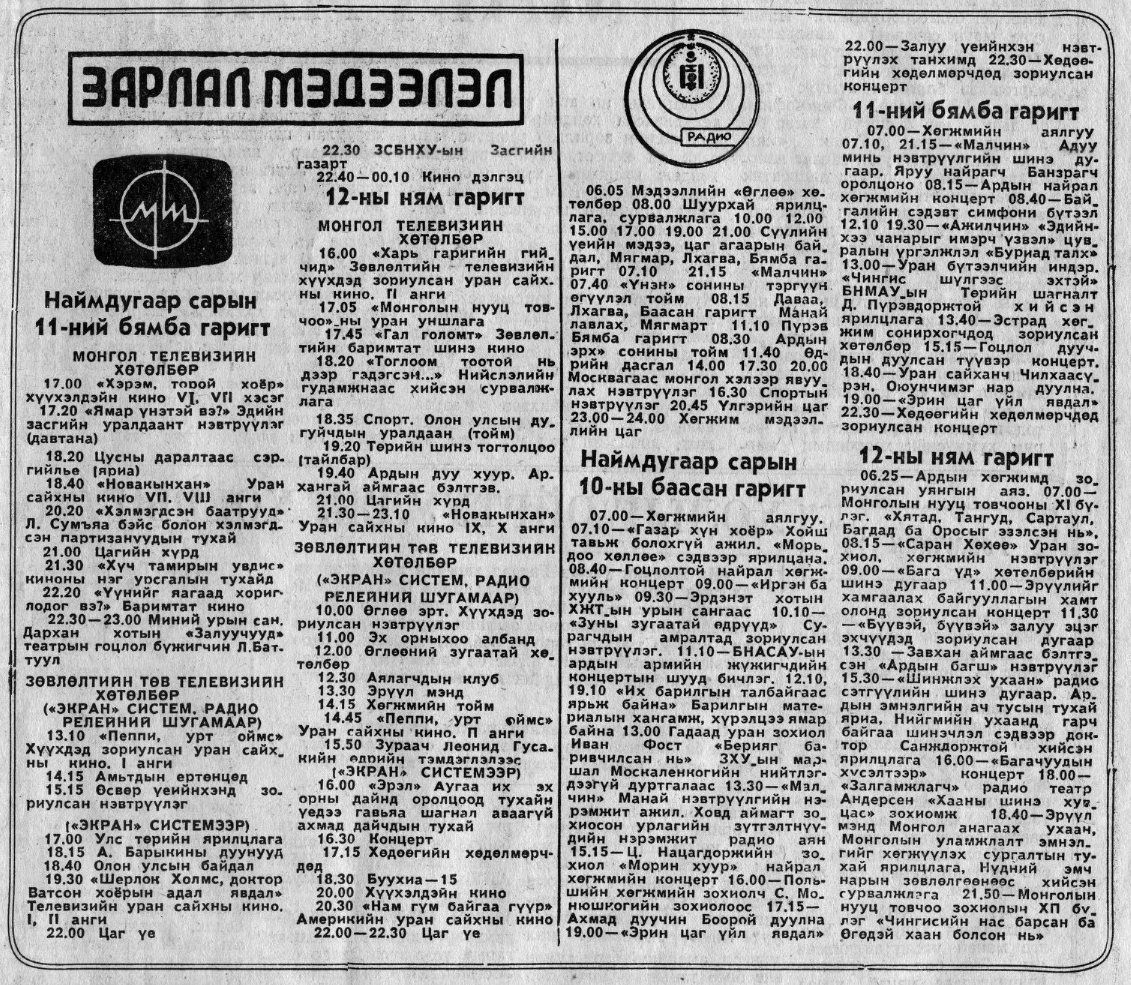
TV and radio program schedule for August 10-12, 1990, featuring the logos of the TV and radio units used at the time.

Television broadcasts started in September 1967, and a second channel was launched in July 2011.

The transmitters are operated by RTBN (Radio and Television Broadcasting Network; Mongolian: РТС, Радио Телевизийн Үндэсний Сүлжээ).

== Services ==
=== Television ===
MNB's television services (Mongolian: Монголын Үндэсний Олон Нийтийн Телевиз) consist of four channels.

- MNB (МҮОНТ-1)
- MNB News (Монголын мэдээ)
- MNB Sport HD (МҮОНРТ-ийн Спорт суваг)
- MNB World (English language channel)

=== Radio ===
MNB's radio services (Mongolian: Монголын Үндэсний Олон Нийтийн Радио) consist of two domestic networks and one international service.

- МҮОНР-1 (Монголын үндэсний олон нийтийн радио), nationwide on longwave, in Ulaanbaatar on FM 106
- Р3 FM, nationwide, in Ulaanbaatar on FM 100.9
- Voice of Mongolia (Монголын дуу хоолой), the international shortwave radio service in seven languages (Mongolian, English, Russian, Japanese, Chinese, Korean, and German)

=== Website ===
- MNB Website (Mongolian: Монголын үндэсний олон нийтийн цахим хуудас)
- Voice of Mongolia (Mongolian: Монголын дуу хоолой)

== Relations ==
Since its foundation the MNB had been working to develop its international relations and co-operate with international broadcasters. In January 1997 it became a full member of the Asia-Pacific Broadcasting Union. As well as broadcasting domestically produced material, it also has program exchanges with Russian Public TV, NHK, CNN, ZDF and Deutsche Welle.

== See also ==
- Inner Mongolia Radio and Television
