= Mass media in Mongolia =

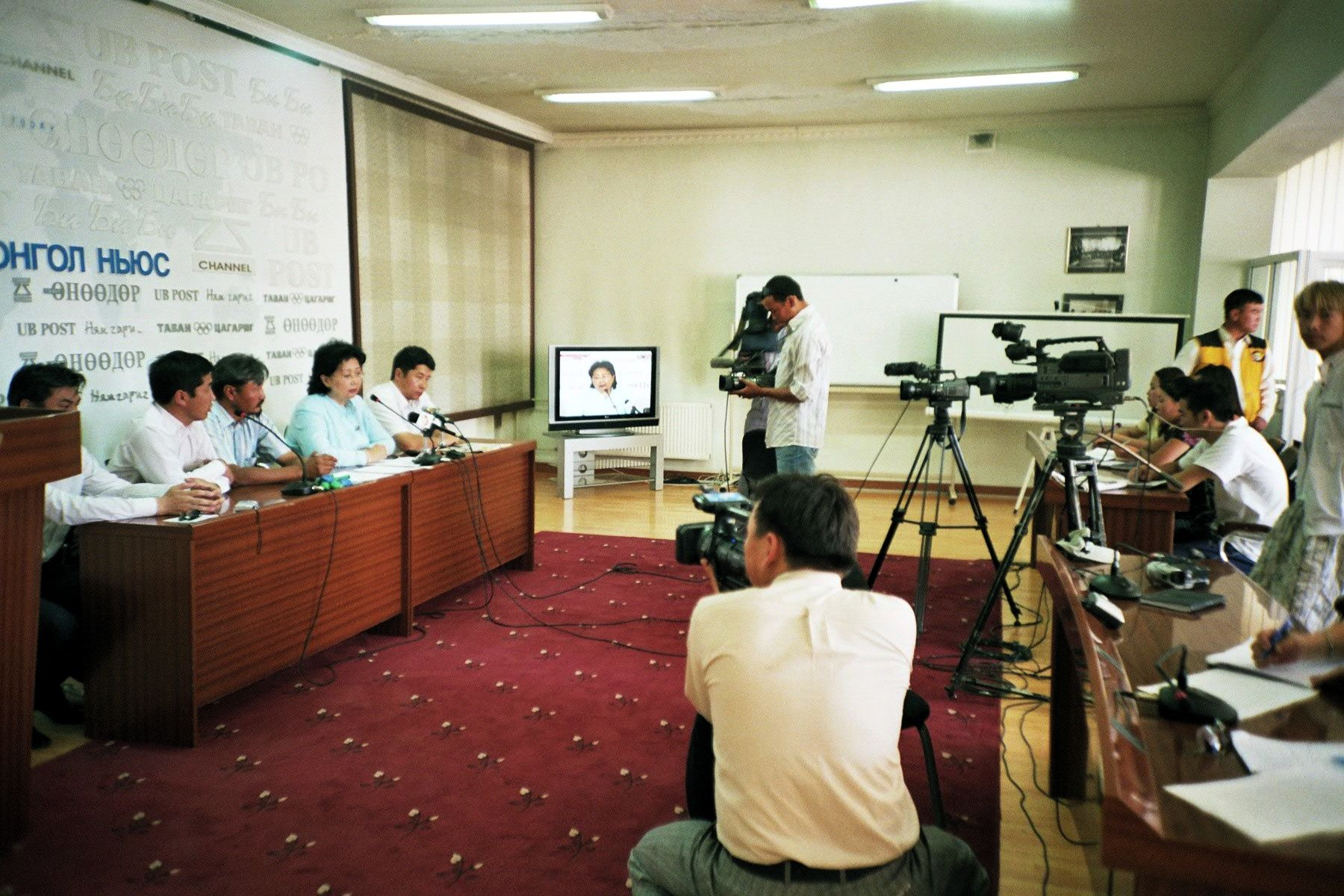
Mongolian media interviewing the opposition Mongolian Green Party. The media has gained significant freedoms since democratic reforms initiated in the 1990s.

The mass media in Mongolia refers to the print, broadcast and online media in Mongolia. Since the collapse of the Soviet style system in 1990, the media has undergone large reforms which have allowed greater diversity and freedom of the press which make it one of the most free in the region. Censorship of media outlets is forbidden under the 1998 Media Freedom Law. In its 2013 report, Reporters Without Borders classified the media environment as 98th out of 179, with 1st being most free.

Despite a population of just three million people, there are 555 media outlets in Mongolia and nearly 5,000 journalists nationwide.

== Press ==
=== History ===
==== 1920–1990s ====
Mongolian press began in 1920 with close ties to the Soviet Union under the Mongolian Communist Party, with the Unen (Truth) newspaper similar to the Soviet Pravda and Dzaluuchuudyn Unen (Young People's Truth), founded by the Central Committee of the Revolutionary Youth League in 1924; and Ulaan Od (Red Star) founded by the Ministries of Defense and Public Security following respectively in 1930. Until reforms in the 1990s, the government had strict control of the media and oversaw all publishing, in which no independent media was allowed. For 70 years, the sole source of information for the population was the state-run Mongolian National Broadcaster. The dissolution of the Soviet Union had a significant impact on Mongolia, where the one-party state grew into a multi-party democracy, and with that, media freedoms came to the forefront.

==== 1990s–present ====
A new law on press freedom, drafted with help from international NGOs on August 28, 1998 and enacted on January 1, 1999, paved the way for media reforms. The Mongolian media currently consists of around 300 print and broadcasting outlets. The press, in all forms, carries criticism of the government and "heavy-handed" police tactics during demonstrations, though journalists remain at risk of laws criminalising defamation and reporting on "state secrets". Despite laws against censorship, a small number of outlets were censored that reported on corruption of government officials, which have often led the opposition to accuse the governing Mongolian People's Revolutionary Party of using the media to ensure its success in elections. The government encourages press freedom; head of government Miyegombo Enkhbold spoke of “journalists who fight social injustice and work hard to develop a free press”. To avoid libel offenses, the independent media undergo a degree of self-censorship. Globe International, an independent media watchdog, was set up in 1999 in the capital which aims to protect media freedom and expression.

Since 2006, the media environment has been improving with the government having passed a new Freedom of Information Act, and the removal of any affiliation of media outlets with the government. Market reforms have led to an increasing number of people working in the media year on year, along with students at journalism schools. Though reforms are continuing, the legal system offers little protection for journalists who criticise government officials. The Globe International organisation conducted a study between 2001 and 2005 which found that 60% of legal cases were lost by the media, with 10% winning and 32% settling the case. The Press Institute of Mongolia conducts and publishes the "Monitoring Mongolian Media" survey, outlining the current status of the media.

Journalists remain at risk under laws criminalizing defamation and reporting on state secrets. In 2024 Narangiin Unertsetseg, editor of the zarig.mn news site, was sentenced to 4 years and 9 months after a closed trial on charges including tax evasion, spreading false information and violating privacy.

== Newspapers ==
The oldest newspaper is Unen, meaning truth, founded in 1920 and has around 200,000 subscribers, making it one of the most read daily newspapers. The Mongol Messenger, published by the state-run Montsame, is favoured by government officials and circulated in government offices and overseas embassies, whereas private publications are widely read by expatriates and English speaking Mongolians and Western businesses. Papers and journals are also produced by political parties, the army, trade unions and by artistic, cultural, scientific and literary organisations. Given the high level of literacy rates in the country (97.8% according to 2000 census), newspaper and journal circulation is often small, though it is increasing. The population's preference to newspapers is among the highest in the world, with 68% preferring newspapers to other forms of media. As with state run television and radio, state owned papers have become privatised. Two state-owned leading dailies, Ardiin Erkh and Zasgiin Gazariin, were sold to the public in 1999 as part of the 1998 law.

== Television and radio ==
Under a law passed in 2005, prominent Mongolian state-run radio and television became a public service broadcaster. Radio remains the most important medium, particularly for dispersed herdsman in the countryside. There are a large number of radio stations, both national and foreign, mainly based in Ulaanbaatar. Around 115 FM and 7 AM stations were on air in 2006, including the BBC World Service, Voice of America and other foreign stations. Radio broadcasts are in Mongolian, Russian and English. Independent television has had a smaller impact compared to the former state run channel due to financial limitations, though private radio has had more success in the countryside which was once dominated by state radio. Satellite television is also growing in popularity, with 15 cable operators and up to 90 cable channels, including CNN, BBC, National Geographic Channel and news programmes from China, Russia, India, Japan, South Korea and many European countries. According to 2014 Asian Development Bank survey, 80% of Mongolians cited TV as their main source of information.

== Internet ==
The Internet, established in 1995 in Mongolia, is not restricted by the government, but has yet to make a significant impact, with only 16% of the population having access to it as of 2012. In 2012 there were around 521,520 users and 20,084 Internet hosts. There has been steady online growth in online newspapers, magazines and advertising. For example, the first ever Mongolia Weekly newsletter brings exclusive analysis and news in English.

== See also ==
- Communications in Mongolia
