= Pedro De Pool =

Cuban-American radio personality and actor

- Born: Pedro Valentín De Pool; February 14, 1945 (age 80); Havana, Cuba
- Occupation(s): Actor, radio personality, television host
- Years active: 1965–present

Pedro Valentín De Pool (born February 14, 1945) is a Cuban radio personality, actor, and former television host. From 2006 until 2013, De Pool has been a part of the radio newscast team for Radio y Televisión Martí. In television, he is best remembered as the co-host of Sabado Gigante from 1986 until 1991.

== Early life ==
De Pool was born and raised in Havana, Cuba. In 1960, at age 15, he moved to Miami, Florida and was drafted into the U.S. Army three years later.

== Career ==
De Pool's first film role was in the 1967 Juan Orol-directed film La Virgen de la Calle. In 1982, he went on to guest-star as a master of ceremonies in an episode of the anthology series American Playhouse, and also appeared in a 1985 episode of the NBC series Miami Vice. He also had other minor roles in films such as Invasion U.S.A. (1985) and Midnight Crossing (1988).

In 1986, De Pool joined the cast of the long-running variety show Sabado Gigante on Univision, co-hosting alongside Don Francisco and Rolando Barral. Barral left the show shortly afterwards and De Pool remained the only co-host until abruptly leaving in 1991, when he was replaced by Javier Romero.

De Pool played the role Captain Mendoza in the 1988 film Midnight Crossing, and also played Adolfo in the HBO film Clinton and Nadine, which was released that same year.

From 2006 until 2013, De Pool worked as a news reporter for the internationally broadcast Radio y Televisión Martí.

== Personal life ==
De Pool currently resides in Miami, Florida. He has two children, five grandchildren, and one great-granddaughter.

== Filmography ==
=== Film ===
Year	Title	Role	Notes
1967	La Virgen de la Calle	Juan	
1985	Invasion U.S.A.	uncredited role	
1988	Midnight Crossing	Captain Mendoza	
2006	Porkchop and a Glass of Water	Nicky	

=== Television ===
Year	Title	Role	Notes
1982	American Playhouse	Emcee	Episode: "For Colored Girls Who Have Considered Suicide/When the Rainbow Is Enuf"
1985	Miami Vice	Jose Ruiz	Episode: "The Maze"
1986–1991	Sabado Gigante	Co-host	
1988	Clinton and Nadine	Adolfo	Television film
2006–2013	Radio y Televisión Martí	Newscaster	Radio and television
