= Atrapa los Millones =

Chilean game show

- Also known as: Million Dollar Money Drop
- Genre: Game show
- Developed by: Endemol
- Presented by: Don Francisco (2012-2014); Diana Bolloco (2015)
- Theme music composer: ispy music
- Country of origin: Chile
- Original language: Spanish
- No. of seasons: 4

Production
- Production location: Canal 13 Studios
- Running time: 60 minutes (including adverts)

Original release
- Network: Canal 13
- Release: March 25, 2012 – May 1, 2015

Related
- The Million Pound Drop

Atrapa los Millones: La apuesta de tus sueños (English translation: Catch the Millions: The gamble of your dreams), formerly Atrapa los Millones: La apuesta de tu vida (English translation: Catch the Millions: The gamble of your life) was a Chilean game show which aired on Canal 13. It was based on the original British format The Million Pound Drop. However, unlike the original British version, it was not broadcast live, and there were several changes to the format. The show premiered in March 2012, and was hosted by Don Francisco from seasons 1-3 until March 2015, when the 4th season premiered being hosted by Diana Bolocco. Additionally, Sergio Lagos hosted the last twelve episodes of that season, which Canal 13 decided not to air.

Once the money is in place, the trap doors for the incorrect answers are opened, and the cash on them falls out of sight and is lost. The contestants then continue the game using the cash they had placed on the correct answer. They get to keep whatever money is left after the seventh question; if they lose everything before reaching this point, the game ends immediately and they leave with nothing.

| Question(s) | Answer choices | Time limit |
|---|---|---|
| 1–3 | 4 | 60 seconds |
| 4–6 | 3 | 60 seconds |
| 7 | 2 | 75 seconds |

== Quick Change ==
The contestants may use one "Cambio rápido" (Quick Change) lifeline during the game, on any question except the seventh. This feature allows them an extra 30 seconds to distribute their cash among the trap doors. If none of the trapdoors are left open and the contestants still have the Quick Change, it will automatically be used.

== Final Fact ==
For the seventh question, after the time runs out, the host reveals a piece of information about the answers. They then have 30 seconds to switch their answer or leave the money where it is.

== The set ==
During the first three seasons, the show's set was a faithful imitation of the American version, but in the first season the set's elements were changed to emulate British version. Making a reference to this change, host Diana Bolocco wore a red dress in the commercial advert of the show, emulating the host of British version Davina McCall.

== See also ==
- The Million Pound Drop Live
