= Unicast Company =

Unicast
- Type: Publicly held
- Industry: Internet Marketing
- Founded: New York City, New York (1999)
- Headquarters: New York City, New York
- Website: www.unicast.com

Unicast was the internet marketing and advertising technology group of Enliven Marketing Technologies Corporation (Nasdaq: ENLV). It provided services for agencies, advertisers and publishers to create, deploy and measure the performance of what they called "Premium Rich Media" (PRM) digital ad campaigns. Unicast was founded in 1999 and opened its first European office in the UK in September 2007. Enliven was later acquired by DG, who were in turn acquired in 2008 by Extreme Reach.

== Products and services ==
Unicast's PRM platform provided interactive applications that incorporated 3D, video and Flash components. It was the first "rich media" provider to employ HD3D technology in online ad campaigns. In December 2007, Warner Bros. began employing rich media to promote its DVD releases on the web.

This Unicast ad suite of products was delivered using the Unicast Ad Platform (UAP). The UAP is utilized as a full-service tool and self-service tool. This was delivered by the Unicast Ad Operations group, who managed the service including media planning, buying, creative production and data analysis on behalf of the client. As a self-service application publishers and agencies could deploy and manage the campaign process on their own. Each self-service customer received access to Unicast's media planners, product developers, campaign managers and 24/7 access to technical support. Unicast delivered this data to clients. In 2008, the company planned to introduce an updated version of the index that will add new interaction metrics and allow clients to custom-weight the data to match their goals.

== Awards ==
In June 2007, Unicast was awarded the Stevie Award for "Best Online Ad Campaign in the 2007 International Business Awards".
