= Vestron Pictures =

American film studio and distributor

Vestron Pictures Inc.
- Type: Division
- Industry: Film industry
- Genre: Various
- Founded: 1986; 40 years ago
- Founder: Steve Tisch; Lawrence Turman; Gene Kirkwood
- Defunct: 1992; 34 years ago
- Fate: Parent company filed for Chapter 11 bankruptcy, assets acquired by LIVE Entertainment
- Successor: Lionsgate Films
- Headquarters: Chicago, Illinois, United States
- Key people: Austin O. Furst Jr.
- Products: Motion pictures
- Owner: Vestron, Inc.
- Parent: Vestron, Inc. (1986–1991); LIVE Entertainment (1991–1992)

Vestron Pictures Inc. was an American film studio and distributor, a former division of Austin O. Furst, Jr.'s Vestron Inc., that is best known for their 1987 release of Dirty Dancing.

Vestron also has had a genre film division, Lightning Pictures, a spin-off of Vestron's Lightning Video, headed by Lawrence Kasanoff, who would later go on to found Lightstorm Entertainment and Threshold Entertainment.

== History ==
The company was initially kicked off to "pursue projects" with top producers, namely Steve Tisch, Larry Turman and Gene Kirkwood, and Vestron would have to finance projects, and do a decided number of series and relationships. The first Vestron Pictures film released was Malcolm, the Australian feature film that launched a New York run on July 18, 1986.

On October 1, 1986, Vestron Pictures and Gotham-based financial outfit Integrated Resources, Inc. established a $100 million joint venture to handle underwriting of the production and distribution of 15 Vestron Pictures feature films produced in-house, which planned to be released from 1987 to 1989.

In December 1986, Vestron Pictures planned to produce ten films and to acquire 10-15 films in order to become a virtual low-budget film studio, and gave production budgets of under $2 million to the Lightning Pictures genre label, as titles from the mainstream label ran $2–6 million; the company was relegated to low-budget production without resorting to exploitation filmmaking, and shot for a broad base that expanded into all segments of the viewing audience.

In 1987, the Vestron Pictures unit acquired worldwide rights to Bob Balaban's Parents, from production company Parents Productions, and Roger Holzberg's Midnight Crossing, from another independent production company, Team Effort Productions, with another Vestron subsidiary, Interaccess Film Distribution, to handle foreign sales and distribution rights for the two pictures.

In September 1987, upon the success of the company's biggest hit, Dirty Dancing, Vestron acquired 24 productions and pickups that were slated for release throughout 1988, and toward that end, the company unveiled four productions before the end of the year, as well as four acquisitions, and called for quality pictures with budgets of $6 million.

In October 1987, Vestron Pictures bought the rights to two films from production company Double Helix Films, Mace and Funland. Vestron would handle theatrical, television, pay cable and syndicated TV rights to the former, and home video, cable and TV rights to the latter film, and Double Helix Films would retain the rights to the two films for foreign distribution.

In November 1987, Vestron Pictures was seeking to expand theatrical operations in Australia and the Benelux countries. The company already had distribution offices in the U.K. and Japan, and would cooperate with Vestron's international sales subsidiary, Interaccess Film Distribution. It decided not to set up shop in France due to declining theatrical attendance and a glut of cinemas, some of which formed a crowded field in the nation.

Vestron Pictures' parent company, Vestron, Inc., filed for Chapter 11 Bankruptcy and went out of business in 1992, with their assets being acquired by LIVE Entertainment. Today, Lionsgate owns the rights to the Vestron library after acquiring Artisan Entertainment in 2003.

== Productions ==
=== Vestron Pictures ===
Release date	Title	Notes
July 20, 1986	Malcolm	US distribution only
November 14, 1986	Slaughter High	
November 1986	Billy Galvin	
February 20, 1987	Alpine Fire	
April 10, 1987	Gothic	US distribution only
May 1987	Nightforce	Direct-to-video
May 15, 1987	Personal Services	
August 21, 1987	Dirty Dancing	Inducted into the National Film Registry in 2024
September 25, 1987	China Girl	
October 2, 1987	Anna	
November 6, 1987	Steel Dawn	
December 1987	The Family	US distribution only
December 18, 1987	The Dead	
1988	Dangerous Curves	
January 22, 1988	Promised Land	
March 4, 1988	And God Created Woman	
April 8, 1988	The Pointsman	
April 22, 1988	The Unholy	
May 6, 1988	Salome's Last Dance	
May 13, 1988	Midnight Crossing	
May 20, 1988	Call Me	
June 3, 1988	The Beat	
June 17, 1988	Waxwork	
June 1988	Paramedics	
August 12, 1988	Young Guns	International theatrical and worldwide home video distribution only, 20th Century Fox owned North American theatrical rights
October 14, 1988	The Lair of the White Worm	
November 25, 1988	Amsterdamned	US distribution only
December 23, 1988	Burning Secret	
January 27, 1989	Parents	
February 17, 1989	Paperhouse	US distribution only
March 3, 1989	Dream a Little Dream	
March 1989	Big Man on Campus	
April 28, 1989	The Fruit Machine	US distribution only
May 5, 1989	The Rainbow	
May 12, 1989	Earth Girls Are Easy	US distribution only
June 29, 1989	Twister	
August 25, 1989	Little Monsters	Vestron produced the film but sold the film to United Artists due to financial problems.
December 1, 1989	Hider in the House	
December 8, 1989	Cat Chaser	
February 4, 1990	Spies on Ice	
March 28, 1990	Paint It Black	Direct-to-video
April 3, 1990	Catchfire	
July 15, 1990	Fear	
November 9, 1990	Love Hurts	
October 23, 1991	Sundown: The Vampire in Retreat	Direct-to-video
January 29, 1992	Enid Is Sleeping	
July 29, 1992	Spies Inc.	released on VHS in 1992 by LIVE Home Video, under the name Code Name: Chaos

=== Lightning Pictures ===
Release date	Title	Notes
July 10, 1987	Blood Diner	
September 16, 1987	Street Trash	
June 30, 1989	Far From Home	
September 27, 1989	C.H.U.D. II: Bud the C.H.U.D.	
March 16, 1990	Blue Steel	Eventually acquired and released by Metro-Goldwyn-Mayer due to financial problems
May 11, 1990	Class of 1999	released by Taurus Entertainment Company
September 18, 1991	Ghoulies III: Ghoulies Go to College	released by Taurus Entertainment Company
January 17, 1992	A Gnome Named Gnorm	
