= The Million Peso Money Drop =

- Title card
- Genre: Game show
- Developed by: Endemol
- Written by: Paolo Bustamante
- Directed by: Bert de Leon
- Presented by: Vic Sotto
- Theme music composer: ispy music
- Country of origin: Philippines
- Original language: Tagalog
- No. of seasons: 1
- No. of episodes: 19

Production
- Executive producer: Lian Garcia-Tayona
- Production location: Broadway Centrum
- Running time: 60 minutes
- Production company: Endemol

Original release
- Network: TV5
- Release: October 14, 2012 – February 17, 2013

Related
- The Million Pound Drop Live; Million Dollar Money Drop

The Million Peso Money Drop is a Philippine television game show broadcast by TV5. The show is based on the original British formatThe Money Drop. Hosted by Vic Sotto, It aired from October 14, 2012, to February 17, 2013, replacing Who Wants to Be a Millionaire? and was replaced by Sine Ko 5ingko. The show aired every Sundays, 8:30 pm (UTC+8).

== Format ==
=== Gameplay ===
A pair with a pre-existing relationship is given ₱1 million, split into 40 bundles of ₱25,000 in ₱20 bills, at the beginning of the game. Contestants are presented with multiple-choice questions, typically either general knowledge or current events.

The contestants select one of the two categories presented at the beginning of each round. Each answer option is shown, which corresponds to a different trapdoor, known as a "drop". Among the presented options, only one answer is correct. The question is then revealed and the contestants are given a few seconds to discuss their answer. They are given 60 seconds to place all their money on the corresponding trapdoor of the answer they deem correct. However, if they are unsure of the correct answer, they may distribute their money among the drops as they see fit, but they must leave one drop clear without any money. Any bundles of money not placed on any drop at the end of 60 seconds are forfeited. The contestants may choose to stop the clock before the timer is up if they are satisfied with their choice of answers.

After the timer either runs out or is stopped, the host asks the contestants to "Step forward.", followed by the catchphrase, "Let's do the drop!". The drops for the incorrect answers are either opened altogether or one by one. Any money placed on these drops falls down the chute and is removed from the game by the security guards below the stage. Meanwhile, any money placed on the drop with the correct answer is carried over to the next question.

The process repeats until the contestants either run out of money and lose, or successfully answer the final question and win any remaining money.

The number of answers vary throughout the game as show below:

Question No.	No. of answers
1–4	4
5–7	3
8	2

=== Quick Change ===
The contestants may use the "Quick Change" once during their entire game on any question except the eighth. This gives the contestants an additional 30 seconds to discuss and redistribute their cash among the trapdoors if needed. They may also distribute any money left unplaced on any trapdoor when the 60-second timer ran out.

== See also ==
- List of TV5 (Philippine TV network) original programming
