= Sábado Gigante =

Spanish-language variety show (1962–2015)

- Also known as: Show Dominical (1962–1963 Chile); Sábados Gigantes (1963–1992 Chile); Sábado Gigante (1986-2015 U.S.)
- Created by: Don Francisco
- Presented by: Don Francisco; Rolando Barral (1986-1988); Pedro De Pool (1988–1991); Javier Romero (1991–2015)
- Countries of origin: Chile (1962–1992); United States (1986–2015)
- Original language: Spanish
- No. of seasons: 53

Production
- Camera setup: Multi-camera
- Running time: Approx. 2 hours, 15 minutes (without commercials); 3 hours (with commercials); 4 hours (1986–2001, with commercials)

Original release
- Network: Canal 13
- Release: August 5, 1962 – December 26, 1992
- Network: Univision; Las Estrellas
- Release: April 12, 1986 – September 19, 2015

Related
- Siempre Niños; Don Francisco Te Invita; Gigantes con Don Francisco

Sábado Gigante (English translation: "Giant Saturday" or "Gigantic Saturday"; known officially as Sábado Gigante Internacional outside Chile) was a Spanish-language television variety show. It originated from Chile in 1962, where it was broadcast on Canal 13. Beginning in 1986, it was broadcast in the United States by Spanish International Network (SIN), later renamed Univisión. It was Univision's longest-running program and the longest-running television variety series in world television history. Sábado Gigante is an eclectic and frenetic mix of various contests, human-interest stories, and live entertainment. Throughout its run, the show was hosted by Mario Kreutzberger under the stage name of Don Francisco. Rolando Barral and Pedro De Pool began serving as a co-hosts in 1986; that role was taken over by Javier Romero in 1991.

The three-hour program aired on Univision each Saturday at 8:00 p.m. (7:00 p.m. from 1987 to 2001). A new episode was produced every week throughout the show's history, with no reruns and only rare preemptions due to special programming (most notably by Teletón USA, an annual 24-hour telethon held each December, which Kreutzberger has hosted since its inception in 2012).

== Broadcast history ==
The first advertisement of Sabado Gigantes first episode as Show Dominical

Kreutzberger originated the weekly program on August 5, 1962, airing on Canal 13 in Chile as Show Dominical ("Sunday's Show"). He had been inspired by television shows he had seen in the United States and Argentina but, as he explained, "My idea was mixing all the programs that I saw into one program."

The program's broadcasts were subsequently moved to Saturdays, and henceforth, was renamed Sábados Gigantes in 1963 and quickly developed a loyal following in Chile, and then throughout Latin America. In Chile, during the 1970s and 1980s, the show reached peak audiences of 80%. During this period, some episodes of the program lasted up to eight hours.

In its early years, the series was broadcast live with the exception of short segments; notable among the pre-taped segments was the travelogue, where Kreutzberger visited different locations around the world.

On April 12, 1986, Kreutzberger and the program moved to Miami, Florida where it began to be produced by the Spanish International Network, now Univision (originally by their Miami affiliate, WLTV). At that time, the show's title was changed to the singular Sábado Gigante, although some longtime fans in Chile still call it by the pluralized title. On June 18, 2005, the series celebrated its 1,000th episode on Univisión, and on May 20, 2006, it celebrated its 20th anniversary in the U.S. and on May 21, 2011, it celebrated its 25th anniversary on the Univision. On October 27, 2012, Sábado Gigante celebrated its 50th anniversary (counting both its runs in Chile and the U.S.).

For the Univision program, from its inception until 2001, the broadcast began at 7:00pm ET, with the "first hour" (from 1996 to 2001) usually revolving around a theme and marketed under an alternate name (e.g. Amor Gigante, Sorpresa Gigante, Tutti Frutti Gigante, Fiesta Gigante among others). This first hour was exclusive to Univision and was not used in international broadcasts.

For several years, two programs were recorded each week from identical sets:

- One in Miami, Florida for broadcast in most Latin American countries, as well as Australia, Canada, and Europe.
- One in Santiago, Chile for broadcast in that country (Kreutzberger's home country).

In 2000, the show was remotely broadcast from Los Angeles to coincide with the Mexican Independence Day celebrations. In June 2010, the final hour of the show was again remotely broadcast at the Home Depot Center in Carson, California to celebrate the start of the 2010 FIFA World Cup.

In 2011, the show aired a special three-hour telethon benefiting the American Red Cross' efforts to aid the victims of the 2010 Haiti earthquake.

On April 17, 2015, Univision announced that Sábado Gigante would end after 53 years, with its final episode (titled Sábado Gigante: Hasta Siempre; English translation: "Giant Saturday: Forever") airing on September 19, 2015. Present at the show were former members of "Clan Infantil" and the current host of the Univision magazine "Primer Impacto" Pamela Silva Conde, the soap opera actress Sherlyn, the Univision Radio host José Felipe Padrón, "Primer Impacto" correspondent Tony Dandrades, actor and singer Eduardo Antonio, the Venezuelan singer Karolina con K and Zuleyka Rivera, Miss Universe 2006 and current presenter of the UniMás program "La Revista de Zuleyka", among others.

The final episode was broadcast live simultaneously in Chile, Mexico, and the U.S.

== Regular segments ==
=== El Chacal de la Trompeta ("La Gran Oportunidad") ===
One of the show's signature segments, six contestants are given the chance to sing a song, with the bad performers being eliminated mid-song by "El Chacal de la Trompeta" (lit, "the Jackal of the Trumpet"), a ghost-like character who blows an old trumpet to end such acts (similar to The Gong Show). Unlike The Gong Show, El Chacal does not have to wait a specific amount of time before eliminating someone (on many occasions, contestants have been eliminated almost immediately after beginning their performance). Don Francisco would join in, and wear silly hats and wigs to intimidate the contestant. From 2000 to 2006, the eliminated performer would also be "fed" to a lion in his cave, with Don Francisco chanting "A los leones" (in addition to the usual "y....fuera!" chant). The "Lion" character was later phased out and would be "replaced" with an Alex the Lion doll. The "surviving" performers are voted on by the audience, with the one receiving the most applause winning a prize or cash (in this case, $1,000). The performer also has the chance to win an additional $1,000 by acquiring "La Corona", which would pre-qualify that performer for the "Reyes del Chacal" competition, which was held every two to four years (although this competition had not been held since 2010). From 1987 to 1993, any performer who advanced also received a six-pack of Coca-Cola.

A running gag of this segment occurs whenever Don Francisco sings during this segment, El Chacal would blow the trumpet mid-song, effectively insulting the host, who responds by kicking El Chacal. He would also kick the character if a bad call was made. Another running gag also had an attractive female performer "automatically" advancing before even singing.

El Chacal's antics are more in line with such, similar to a laughing hyena. However, there is a bit darker (or dark humor) meaning behind the character and his appearance. He actually has more similarities to an "Executioner" or a "Hooded Hatchetman", who used to kill people on the gallows or guillotine while wearing such a mask. Only in this case, he "kills off" acts of performers by playing the trumpet and not wielding an axe or guillotine.

In November 2013, Leonardo Núñez Guerrero, the man who played El Chacal for more than 20 years, was fired from the show by Don Francisco.

=== Miss Colita ===
A parody of beauty pageants, six women compete in swimsuits or other revealing attire for the title of Miss Colita. It is similar to the Brazilian contest "Miss Bumbum". The contest is usually held the Saturday before the Miss Venezuela, Miss USA and Miss Universe pageants, although it – or variants of the segment – are frequently held every two to four weeks. A Christmas-themed version, Miss Santita, is held the Saturday before Christmas. Another version, "Miss Colita Petite", features mainly smaller women. From 2003 to 2005, it was succeeded by a similar contest, "Miss Curvilinea", which focused more on the body type and form. The final Miss Colita contest took place on August 22, 2015, the same night as the Miss Teen USA 2015 pageant.

It is also well known for the song "Mueve la colita", where the idea of the contest was conceived from; it has been an unofficial hymn of Sábado Gigante. Don Francisco had stated that the popularity of the song and its accompanying dance saved the program from an early cancellation in 1987, although this was not publicly revealed until 2012, during the show's 50th anniversary celebration.

This segment has been criticized by several former Miss Universe delegates including Alicia Machado, Justine Pasek, Mónica Spear, and Taliana Vargas due to the main focus of the contest being the buttocks. This led to the creation of Miss Curvilinea, among other similar contests.

=== Miss Chiquitita ===
This contest featured girls (usually children) competing for the title of Miss Chiquitita. The contest was held between 1994 and 1996, and was held in a two-month period; it was revived in July 2012 after a 16-year hiatus. The structure was similar to Miss America, sans the swimsuit and evening gown rounds.

=== Clan Infantil/Los Niños de la Conversación ===
This segment involved a group of children (usually regular attendees of the program with rotations every year) participating in a round table discussion with Don Francisco regarding various topics. Additionally, the same children are also sometimes used as a panel for contests with adults as participants.

=== Live entertainment ===
Every hour of the show, recording artists and bands (usually from Latin America) perform songs live in front of the audience. Notable non-Spanish language artists/groups that performed in Sábado Gigante have included Pitbull, SkyBlu (of the group LMFAO), No Mercy, Eden's Crush, i5, Dream, Kiley Dean, Tony Bennett and Psy.

In addition to musical talent, other acts such as magicians, world record holders among others also perform their talents during the show.

=== El Detector De Mentiras ===
Whenever someone is accused of infidelity, Don Francisco puts that person to a lie detector test, conducted by retired police officer (and licensed polygraph) Joe Harper. While this is a serious segment, there is some humor, whenever Harper mispronounces the words in the questions since he is not fluent in Spanish, only to be criticized (and corrected) by Don Francisco.

There have been several instances where infidelity was not involved in this segment, when a woman believed to have had an encounter with extraterrestrial life in Battle Ground, Washington, as well as a man being suspected by his wife of being gay.

=== Póngale Ritmo ===
This segment is a dance competition. The first round has contestants perform a freestyle dance before a panel of judges. Only three are selected for the final rounds of the contest.

=== La Cuatro ===
At some point during the show, Don Francisco is interrupted (and sometimes annoyed) by "La Cuatro" (initially named "La Cuatro Dientes" in Chile; played by Chilean singer and actress Gloria Benavides). She has a semi-romantic interest in Don Francisco, but would frequently pester him, including the use of bad jokes and bothering the audience. If La Cuatro pokes fun at various celebrities, Don Francisco repeatedly warns her to not mess with them.

=== Comedy segments ===
There have been numerous comedic segments throughout the show's run. Some of the starring actors include Frank Falcon, Miguel "El Flaco", Gloria Ordonez, Carlos Justis, Juanito and Zulema Salazar. They were best known for helping launch the career of the Argentine model/vedette/actress Nanci Guerrero, who starred in a majority of these sketches. Most have included the following:

- La familia Fernández: A sketch involving a dysfunctional Mexican family, consisting of the patriarch Julio Fernández (played by Carlos Yustis), his wife Teresita, their daughter Isabel and her boyfriend Maximo (played by Patricio Torres), who developed a close friendship with Julio.
- Julio y Max: A spin-off sketch from La familia Fermández, featuring the namesake characters in various situations.
- La Oficina de Producción: One of Sábado Gigante's most popular sketches, it follows "network executives" – La Cuatro, Mr. James Douglas (the head executive who spoke only English in earlier sketches; Mr. Douglas also had a ladies' man persona), La Señorita Karina (a secretary who also acted as Mr. Douglas’ interpreter in the earlier sketches; played by Margarita Coego), Anabel (another secretary who replaced Karina; played by Nanci Guerrero), Ñañito (played by Armando Roblan), Osvaldo Zapata (a supervisor with a Western style), Ricky (a security guard), and Albertito (a chauffeur; played by Miguel González) – at a production office. Don Francisco precedes the sketch by calling one of the characters, while each sketch would end in bad luck, either by arrest, death, an unwanted situation or with Mr. Douglas "firing" one or all of the characters.
- Hospital Gigante: A similar sketch in a hospital setting. This sketch was known for its suggestive/risqué themes, as La Doctora Cosabella (played by Guerrero) would often strip into her lingerie (whenever someone in the hospital shouts "Mequetrefe"). Rómulo (played by Miguel González), a paramedic, has a romantic interest in Cosabella. La Cuatro has a role as another doctor. González and Guerrero returned in-character in 2006, attempting to take Don Francisco to their hospital. Alfonso Zayas also acted in this segment.
- Hotel Gigante: A sketch set in a hotel. It is similar in format to "Hospital Gigante", albeit with different characters.
- Condominio Gigante: A sketch set in a condominium.
- Nave Espacial: A parody sketch of various science fiction films, mostly Star Trek. It is set in a space station.
- Cuatro Para Las Cuatro Con La Cuatro: Itself a parody of telenovelas, it follows La Cuatro as a maid in an apartment (later a mansion). Regular characters included the residents Doña Concha (played by Adonis Losada), Doña Eufrosina (played by Norma Zuñiga) and her partner Don Benedicto, Marcelo Jose (played by Carlos Farach), as well as an American businessman named Donald (aka "El Gringo" or "Nice to Meet You"; played by Aaron Hill). Additionally, Don Francisco appears in a cameo role as a narrator named "YeYe" (initially named "Chalo Gómez"), who would introduce each chapter (the "YeYe" character was later phased out). It was followed by two "sequels", La Posada and Don Medical Center, the latter a reboot of Hospital Gigante, while Hill later reprised his role as the El Gringo character from 2013 until the show's cancellation in 2015 during La Cuatro's segments with Don Francisco while also appearing as his character on most the show's other sketches
- La cosa está dura: A sketch involving Mexican immigrants adjusting to American life.
- El hospital de la risa: Another sketch in a hospital setting.

==== Adonis Losada's arrest, conviction and prison life ====
In September 2009, comedian Adonis Losada, who played Doña Concha on the show, was arrested and subsequently charged with 30 counts of possession of child pornography after detectives in Boynton Beach, Florida alleged that he uploaded one of the images to a social networking site. Police found 18 images of child pornography on a hard drive in his home. Following the arrest, the Doña Concha character was scrapped from Sábado Gigante. On July 7, 2016, Losada was found guilty and sentenced to 153 years in prison.

=== Animal-related contests ===
There have been contests involving animals, usually pets. One of them, La gracias de mi mascota, features pets performing certain talents. Another variant, Igualito a mí mascota, features pets looking like their owners. Ron Magill, from the Metro Zoo in Miami, is a guest on the show whenever these contests are held. Another game, Los huevos de Ron Magill (named after Magill himself), has audience members attempt to replicate an animal's sound which, if one is performed successfully, then that person can reach their hand in an oversized egg for a chance to win up to $1,500.

==== Don Francisco's relationship with Magill ====
It is noted that Magill had also been frequently criticized by Don Francisco, as well as (in some occasions) made fun of by the audience due to his poor Spanish-speaking ability (despite Magill's first language being Spanish during childhood). However, Magill has stated that he re-learned the language through his tenure on Sábado Gigante. During an interview, Magill (jokingly) stated that if he was fluent in Spanish, he would have not been allowed to participate in the show. Another running gag during these segments had Don Francisco constantly annoy Magill while holding certain animals (mostly those potentially dangerous to humans) by constantly asking questions about the animal held.

These gags would later carry over on Don Francisco's later programs (Don Francisco Te Invita and Siempre Niños, both on Telemundo) after the cancellation of Sábado Gigante, whenever Magill is a guest on them.

=== Romance-themed contests ===
Throughout the show's run, there have been competitions involving romantic themes, often rotated weekly. The contests have included the following:

- Solteras Sin Compromiso: A competition involving single women vying to win a date with one of the single men featured in the segment. This competition was primarily played in the Chilean version during the early years of the program. A similar contest played in the Univision version, Solteros y Solteras features single men and women and uses a battle of the sexes format.
- Todo Por El Amor: A series of competitions involving married and unmarried couples. The competitions are done in rounds, with the couple with the most points at the end of the contests wins a cash prize of US$5,000. A running gag of these contests involves Don Francisco slapping the husband/boyfriend if he was not behaving during his relationship with his significant other.

=== Car games ("Final de Automóvil") ===
Throughout its run, the final segment of the show was always a contest where one of the finalists (chosen from those consisting of winners of that episode's games and competitions as well as select members of the audience) have a chance to win a new car prize (there has been one instance where a car was not a prize for an episode, during the 50th anniversary episode, where the prize was $50,000 in cash). The games were played in a different form for every episode in a manner similar to The Price is Right.

Before each car game is played in the Univision version, a disclaimer said by either Don Francisco, Javier Romero or one of the co-presenters precedes the car games by stating: "Any contestant that wishes to win the car must participate in the car games in-person. Neither Sábado Gigante or Univision ask for money in exchange for prizes, if you receive a call asking for money in exchange for a prize [from someone claiming to be on behalf of Univision or Sábado Gigante], please call the corresponding authorities." while the same disclaimer is shown on-screen at the end of the program. A similar disclaimer is also used for the Chilean version of Gigante hosted by Don Francisco's daughter, Vivi. Contestants must be 18 and older to compete for the car, while there have been instances that a contestant's younger family member (often their children/grandchildren) would participate alongside them. It has been revealed that the winning contestants have to wait 30 days for their cars to be delivered to them and that the actual car varied from the one shown in the program.

Cars given away in the U.S. program have included those from Ford Motor Company (1986–89, 1999–2014, 2015 for the final show), Toyota (1987?-1990?), General Motors (1986–1987) Honda (1990–99), Daewoo (2000), Hyundai (2005–09) and Kia Motors (2014–2015). In Chile, some cars given away include Volkswagen, Lada, Renault-Samsung, Arica-Mini, and Subaru.

=== Product placement ===
Throughout the show's run, product placement has been a vital part of Sabado Gigante. Whenever a certain product is advertised during the show, Don Francisco, along with the audience, would sing that product's jingle. Otherwise, he, one of the co-presenters or Javier Romero will describe the product. Most products would often alternate weekly or monthly. Other brands for services have also been advertised in the program as well.

== Irregular segments ==
=== Coro Millionario ===
A competition where three contestants must answer a riddle with the clues sung to them by an on-stage choir. This game debuted in the Univision program in 1990 and was played semi-regularly until 1995. The game would return for a week in 1999 and as a three-week limited run in 2008, the latter of which was the final playing of the competition.

=== La Cámara Viajera ===
La Cámara Viajera ("The Traveling Camera") is the show's travelogue segment – which only appeared occasionally (regularly until 2004) – where Don Francisco visits a selected country where he mainly talks about the culture and its attractions. The segment has taken him to over 185 countries worldwide, many of them more than once. It was also known for its long-term sponsorship with American Airlines on the Univision program, which precedes the segment by advertising daily flights from Miami (where the program was taped) to the location of that week's segment. Additionally, American Airlines commercials would also traditionally air during the commercial break after the segment.

=== Talent competitions ===
There also have been numerous talent competitions throughout the program's run (which are held every 1–4 years). They have included:

- Gigantes de Mañana/Estrellas del Futuro: A singing competition for children and young adults, who performed at one point in specific music genres (Regional Mexican music and Reggaeton, both in 2005).
- Idolos de la Canción: A competition with participants emulating various singers.
- Reyes del Chacal: A competition consisting of past winners of the "El Chacal de la Trompeta" segment.
- Ritmo Dieta: A Zumba-style weight loss competition similar to Póngale Ritmo.
- Diva Latina/Viva la Diva: A singing competition consisting of young women.

== See also ==
- Armando Navarrete Navarrete
