= Logo Board Game =

Board game

The Logo Board Game
- Product type: Board Game
- Current owner: Drumond Park; Spin Master
- Country: United Kingdom
- Introduced: 2009
- Website: http://www.drumondpark.com/logo/

The LOGO Board Game (colloquially known as LOGO) is for 2 to 6 players (or teams) aged 12 and up. Players travel round the board of purple, yellow, green, and red spaces, based on correctly answered questions, until they reach the winning zone in the center. The questions are based on logos, products and packaging of well-known brands.

There are three types of question card:

- Picture cards
- Pot luck cards
- Common theme cards

The game includes 1 playing board, 6 playing pieces, 400 cards containing 1,600 questions and rules.

The game was launched by Drumond Park in 2009, and was one of the three top selling adult games in the UK for that year, with Drumond Park’s Articulate and Rapidough taking the number 2 and 3 spots.

The game launched internationally in 2010, where it was nominated for the Toy of the Year in the Netherlands, and was awarded the “Grand Prix du Jouet – Jeu D’ambiance” in France.

There are other games following The Logo Board Game format but with a main theme including:

- The Best Of British
- The Best Of TV & Movies
- The Best Of Christmas Game
- The Best Of Christmas Game (Not For Kids)
- The Best Of Food
- His & Hers
- Logo What Am I? (Aimed at a slightly younger audience)

In 2020, Drummond Park released The Logo Board Game Second Edition with all-new and updated questions. It also features a new design, but it has the exact same rules and concept of the first edition.
