= The Magic 7 =

- Directed by: Roger Holzberg
- Written by: Roger Holzberg
- Produced by: Roger Holzberg; John C. Kilkenny
- Starring: John Candy; Michael J. Fox; James Earl Jones; Ice-T; Dirk Benedict; Madeline Kahn
- Music by: Kirk Cameron; Judy Collins; Ice-T; Michael O'Hara
- Release date: December 2026
- Country: United States
- Language: English

The Magic 7 is an upcoming animated television film written and directed by Roger Holzberg. It was slated to air on Earth Day (April 22) in 1997, but was postponed. After later plans for a 2005 release, the film was again suspended. Following a successful Kickstarter campaign, the film was revived and will be released as a web series tentatively scheduled for a December 2026 release.

== Plot ==
The film centers on the adventures of two children and a dragon as they fight the arch-enemies of Earth.

== Cast ==
=== Live-action cast ===
- Cory Danziger as Sean
- Dee Wallace as Sean's mom
- Ted Danson as Sean's dad
- Jennifer Love Hewitt as Erica

=== Voice cast ===
- John Candy as Smokestack Sam
- Lani Minella as Wastra
- Michael J. Fox as Marcel Maggot
- Ice-T as Dr. Scratch
- TBA as Thraxx
- Demi Moore as U-Z-Onesa
- James Earl Jones as 5-Toe

== Production ==
=== Development ===
Jeremy Irons was set to voice Thraxx in the late 1990s, but the director has since stated that the actor did not record any lines.

=== Revival ===
In the fall of 2025, Roger Holzberg and Sedona Cruz launched a Kickstarter campaign to complete animation work on The Magic 7. The campaign's goal of $35,000 was reached and the film will be released as a 7-part web series on YouTube. Upon release, it will be the final released projects of actors John Candy, Madeline Kahn, and James Earl Jones and producer Olivia Newton-John.

== Release ==
The film is set to be released in December 2026.
