= The Million Dollar Drop =

- Genre: Game show
- Based on: The Million Pound Drop by Endemol Shine UK
- Presented by: Eddie McGuire
- Country of origin: Australia
- Original language: English
- No. of seasons: 1
- No. of episodes: 6 (12 Unaired)

Production
- Running time: 60 minutes (including adverts)

Original release
- Network: Nine Network
- Release: 21 March – 28 April 2011

Related
- Million Dollar Money Drop (US version)

The Million Dollar Drop is a game show which airs on Nine Network in Australia and is based on the UK series The Million Pound Drop Live. However, unlike the original UK version, it is not broadcast live, and there are several changes to the format. The show premiered on 21 March 2011 and is hosted by Eddie McGuire.

== Game format ==
A team of two people with a pre-existing relationship is presented with A$1,000,000 in $20 notes, banded in bundles of $20,000 (50 bundles = $1,000,000). The team must risk the entire amount on each of eight multiple-choice questions.

For each question, the contestants choose one of two categories, then indicate which answer(s) they wish to risk their money on by moving the bundles of cash onto a row of trap doors, termed "drops," each of which corresponds to one answer. However, they must always keep at least one drop "clear" with no money on it. In addition, seven of the eight questions have a time limit; any money that is not placed on an answer when time runs out will be lost.

Once the money is in place, the trap doors for the incorrect answers are opened, and the cash on them falls out of sight and is lost. The contestants then continue the game using the cash they had placed on the correct answer. They get to keep whatever money is left after the eighth question; if they lose everything before reaching this point, the game ends immediately and they leave with nothing.

== See also ==
- The Million Pound Drop Live
- Million Dollar Money Drop
