= Don Francisco Presenta =

- Genre: Talk show, variety, reality
- Created by: Don Francisco
- Presented by: Don Francisco
- Country of origin: United States
- Original language: Spanish

Original release
- Network: Univision
- Release: October 10, 2001 – January 30, 2012

Related
- Don Francisco te invita

Don Francisco Presenta is a Spanish-language talk/reality show produced by Univision, and was hosted by Don Francisco. From October 11, 2001, to November 3, 2010, Univision originally aired Don Francisco Presenta on Wednesday nights at 10pm/9c. From November 10, 2010, to January 30, 2012, Univision aired the talk show Monday nights at 10pm/9c, after Cristina ended its run. The series also aired five specials between 2002 and 2008.

On February 6, La que no podía amar replaced all programs shown weeknights at 10pm/9c, due to low ratings and little viewership by Telemundo's novela: Relaciones Peligrosas (also shown at 10pm/9c). On March 29, Don Francisco Presenta was officially canceled by Univision, and as of 2013, telenovelas (such as Amor Bravío and Qué bonito amor) are broadcast at 10pm/9c.
