= Midnight Crossing =

- Theatrical release poster
- Directed by: Roger Holzberg
- Screenplay by: Roger Holzberg; Doug Weiser
- Story by: Roger Holzberg
- Produced by: Mathew Hayden
- Starring: Faye Dunaway; Daniel J. Travanti; Kim Cattrall; John Laughlin; Ned Beatty
- Cinematography: Henry Vargas
- Edited by: Earl Watson
- Production companies: Team Effort; Limelite Studios
- Distributed by: Vestron Pictures
- Release date: May 13, 1988
- Running time: 114 minutes
- Country: United States
- Language: English
- Budget: $5 million
- Box office: $1.3 million

Midnight Crossing is a 1988 American mystery thriller film directed by Roger Holzberg. The film stars Faye Dunaway, Daniel J. Travanti, Kim Cattrall, John Laughlin, and Ned Beatty.

== Plot ==
What begins as a pleasure cruise turns out to be a treasure hunt for two couples, sight-impaired Helen Barton and her husband, Morely, who is a former naval officer, and Jeff and Alexa Schubb.

A million dollars supposedly is buried on a small isle between Florida and Cuba, so the four of them decide to go after it. Their lives become in danger from natives and pirates, as well as from the greed that overwhelms their group.

== Cast ==
- Faye Dunaway as Helen Barton
- Daniel J. Travanti as Morely Barton
- Kim Cattrall as Alexa Schubb
- John Laughlin as Jeff Schubb
- Ned Beatty as Ellis
- Pedro De Pool as Captain Mendoza

== Reception ==
The film received mixed reviews. Of the film the Los Angeles Times noted, "There's something about its willingness to shove the subject past reasonable bounds—right into the blackest depths of character degeneration and emotional hysteria—that almost commands respect."

== Box office ==
Midnight Crossing was not a success. The producers owed money to cinema companies because of the film's commercial failure.
