= Drumond Park =

British game manufacturer

- Type: Privately held company
- Industry: Games
- Founded: 1988
- Headquarters: United Kingdom
- Website: www.drumondpark.com

Drumond Park is an independent British game manufacturer.

== History ==
The company was founded in 1988.

Beginning in 2015, the company began distributing the games made by them through Vivid Imaginations, before switching to Tomy UK. On 6 November 2023, it was announced that Tomy UK had purchased Drumond Park's games portfolio.

=== John Adams Leisure ===
The company formerly owned fellow toy company John Adams Leisure and its subsidiary Toy Brookers. Originally, Drumond Park promoted their own products with theirs until the company split away as a separate division in 2007. In June 2014, John Adams Leisure underwent a management buyout.

== Notable brands ==
=== Current ===
- Absolute Balderdash
- All Star Family Fortunes
- Articulate
  - Articulate Your Life!
  - Articulate For Kids
- Bang On!
- Barbecue Party
- Catch Phrase
- Crazy Claw
- Dig In!
- Don't Laugh!
- Gassy the Cow
- Horrid Practical Jokes
- King Pong
- The Logo Board Game
  - Logo Lite
  - The Best of British
  - His & Hers
  - The Best of TV and Movies
  - Logo What Am I?
- The Magic Tooth Fairy Game
- Og on the Bog
- Pandemonio
- Pickin' Chickens
- Rapidough
- Shark Bite
- Snotcha!
- Stoopido
- SSHH! Don't Wake Dad!
- Who's the Dude?
- Wordsearch!
  - Wordsearch! Junior

=== Former ===
- Animatazz
- Bubble Buster
  - Bubble Buster Kazoo
- Doh Nutters (Transferred over to John Adams Leisure in 2016)
- Pig Goes Pop (Transferred over to John Adams Leisure in 2016)
- Countdown
- Deal or No Deal
  - Board Game
  - Card Game
  - Electronic Game
- Eggheads
- Million Pound Drop
- Gross Magic (Transferred over to John Adams Leisure in 2018)
- The Box of Shocks (Transferred over to John Adams Leisure in 2018)
- Oginov Tumbler
- Pumpalloons
- Rubik's (Transferred to John Adams Leisure in 2011)
  - Rubik's Cube
  - Rubik's Revenge
  - Rubik's Homer Head
  - Rubik's Cube Keychain
  - Rubik's 360
