= Steven Spielberg's Director's Chair =

1996 video game

- Developer: Knowledge Adventure
- Publisher: Knowledge Adventure
- Director: Steven Spielberg (live action)
- Producers: Roger Holzberg (game); Bruce Cohen (live action)
- Designers: Roger Holzberg; Rick Carter
- Programmer: Roanna Doty
- Artists: David Lowery; Lee Doran Crim
- Writers: Martin Casella; Ted Elliott; Terry Rossio
- Platforms: Windows, Macintosh
- Release: NA: 1996
- Genre: Simulation
- Mode: Single-player

Steven Spielberg's Director's Chair is a 1996 simulation video game by Knowledge Adventure for Windows and Macintosh. In the game, the player is guided by film director Steven Spielberg through the process of moviemaking, including scriptwriting, filming, and editing, using pre-generated film clips featuring Jennifer Aniston, Quentin Tarantino, Katherine Helmond, and Penn & Teller, among others. The game features advice from Hollywood professionals such as editor Michael Kahn, special effects supervisor Michael Lantieri, and cinematographer Dean Cundey. The game was produced by Roger Holzberg, who directed bluescreen scenes in which Spielberg, Kahn, Lantieri and Cundey themselves appeared. Spielberg served as executive producer and live-action director.

== Plot ==
The player begins with a small budget and a personal assistant who provides guidance. Spielberg gives a pep talk to the player before the first feature can be made. Ted and Terry (or Terry and Ted) offer the player useful suggestions on changing the film's script. Delays can occur during the filmmaking process. Ultimately, the player works with actor Quentin Tarantino and actress Jennifer Aniston, as well as Penn & Teller. Cinematographer Dean Cundey also works on the player's film to keep it within budget.

The film is then edited by the player, who can choose which angles to use, and can add sound effects and a soundtrack. Spielberg then presents the film at its premiere. The studio sometimes offers the player a chance to make the film again with a larger budget. Script and shot options increase as the player advances in experience.

The short film within the game concerns a prisoner on death row (Tarantino) sentenced to death for the killing of an old lady (Katherine Helmond). His partner (Aniston) sets out to clear his name by investigating a pair of sinister magicians (Penn & Teller). The virtual budget of the game is $40 million.

== Reception ==
Reception

Review scores
Publication	Score
AllGame	3/5
Computer Gaming World	2.5/5

Computer Gaming World rated the game two and a half stars out of five. AllGame rated the game three stars out of five.

In 2020, Molleindustria released a free browser version of the short film within the game, presented as a simplified interactive movie similar to Black Mirror: Bandersnatch, or Mosaic.
