= Javier Romero =

Cuban-American radio and television host

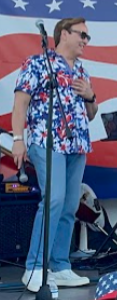
- Romero in 2022
- Born: November 1, 1964 (age 61); Santa Clara, Cuba
- Occupations: Radio and television host
- Television: Sábado Gigante

Javier Romero (born November 1, 1964) is a Cuban-American radio and television host. He works for Amor 107.5, where he hosts El Desayuno, and for Univision 23, where he hosts Contigo. He was previously the co-host of Sábado Gigante. In 2021, he became the first Cuban American to be inducted in the Radio Hall of Fame.

== Early life ==
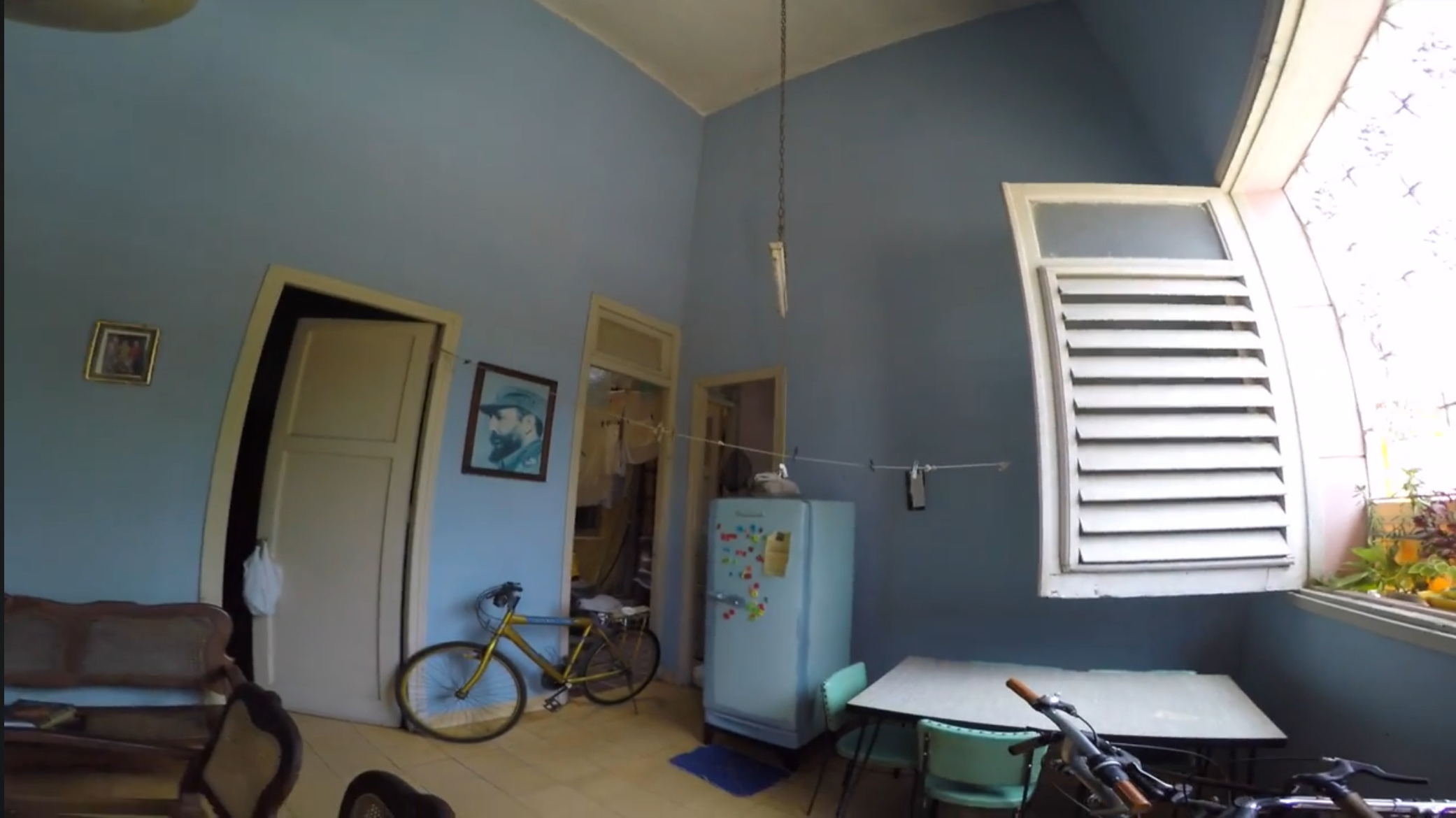
Birth house of Javier Romero, in Santa Clara, Cuba, seen in 2016

Javier Romero was born on November 1, 1964, in Santa Clara, Cuba. In 1969, he and his family went to live to Spain. Four years later, they settled in Connecticut and then moved to Miami, Florida.

== Career ==
In 1991, Romero began to co-host Univision Saturday show Sábado Gigante, which was mainly hosted by Don Francisco. He stayed until the program ended in 2015.

== Awards ==
- 2021 Radio Hall of Fame Inductee
