= Clinton and Nadine =

1988 American TV movie

- UK cover under the title Blood Money
- Genre: Action; Crime; Thriller
- Written by: Robert Foster (as Willard Walpole)
- Directed by: Jerry Schatzberg
- Starring: Andy Garcia; Ellen Barkin; Morgan Freeman
- Composer: Jan Hammer
- Country of origin: United States
- Original language: English

Production
- Producers: Donald March; Brad R. Loman
- Cinematography: Isidore Mankofsky
- Editor: David Ray
- Running time: 110 minutes
- Production companies: Incorporated Television Company; HBO Pictures

Original release
- Network: HBO
- Release: May 28, 1988

Clinton and Nadine (also known as Blood Money) is an American TV movie broadcast on HBO on May 28, 1988.

== Plot ==
Clinton (Andy Garcia) enlists the aid of Nadine (Ellen Barkin), an expensive call girl, to find his brother's murderer. Clinton and Nadine get sucked into a plot to smuggle guns to the Contra forces in Nicaragua.

== Cast ==
- Andy Garcia as Clinton Dillard
- Ellen Barkin as Nadine Powers
- Morgan Freeman as Dorsey Pratt
- John C. McGinley as Turner
- Michael Lombard as James Conrad
- Brad Sullivan as General John Anson
- Alan North as Detective Rayburn
- Bill Raymond as Jewell
- Mario Ernesto Sánchez as Rojas
- Nancy Giles as Alice
- Helen Davies as Ione
- Julio Oscar Mechoso as Huesito
- Anthony Correa as Luis
- Jay Amor as Bernando
- Helen Hanft as Lady Manager
- Carlos Cestero as Chamorro
- Pedro De Pool as Adolfo

== Reception ==
In a positive review of the film, reviewer John O'Connor of The New York Times wrote that the film "represents still another impressive step forward in cable's ability to merchandise the small, well-made movie, constructed around a sturdy script and first-rate performances." The review concludes, "Mr. Garcia and Ms. Barkin give us two of the season's more seductive outsiders."

In a negative review of the film, Terry Atkinson of Los Angeles Times wrote, "Instead of delicious tension, enjoyable surprises and a memorable love affair, we get a cheap melodrama full of gunfire, car chases, cardboard villains, pseudo-topical plot devices (the villains are pro-Contra gun runners), some ugly killings and contemplated killings, a phony-baloney escape right out of a bad episode of 'Mission Impossible,' and a slap-dash, inconclusive ending." The review concludes, "Freeman is one of the poorly drawn political bad guys--but never mind them: The real culprit here is the script by Robert Foster, which aggravatingly fails to develop characters, motivations, situations or dialogue."
