= The Million Pound Drop =

British television quiz show

- Also known as: The Million Pound Drop Live (2010–2012); The £100K Drop (2018–2019)
- Genre: Game show
- Presented by: Davina McCall; Phil Spencer (2012 special); Alan Carr (2013 special)
- Theme music composer: Marc Sylvan
- Country of origin: United Kingdom
- Original language: English
- No. of series: 15 (Regular); 2 (Christmas); 1 (Celebrity)
- No. of episodes: 177 (Regular); 9 (Christmas); 8 (Celebrity)

Production
- Production locations: 3 Mills Studios (2010–15); Dock10 (2018–19)
- Running time: 60–120 minutes (inc. adverts)
- Production company: Remarkable Entertainment (Note: Known from 2010–2015 as Remarkable Television)

Original release
- Network: Channel 4
- Release: 24 May 2010 – 20 March 2015
- Release: 7 May 2018 – 23 August 2019

The Million Pound Drop (also The Million Pound Drop Live and briefly The £100K Drop) is a British television quiz show which was broadcast on Channel 4 in the United Kingdom. The show was first aired on 24 May 2010 and was presented by Davina McCall.

The show used social networking sites (such as Facebook and Twitter) to advertise the show as well as to find contestants. David Flynn, managing director of Endemol's Remarkable Television, which produced the show, said: "The plan was to create buzz and an air of mystery around the show by trickling information about auditions via Twitter and Facebook, giving fans a level of exclusivity."

After a three-year hiatus, the series returned in a daily afternoon slot in May 2018 with a reduced prize fund of £100,000 and with a new name, The £100K Drop, and McCall reprising her role. The new format presented three series totalling 120 episodes. The show was cancelled in December 2019.

== Format ==
=== Gameplay ===
Contestants, alone or in pairs for the first series, or only in pairs from the second to the ninth series, are given £1,000,000 in £50 notes at the start of the show, banded in 40 bundles of £25,000 each. Contestants are presented with multiple-choice questions, mostly either general knowledge, or focused on current or recent events (even events that occur during the airing of the show) with the words of "this week", "today" even "right now", to accentuate the fact that the show is broadcast live.

The contestants choose one of two categories at the beginning of each round. If they take too long to choose, a coin is flipped to decide. Each answer option corresponds to a different trapdoor or "drop"; only one answer is correct. The contestants have a set length of time to distribute all the money among the drops as they see fit, but they must leave at least one drop "clear", with no money on it. Any money not placed on a drop when time runs out is forfeited, and contestants who violate any rules, such as placing money on every drop, typically face immediate elimination, except on some international versions of the show. The contestants may stop the timer early if they are satisfied with their choice of answers.

After the timer either runs out or is stopped, the drops for the incorrect answers are opened. Any money placed on them falls down a chute and is removed from play by security guards beneath the stage, while any money placed on the correct answer is carried forward to the next question. This process is repeated until the contestants either run out of money and lose, or answer the final question correctly and keep all remaining money.

The time limit and number of answers per question vary over the course of the game as follows:

| Question(s) | Original (2010–12 and 2014–15) | | 2013 change | | 2018–19 (The £100K Drop) | |
| Question(s) | No. of answers | Time limit (seconds) | No. of answers | Time limit (seconds) | No. of answers | Time limit (seconds) |
|---|---|---|---|---|---|---|
| 1–3 | 4 | 60 | 4 | 60 | 4 | 60 |
| 4 | 4 | 60 | 3 | 60 | 3 | 45 |
| 5–6 | 3 | 60 | 3 | 60 | 3 | 45 |
| 7 | 3 | 60 | 2 | 60 | 2 | 45 |
| 8 | 2 | 60 | 2 | 60 | —N/a | |

==== Other games ====
For the 2010 Christmas specials, any contestants who lost all their money and would otherwise have left empty-handed were presented with multiple doors corresponding to bonus prizes. The contestants would choose which door they wanted and would win what was 'behind' that door. From the 2011 Christmas specials onwards, a new feature was introduced to allow online players to compete against one another. Additionally, a counter was added to the display screen for each drop to indicate how much money had been placed on it, eliminating the need for manual counting.

On 2 January 2012, as part of the Channel 4 Mash-up, Davina McCall played the game with Andrew, her father; the show was hosted by Phil Spencer from Location, Location, Location. A second Channel 4 Mash-up happened in 2013, this time being hosted by Alan Carr.

==== 2013 changes ====
Significant changes to the format were made in summer 2013 for the tenth series. Teams of four, rather than just being strictly pairs, can now play the game. At each question, the player(s) can swap positions with their teammates – two backstage watching, the other two answering the questions onstage. Unlike previous series, there are now just seven questions and no question categories (if a team is playing); with the first three questions having four answers, the next three questions had three answers, and a seventh and a final (eighth) question with only two.

Contestants who answer the seventh question correctly are shown two possible answers for a "Final Drop" question, and may choose to attempt it or leave with their winnings. A miss on the Final Drop forfeits all winnings, while a correct answer doubles the total for a maximum potential prize of £2,000,000.

==== 2014 changes ====
Starting from summer 2014, contestants could play as individuals again after four years. Prior to that, only Gemma in the very first UK series (as well as five contestants in the Chinese version) had played the Drop as individuals in their countries. The show's title was rebranded to The Million Pound Drop. The series was the first to be pre-recorded due to time constraints.

==== 2018 revival: The £100K Drop ====
On 14 July 2017, it was announced that the programme would be returning in the daily afternoon slot of 2018, but with a lower prize fund of £100,000 in £10 notes (40 bundles of £2,500 each), and with the name of the show changing to The £100K Drop. McCall reprised her hosting role, and the series format was similar to the 2013 format with only seven questions, with a reduced 45-second timer for the last four questions. The revival ran for three series, the first with 60 episodes, and the last two with 30 episodes each, both broadcast in 2019.

=== Production ===
Prior to the taping of each episode, all audience members, studio personnel and contestants must pass a security clearance. They must also sign a non-disclosure agreement and turn in possessions such as mobile phones and small bags, to be returned after taping is complete. Security officers are present in the studio to safeguard the bundles used in the game, which contain actual cash obtained from an undisclosed bank within the United Kingdom. (Note: Opening Narration (McCall): "Earlier tonight, £1,000,000 in used banknotes was picked up from a vault in a secret location. An armour-plated vehicle transferred the money to our secured set; guards are present, and monitoring the money at all times. The studio audience have been screened and identified before being admitted; their bags and mobiles have been confiscated. And now someone has a chance to walk away with £1,000,000, absolutely live, in the next hour.") (Note: Opening Narration from later series (McCall): "£1,000,000 in real money was transferred from a secret vault earlier today. The audience has arrived and been screened and searched. The money has been counted and escorted in the studio. £1,000,000 in cash, but will anyone take it home?")

Episodes usually last between 60 and 90 minutes, although the last episode of the series may end slightly sooner or later depending on the contestants' performance. On 23 June 2012, for the first time in the show's history, the episode was extended to 120 minutes. The following week's episode on 30 June 2012 was 100 minutes.

== Interactivity ==
As the show is broadcast live, viewers are encouraged to play along on their smartphones via the iOS and Android apps, or on the Channel 4 website. Aggregated statistics of the audience performance appear on screen during the broadcast and being read out by McCall. Online players receive no prize money but are sometimes given the chance to apply to be on the show. Bookmakers also take bets on which stage of the game the contestants will leave and how much money will still be in play at various stage of the game. Often on the show, if there is a question relating to a particular online source, Davina will announce that the website in question has crashed due to a large number of online players looking up the answers. Later series added the show's application for them to play on their tablets. The interactivity is provided by London second screen company Monterosa.

In 2011, The Million Pound Drop became the first TV show to serve a second screen advert to the online playing audience. It was a 3-minute video featuring rapper Tinie Tempah. The full advert was watched by 20% of the online playing audience according to Dean Donaldson, Global Head of Media Innovation at DG, responsible for the technology.

The last few series of the show were not broadcast live.

== Spin-offs ==
=== The Channel 4 Mash-up ===
On 2 January 2012, a special version of the show aired as part of The Channel 4 Mash-up. The special edition was hosted by Phil Spencer and featured Davina and her father, Andrew, as contestants. This special edition was not broadcast live, as the show usually is, but instead was shown in three pre-recorded 20 minute chunks spread throughout the 'mash-up night' at 6:35pm, 7:55pm and 9:40pm. Davina and her father made it through to the final question with £50,000, but was not won.

The show returned on 4 January 2013 with Alan Carr as host.

=== Stand Up to Cancer ===
On 19 October 2012, a special version aired live as part of Channel 4's UK telethon, Stand Up to Cancer. For this show, the million pounds was doubled (thus making it The Two Million Pound Drop) and a special 16-player celebrity relay team took on the drop for cancer-related charities. A different pair of celebrities handled each question, with the show airing in two segments — questions 1 to 4 at 21:00 and questions 5–8 were later in the evening. Each pair was given just 30 seconds, instead of the usual 60 seconds, for their question.

McCall switched back and forth between the live telethon, hosted alongside Alan Carr and Dr Christian Jessen, and the two Drop segments. The celebrity relay banked £200,000 for Stand Up to Cancer, with the final four pairs wagering the entire amount on a single answer on each question. This special was included in the ninth series of the show (as that series was in progress), unlike the Channel 4 'mash-up' which was a separate edition.

== Other media ==
On 9 July 2021, Estonian live casino game developers Playtech released a licensed live casino game show game called The Money Drop Live on PC and mobile devices. The game is led by a live host and is designed to look and feel like the original Channel 4 show, featuring official branding.

Players are first tasked with betting on the outcome of a 54-segment wheel of fortune, if they guess correctly they will receive a cash prize which they must then risk by spreading it across four trapdoors. If the money falls it is lost, the same as in the television show. If players bet on the right trapdoor then the money is theirs to keep. The higher the value of the overall prize on the line, the more rounds the player must compete in to win it.

== Critical reception ==
=== Ratings ===
The series' highest-rated episode was 4 February 2011, which was seen by 2.79 million viewers and received a 14.4% share. Ratings for series 10 dropped but remained respectable; the first episode (14 June 2013) was seen by 1.57 million viewers and received a 7.6% share.

== Doctor Who Question incident ==
During an episode on 5 November 2010, contestants Johnny and Dee were faced with the options Sylvester McCoy, Paul McGann, Christopher Eccleston and David Tennant. They were then asked "Who played Doctor Who for the longest period?" . The contestants did not know the answer so decided to split their remaining £650,000 between McCoy and McGann. The answer was then revealed to be Tennant—who played the Tenth Doctor from 2005 to 2010—and they lost all their remaining money.

Fans of Doctor Who questioned the accuracy of the question, saying it was open to interpretation as McCoy portrayed the Seventh Doctor from 1987 to 1989, but also appeared at the beginning of the Doctor Who television film in 1996, making his time playing the character technically nine years uninterrupted. After the producers spoke to the BBC, they were informed that McCoy was actually the correct answer.

Channel 4 then announced that Johnny and Dee were allowed to return to the show to continue with the £325,000 that would have remained on an episode aired on 12 November 2010. They went on to win £25,000.

== Merchandise ==
A board game was released by Drumond Park in November 2010.

== Transmissions ==
=== The Million Pound Drop ===
| Series | Start date | End date | Episodes |
|---|---|---|---|
| 1 | 24 May 2010 | 29 May 2010 | 6 |
| 2 | 25 October 2010 | 13 November 2010 | 9 |
| 3 | 28 January 2011 | 19 February 2011 | 8 |
| 4 | 22 April 2011 | 28 May 2011 | 12 |
| 5 | 2 September 2011 | 8 October 2011 | 12 |
| 6 | 13 January 2012 | 11 February 2012 | 10 |
| 7 | 24 March 2012 | 21 April 2012 | 10 |
| 8 | 15 June 2012 | 14 July 2012 | 10 |
| 9 | 14 September 2012 | 20 October 2012 | 12 |
| 10 | 14 June 2013 | 20 July 2013 | 12 |
| 11 | 11 July 2014 | 26 September 2014 | 12 |
| 12 | 20 February 2015 | 20 March 2015 | 4 |

=== Christmas specials ===
| Series | Start date | End date | Episodes |
|---|---|---|---|
| 1 | 15 December 2010 | 18 December 2010 | 4 |
| 2 | 5 December 2011 | 9 December 2011 | 5 |

=== Celebrity Games ===
| Series | Start date | End date | Episodes |
|---|---|---|---|
| 1 | 20 July 2012 | 11 August 2012 | 8 |

=== The £100K Drop ===
| Series | Start date | End date | Episodes |
|---|---|---|---|
| 1 | 7 May 2018 | 27 July 2018 | 60 |
| 2 | 7 January 2019 | 15 February 2019 | 30 |
| 3 | 15 July 2019 | 23 August 2019 | 30 |

=== Notes ===
- On 2 January 2012 and 4 January 2013, two special programmes aired as part of The Channel 4 Mash-up.
- Celebrity Games was the first time a series had been pre-recorded.
- The eleventh series onwards was pre-recorded, while it was also the first pre-recorded regular series.

== International versions ==
International versions of The Money Drop have been exported to over fifty countries. Banijay holds the rights to the format.

Countries with their own version (as of September 2016)

Legend: Currently airing No longer airing Future version Non-broadcast pilot

| Country/language | Local title | Host | Channel | Top prize | Date aired/premiered |
|---|---|---|---|---|---|
| Afghanistan | شما ومیلیون; Shoma wa million | Mukhtar Lashkari | 1TV | ؋1,000,000 | 15 February 2014 – 2015 |
| Albania | 100 Milionë | Eno Popi; Adi Krasta | Top Channel | L10,000,000 | 11 January 2011 – 2018 |
| Argentina | Salven el millón | Susana Giménez | Telefe | AR$1,000,000 | 9 June – 22 December 2011 |
| Argentina | Salven los millones | Susana Giménez | Telefe | AR$2,000,000 | 23 May 2013 |
| Australia | The Million Dollar Drop | Eddie McGuire | Nine Network | A$1,000,000 | 21 March – 28 April 2011 |
| Azerbaijan | Düşən pullar | Şəhriyar Əbilov | AzTV | ₼100,000 | 6 November 2023 – present |
| Belarus | Шоу Сто Миллионов; Shou Sto Millionov | Georgy Koldun | ONT | Br 100,000,000 | 13 September 2014 – 23 May 2015 |
| Belgium (in Dutch) | De val van een miljoen | Evy Gruyaert | VIER | €1,000,000 | 31 August – 23 November 2013 |
| Brazil | Um Milhão na Mesa | Silvio Santos | SBT | R$1,000,000 | 21 September – 14 December 2011 |
| Brazil | Salvou, é Seu | Luciano Huck | TV Globo | R$1,000,000 | 14 April 2024 – present |
| Bulgaria | Да ти паднат 100 хиляди Da ti padnat 100 hilyadi | Niki Kanchev | Nova | лв. 100,000 | 2012 |
| Cambodia | 200 Million Money Drop | Chea Vibol | Hang Meas HDTV | ៛200,000,000 | 12 April 2014 – July 2017 |
| Chile | Atrapa los Millones | Don Francisco | Canal 13 | CL$400,000,000 | 25 March 2012 – 1 May 2015 |
| Chile | Atrapa los Millones - La apuesta de tus sueños | Diana Bolocco | Canal 13 | CL$100,000,000 | 9 March 2015 |
| China | 最强喜事 (National version); Zuiqiang Xishi | Mǎ Kě | Guizhou TV | 30 free trips (50 trips in early episodes) | 24 July – 25 December 2011 |
| China | 让梦想飞 (Season 6, regional version) | Yang Bo | Shandong TV Life Channel | CN¥ 50,000 (Weekday live edition); CN¥ 100,000 (Weekend edition) | 16 June 2014 – 13 February 2015 (Weekday live edition); 10 January 2015 (Weekend edition) |
| Colombia | Millones por montones | María José Barraza | Caracol Televisión | COL$1,000,000,000 | 25 July – 4 September 2011 |
| Denmark | Pengene på bordet | Claus Elming | TV2 | kr. 2,000,000 | 23 March 2013 |
| Egypt | أنت والمليون; Inta wal milyon | Naglaa Badr | Mehwar TV | E£1,000,000 | 24 February 2012 – 23 August 2019 |
| Estonia | Rahaauk | Alari Kivisaar | TV3 | €100,000 | 12 September 2011 |
| Finland | Suuret setelit | Heikki Paasonen | MTV3 | €100,000 | 7 March – 9 May 2014 |
| France | Money Drop | Laurence Boccolini | TF1 | €250,000 + Jackpot (unlimited) | 1 August 2011 – 24 February 2017 |
| France | Money Drop | Olivier Minne | M6 | TBA | TBA |
| Germany | Rette die Million! | Jörg Pilawa | ZDF | €1,000,000 | 13 October 2010 – 22 August 2013 |
| Germany | Keep your Money | Wayne Carpendale | Sat.1 | €250,000 | 21 October 2015 |
| Georgia | ფულთან თამაში! Phultan tamashi! | Duta Skhirtladze | Imedi TV | ₾100,000 | 10 April 2013 |
| Greece | Money Drop | Grigoris Arnaoutoglou | Mega Channel | €300,000 | 16 October 2010 – 28 February 2012 |
| Greece | Money Drop | Vicky Stavropoulou | Star Channel | €300,000 | 29 October 2017 – 1 July 2018 |
| Greece | Money Drop | Fanis Mouratidis | Alpha TV | €200,000 | 21 October 2024 – 9 February 2026 |
| Hungary | A 40 milliós játszma | Ferenc Rákóczi | TV2 | 40,000,000 Ft | 29 November 2010 – 22 March 2013 |
| Hungary | Az 50 milliós játszma | Claudia Liptai (2015); Péter Majoros Majka (2017) | TV2 | 50,000,000 Ft | 12 October 2015 – 23 December 2017 |
| Hungary | A 100 milliós játszma | Attila Till; András Stohl | TV2 | 100,000,000 Ft | 17 April – 21 May 2025 |
| Iceland | Vertu viss | Þórhallur Gunnarsson | RÚV | 10,000,000 kr | November 2013 |
| India (in Bengali) | কোটি টাকার বাজি Koti Takar Baji | Jeet | Star Jalsha | ₹10,000,000 | 15 October 2011 – 14 January 2012 |
| India (in Kannada) | ಕಯ್ಯಲ್ಲಿ ಕೋತಿ - ಹೆಲ್ಬಿತ್ತು ಹೋದೀರಿ Kayyalli Koti - Haelbittu Hodeeri | Sai Kumar | Udaya TV | ₹10,000,000 | 17 March 2012 |
| India (in Malayalam) | കൈയ്യില്‍ ഒരു കോടി Kayil Oru Kodi - Are You Ready? | Mamta Mohandas | Surya TV | ₹10,000,000 | 26 March 2012 |
| India (in Tamil) | கையில் ஒரு கோடி - ஆர் யு ரெடி Kaiyil Oru Kodi - Are You Ready? | Rishi | Sun TV | ₹10,000,000 | 10 March 2012 |
| India (in Telugu) | కో అంటే కోటి - మే సొంతం చేస్కొండి Ko Aante Koti - Me Sontham Cheskondi | Jagapathi Babu; Jhansi Laxmi | Gemini TV | ₹10,000,000 | 26 March 2012 |
| Iran | هفت خان; Haft Khan | Mohammad Reza Golzar | Namava | ﷼1,000,000,000 | 28 March – 26 December 2021 |
| Israel | אל תפיל את המיליון; Al Tapil Et HaMillion | Erez Tal | Channel 2 (Keshet) | ₪1,000,000 | 13 October 2010 – 2011 |
| Israel | אל תפילו את המיליון; Al Tapilu Et HaMillion | Avri Gilad | Reshet 13 | ₪1,000,000 | 9 July 2021 – present |
| Italy | The Money Drop | Gerry Scotti | Canale 5 | €1,000,000 | 12 December 2011 – 1 June 2013 |
| Japan | 2000万円クイズ! マネードロップ ¥20,000,000 Quiz! Money Drop | Yūsuke Santamaria | TBS | ¥20,000,000 | 31 October 2012 – 10 January 2013 |
| Kazakhstan | Қырық Миллион Теңге Шоуы (Шоу Сорок Миллионов Тенге); Qırıq Mïllïon Teñge Şowı (Shou Sorok Millionov Tenge) | Abdel' Mukhtarov | tv7 | ₸40,000,000 | 22 January 2011 – 28 December 2013 |
| Latvia | Paņem 100 000... ja vari | Edgars Ludāns | TV3 | €100,000 | 1 October 2011 – 2012 |
| Lithuania | 100 000 eurų grynais | Marijonas Mikutavičius | TV3 | €100,000 | 2 September 2011 – 2012 |
| Malaysia (in Malay) | RM 1,000,000 Money Drop | AC Mizal | Astro Ria | RM1,000,000 | 3 December 2011 – 4 March 2012 |
| Mongolia | 50 саяын уналт 80 sayiin unalt | D.Enkhbayar | Edutainment TV HD | ₮50,000,000 | January 2013 |
| Mongolia | 80 саяын уналт 80 sayiin unalt | D.Enkhbayar | Edutainment TV HD | ₮80,000,000 | 27 April 2016 |
| Myanmar | The Money Drop Myanmar ငွေတွေဝင် | Kaung Htet Zaw | Channel 7 | K 25,000,000 | 1 May 2017 – present |
| Netherlands | Show Me The Money | Beau van Erven Dorens | SBS 6 | €1,000,000 | 11 April 2011 – 1 December 2012 |
| Niger | N1,000,000 Money drop | Farub Arlane | DL 4 | CFA 1,000,000 | 5 September 2015 |
| Nigeria (in English) | The Money Drop | Gideon Okeke | Africa Magic; Omnitrix TV | US$100,000 | 13 January 2013 – present |
| Norway | Pengene på bordet | Sturla Berg-Johansen | TV2 | kr 2,000,000 | 2012 |
| Peru | Atrapa el Millón | Mónica Zevallos | ATV | S/.1,000,000 | 14 September 2014 |
| Philippines | The Million Peso Money Drop | Vic Sotto | TV5 | ₱1,000,000 | 14 October 2012 – 17 February 2013 |
| Poland | Postaw na milion | Łukasz Nowicki | TVP2 (2011–2019; 2021–present); TVP1 (2019–2020) | 1,000,000zł | 5 March 2011 – present |
| Portugal | The Money Drop - Entre a ganhar | Teresa Guilherme | TVI | €100,000 | 30 March 2015 – 7 April 2016 |
| Romania | Cu banii jos | Dan Negru | Antena 1 | €100,000 | 19 September 2012 |
| Russia | Шоу Десять Миллионов; Shou Desyat' Millionov | Maxim Galkin | Russia 1 | 10,000,000 ₽ | 4 September 2010 – 14 June 2014 |
| Serbia | Multimilioner | Dragan Nikolić | RTV Pink | din. 10,000,000 | 13 September 2011 |
| Singapore (in English) | Million Dollar Money Drop | George Young | MediaCorp TV Channel 5 | S$1,000,000 | 9 August – 2 November 2011 |
| Slovenia | Denar pada | Jonas Žnidaršič | Planet TV | €100,000 | 3 April 2013 |
| Slovenia | Denar pada | David Urankar and Lara Medved | Planet TV | €100,000 | 31 March 2025 – present |
| South Africa (in English) | Million Rand Money Drop | Busi Lurayi | M-Net; Omnitrix TV | R 1,000,000 | 10 April 2013 (1st Season ended) |
| Spain | Atrapa un Millón | Carlos Sobera; Arturo Valls (Guest) | Antena 3 | €1,000,000 (weekly) | 4 February 2011 – 18 April 2012 |
| Spain | Atrapa un Millón | Manel Fuentes; Juanra Bonet | Antena 3 | €1,000,000 | 11 January 2023 – present |
| Spain | Atrapa un Millón Diario | Carlos Sobera | Antena 3 | €200,000 (daily) | 4 April 2011 – 8 September 2014 |
| Spain | Atrapa dos Millones | Carlos Sobera | Antena 3 | €2,000,000 (special) | 21 October 2011 |
| Sri Lanka (in Sinhala) | Five Million Money Drop | Ashan Dias | Sirasa TV | රු.5,000,000 | 13 August 2022 – present |
| Sweden | Pengarna på bordet | Peter Jihde | TV4 | kr 2,000,000 | 3 October 2011 – 2012 |
| Sweden | Miljonlotteriets pengarna på bordet | Paolo Roberto | TV4 | kr 2,000,000 | 1 October – 12 December 2013 |
| Switzerland (in German) | Die Millionen-Falle | René Rindlisbacher | SF1 | CHF 1,000,000 | 4 July 2011 – 22 June 2015 |
| Thailand | The Money Drop Thailand | Varavuth Jentanakul | Channel 7HD | ฿2,000,000 (2 August 2014 – 2 August 2015; 12 March 2017 – 25 February 2018) ฿2,000,000 + Car (8 August 2015 – 11 March 2017) | 2 August 2014 – 25 February 2018 |
| Thailand | The Money Drop Thailand เกมแจกเงิน | Varavuth Jentanakul and Anuwat Fuangthongdang | Channel 7HD | ฿1,000,000 | 4 August 2019 – 30 June 2021 |
| Thailand | Million Baht Money Drop | | | ฿1,000,000 | |
| Turkey | Bir Milyon Canlı Para | Engin Altan Düzyatan | Show TV | ₺1,000,000 | 25 October 2010 – 2011 |
| Turkey | Bir Milyon Canlı Para | Murat Başoğlu | Fox | ₺1,000,000 | 9 September 2012 – 2013 |
| Turkey | Bir Milyon Canlı Para | Mesut Yar | Kanal D | ₺1,000,000 | 31 March 2014 – 2015 |
| Ukraine | Шоу На Два Мільйони (Шоу На Два Миллиона); Shou Na Dva Milyony (Shou Na Dva Milliona) | Andrey Domansky | 1+1 | ₴2,000,000 | 12 January – 30 March 2011 |
| United States | Million Dollar Money Drop | Kevin Pollak | Fox | US$1,000,000 | 20 December 2010 – 1 February 2011 |
| Uruguay | Salven el Millón | Jorge Piñeyrúa | Channel 10 | $U 1,000,000 | 21 August 2012 |
| Vietnam | Đừng để tiền rơi | Hoàng Trung Nghĩa | VTV3 | ₫200,000,000+₫9,000,000 | 16 January 2014 – 30 April 2015 |
| Vietnam | Đừng để tiền rơi | Thành Trung | VTV3 | ₫200,000,000 | 6 January 2016 – 13 September 2017 |

Notes:

1. While most international versions of The Money Drop adopted the original British version format, some versions (such as the American version) adopt an entirely new format, featuring a new set and a title theme, and is played with 50 bundles instead of 40. The new format is still acquired by Endemol, now Banijay.
2. The two Chinese versions are produced without Endemol's permission. The first Chinese version featured iPads each displaying a travel destination of a country instead of cash bundles, and teams can win up to 50 travel destinations for a perfect game.
3. According to Endemol, the format has recently sold to Niger, but all the exact information is unknown yet.
4. Arturo Valls hosted an episode as a cross-over between Atrapa un millón and his own game show Ahora caigo, which was hosted by Carlos Sobera on that afternoon.
5. Though the Thai version's top prize is in Thai baht, the cash on the stage is instead presented as United States dollars, equivalent to top prize money. From August 8, 2015 to March 11, 2017, the Thai version offered a Toyota Vios car key (which is worth ฿830,000) as an additional prize. If the team win the game with the key box intact, they will also win the car.
6. Russian, Ukrainian and Kazakhstan versions are filmed in Moscow (Gorky Film Studio) under the production by Weit Media. Although they are using Russian language (including Belarusian version) as their conversation language, however, the Ukrainian and Kazakhstan (only first season by the host) versions used native language for the introduction, greeting and closing caption. The Ukrainian and Kazakhstan (first season only) versions also offered the SMS interactive game during the program. Unlike Russian, Belarusian, Kazakh version which are using Russian for the questions, Ukrainian version preferred to use Ukrainian for questions instead (though the Kazakh version also provides the question in Kazakh for reference).
7. A Taiwanese game show, Witty Star (歡樂智多星) featured a game segment similar to The Money Drop, where teams answered five questions for up to NT$300,000 (about £8,135 stg), banded in 30 bundles of NT$10,000 each. This is not included in the franchise because the game was actually played as a segment, rather than a full show.
8. In the Vietnamese version during the 2014 Christmas special, there was a special rule in which there are three Christmas gifts, two contestants must choose one of three gifts by putting their gift that they decided to choose on the correct answer door.
9. Also in the Vietnamese version, there was a rule that two contestants can use the 30 seconds bonus to change the money amounts for each answer. This 30 seconds bonus time must be use in only a question (except the final question). This was originally used in Million Dollar Money Drop as the "Quick Change".
