= Nanci Guerrero =

Argentine actress, presenter, comedian, and singer

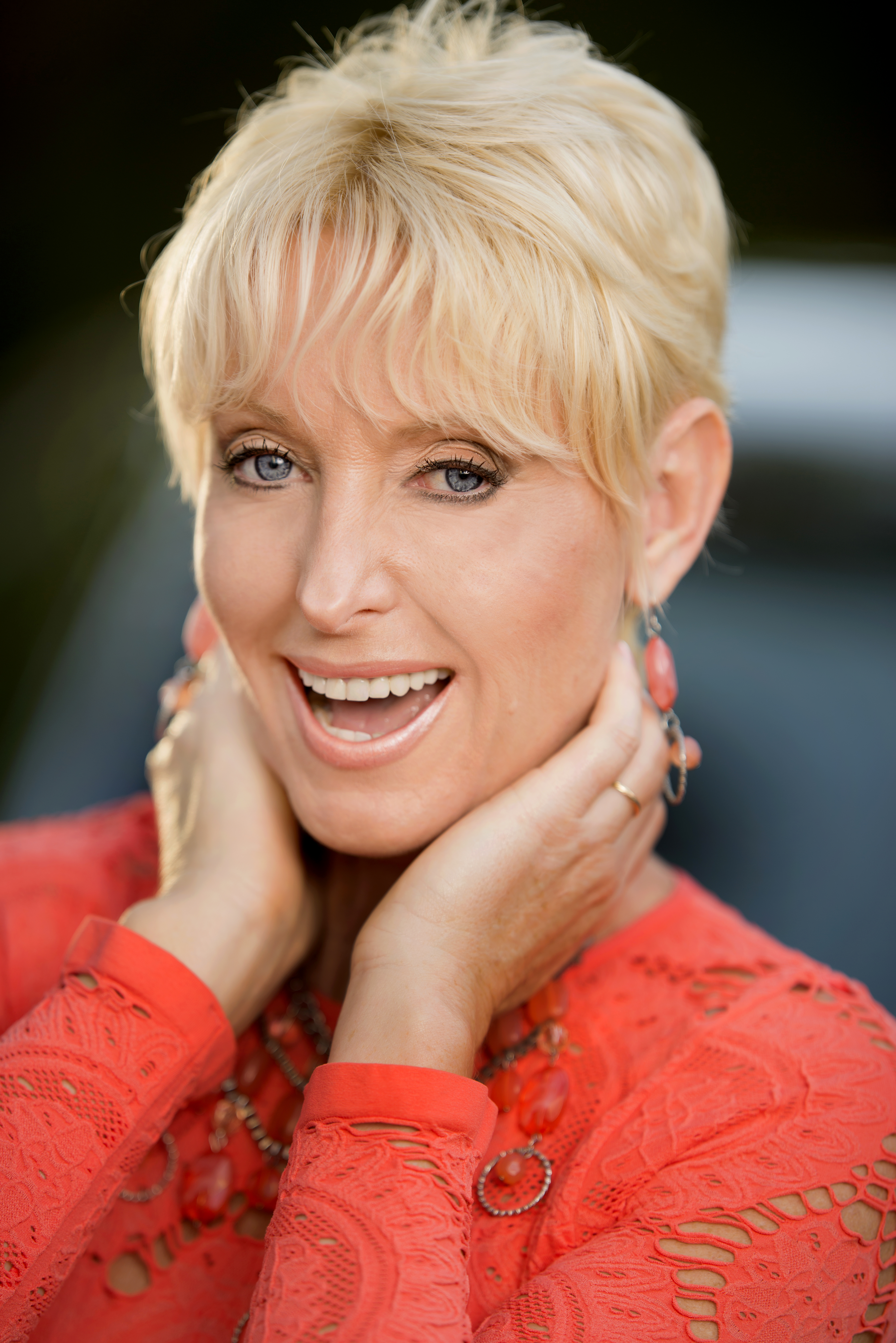
- Born: 26 September 1965 (age 60); San Jerónimo Norte, Santa Fe, Argentina
- Years active: 1992-present
- Known for: Sabado Gigante

Nanci Guerrero (born 26 September 1965) is an Argentine actress, presenter, comedian, and singer.

== Early life ==
Guerrero was born on 26 September 1965, to Hugo Juan Zurschmitten and Ofelia Biderbost, in San Jerónimo Norte, Santa Fe, Argentina, and grew up in Rafaela. She participated in and won several beauty contests in her youth. At age 17, she moved with her parents to Buenos Aires to start her professional career.

== Career ==
Guerrero's career started with modeling for commercial and television ads. She began singing with her manager Eduardo Pérez Guerrero, who later became her husband. He established the musical group Las Guerreras which, in light of Guerrero's growing popularity, was renamed Nanci y Las Guerreras. She began starring in television shows and on stage as a comedian under the name Nanci La Guerrera. Starting in 1992, she was also a presenter of both live and recorded programs in and outside of Argentina, including Venga Conmigo, Jappening con Ja, and Noche de estrellas. In 1999, she joined the cast of Sabado Gigante and later earned an award for her performance as Dr. Cosabella.

In 1997 he recorded his first album in the United States with producer Bebu Silvetti. The subsequent tour took her to Puerto Rico, Costa Rica, Venezuela, Colombia and Ecuador. He recorded No te voy a perder, a song composed by Rudy Pérez, for his ballad album "Las Guerreras". His greatest success was the duet Como te extraño with Leo Dan. [3] She, her husband Eduardo Pérez Guerrero, multi-Grammy producer Rudy Pérez, and Rafael Basurto Lara, a member of Trío Los Panchos, later produced an anthology album in tribute to Eydie Gormé. In the city of Miami, since 2016, every October 28 is celebrated as "Nanci Guerrero Day." He was also awarded "The Key to the City of Miami" Guerrero currently hosts the program En Modo Nanci Guerrero, a television special that highlights the beauty of Miami, Florida, USA, which can be seen on the signal Telefe Internacional and Pluto TV. En Modo Nanci Guerrero, a television special highlighting the beauty of Miami, Florida, USA, aired in late 2022. En 2024, conduce el programa Al ritmo de Miami que se emite por la señal de Telefe Internacional.

== Personal life ==
In 1995, Nanci settled in Miami with her husband, lawyer and producer Eduardo Pérez Guerrero.
