= Don't Wake Daddy =

Board game

- Publication: 1992
- Players: 2–4
- Age range: 3+

Don't Wake Daddy (known as SSHH! Don't Wake Dad! in the UK) is a children's board game originally released by Parker Brothers (later Milton Bradley, currently Hasbro and Goliath) in North America, and Tomy in Europe (currently released by Drumond Park in the United Kingdom). It is intended for two to four players.

== Description ==
Players take the role of children sneaking to the refrigerator late at night for a midnight snack, trying not to wake their sleeping father (who lies in the middle of the board on a large bed).

== Rules ==
The youngest player goes first, and play continues counter-clockwise around the board.

Movement is determined by using a spinner; after spinning, each player moves their piece to the first corresponding color. If a player gets the purple star, they move to the space right in front of the leader unless they are already the leader; in which case they must spin again. If the color of a noise space matches the color of an assigned card that a player holds, they are safe; otherwise, the player makes one of several noises (such as rollerblades, a baseball, a noisy clown on TV, a barking dog, a tricycle, a broken vase, a cuckoo clock, a screaming parrot, a falling picture frame, a toy piano, a bowl of fruit being knocked over, a cat whose tail has been stepped on, a falling dish with a slice of cake on it, a loud radio, falling pots and pans, and a crying baby while the 1992 version included a slamming door, a falling coat rack, someone's foot tripping on the dog's food dish, and a wind-up toy soldier). Then the player who made that noise must press the button on the alarm clock next to the father a certain number of times as indicated on the space (ex: four presses for the number 4); if the father stays asleep, the player's piece can stay where it landed until the next turn. After enough pushes, the clock will go off and the father will suddenly jerk upright from his bed (as if just having awakened from a nightmare), at which point the player claims the corresponding color card from a player that has it, then returns to the starting point upon the father sending them back to sleep. The first player to reach the finish line wins the midnight snack.

== Reception ==
Parker Brothers introduced the game at the 1992 American International Toy Fair. It was picked as the sixth best toy of the year (third-best among girls) in the Duracell Kids' Choice National Toy Survey, and was one of the best-selling games of the 1992 Christmas season. Parker Brothers spokeswoman Ronni Heyman described the game as "a real sleeper". The game's success was cited as a contributing factor in Hasbro's 46% increase in net income after the fourth quarter of 1992. Parker Brothers later released a smaller travel version of the game.

== Legacy ==
The game served as the inspiration for a series of 1990s works by German artist Martin Kippenberger. Kippenberger used the symbols for the different "noises" in the game to plan a cycle of wood-carvings and oil paintings. A children's book based on the game, Don't Wake Daddy: Late-Night Snack, was published by Scholastic Corporation in 2001. Comedy streaming service Dropout featured a version called "Don't Wake Standards & Practices" on an episode of Game Changer.
