= Roger Holzberg =

American film director

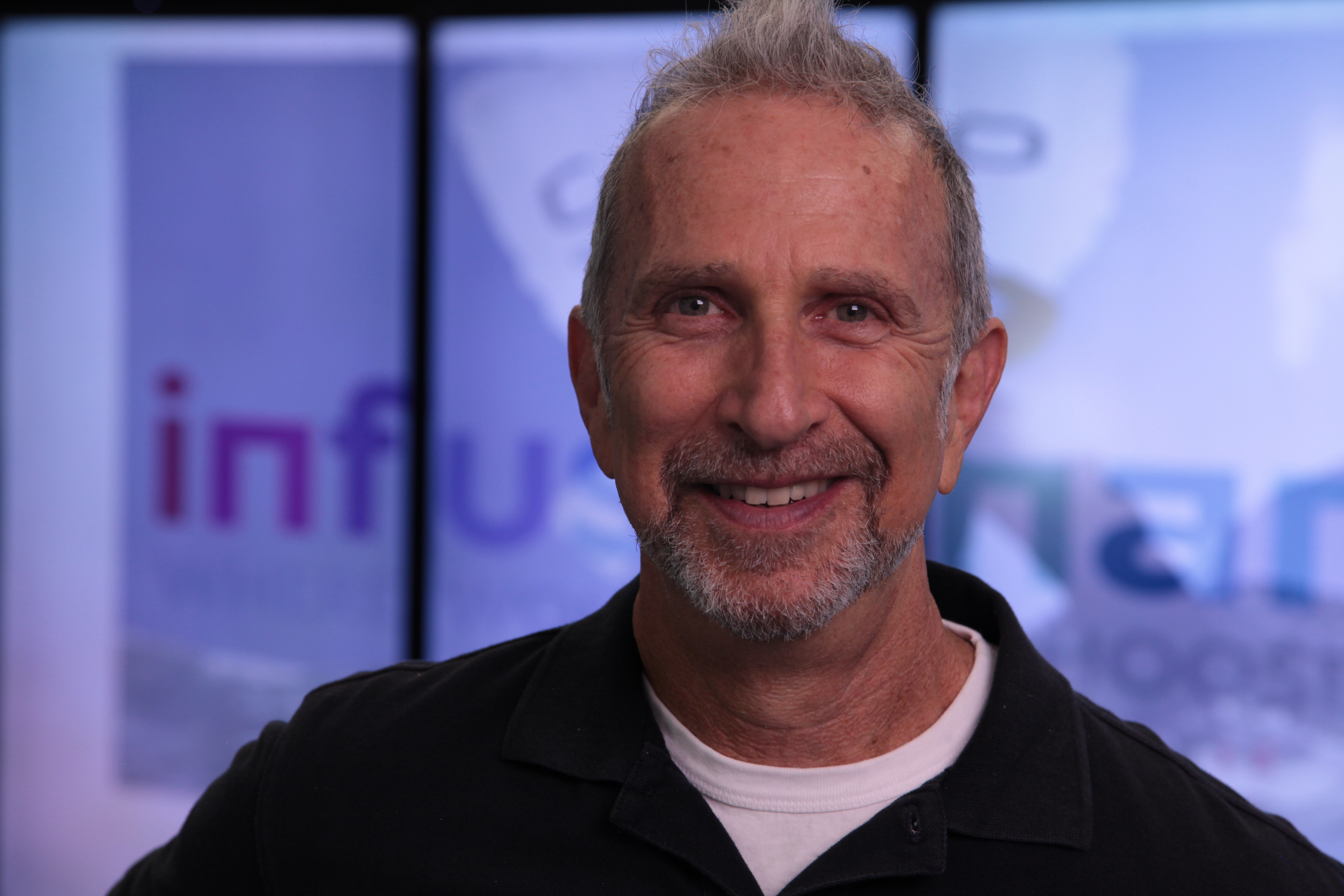
- Roger Holzberg at Infusionarium
- Born: 1954 (age 71–72); Cincinnati, Ohio, U.S.
- Occupations: Health innovator, creative director, teacher, writer, inventor

Roger Holzberg (born 1954) is an American health innovator, creative director, teacher, writer, and inventor. He is the co-founder and creative director for Reimagine Well, and founded the organization My Bridge 4 Life a support network designed to help patients and families navigate the journey from diagnosis to wellbeing. He previously served as the Creative Director (consulting) for the National Cancer Institute. Holzberg was for twelve years a Vice President / Creative Director at The Walt Disney Company, both at Walt Disney Parks and Resorts Online and at Walt Disney Imagineering. He teaches the Healthcare by Design class at the California Institute of the Arts. His personal use of triathlon as a part of his own wellness plan, and as an inspiration for survivorship, was featured by ABC news in Los Angeles in a promotion for the Malibu Triathlon.

== Early life ==
Born in Cincinnati, Ohio, Holzberg attended the University of Colorado in 1974 with a full Title III Talent/Creativity scholarship, majoring in scenic design for theatre and minoring in psychology. He received a BFA from the California Institute of the Arts in 1978.

== Reimagine Well ==
Holzberg is the co-founder and creative director for Reimagine Well. Building on the Disney theme parks' "architecture of reassurance", Reimagine Well seeks to evolve patient treatment and healing by utilizing emerging technologies to create programs and services that better health and wellness outcomes worldwide. Holzberg, himself a cancer survivor who was featured in a Livestrong Foundation survivorship video in 2009, designed the "Infusionarium" for the Children's Hospital of Orange County, a therapeutic visual and auditory program for chemotherapy, dialysis, infusion, palliative care, rehab centers, behavioral health, clinical staff well-being. More recently, Reimagine Well built and launched an entire Infusionarium hospital floor specifically designed for adolescent and young adult patients. More Infusionariums are being built for Baptist Hospital South Florida, Miami Cancer Institute, and St. Joseph's Children's Hospital of Tampa, where the Reimagine Well content platform will also be in more than 250 pediatric rooms. ABC News highlighted the patient and physician experiences in an Infusionarium and referred to these experiences as a “game changer” in pediatric treatment.

Highlights for various Reimagine Well initiatives include:

- MRI Stillness Program - “Dr. Matthew Hall discusses training for stillness”
- The Calm Room - “A program for de-escalation in Behavioral Health”
- CBS EcoMedia - “Infusionarium: A powerful story offering hope for kids with cancer”
- ABC News - “Infusionarium can translate to better treatment outcomes.”

Holzberg has presented innovations at the Society of Adolescent and Young Adult Oncology (SAYAO) conference, Health 2.0, Pediatrics 2040, and Brink 2.0. His panel at Health Interactive, "Athletes 4 Wellbeing: Real Athletes. Real Patients. Real Results", was a panel of athlete patients who are using diet and “active lifestyle” to manage chronic conditions which include cancer, MS, diabetes, heart disease, spinal cord injuries and more. The panel included: Jocelyn Harrison, USAT age category elite triathlete and consultant for the American Diabetes Association & Choose Health LA, Derek Chalmers, cyclist and 10 year MS patient, and Jesse Billauer, Founder of Life Rolls On.

Reimagine Well presentations by Holzberg include:

- Stanford Medicine X - Infusionarium: The Architecture Of Healing / Adapting Disney theme parks “architecture of reassurance” into an architecture of healing.
- California Institute of the Arts - “At the intersection of Imagineering and Medicine"

Interviews with Holzberg include:

- Dr. Amitha Kalaichandran (Thrive Global) on “Leaders in the health and wellness community in North America and globally.”
- HP Case Study "Virtual Reality utilizes immersive healing experiences to promote cancer patient wellbeing"

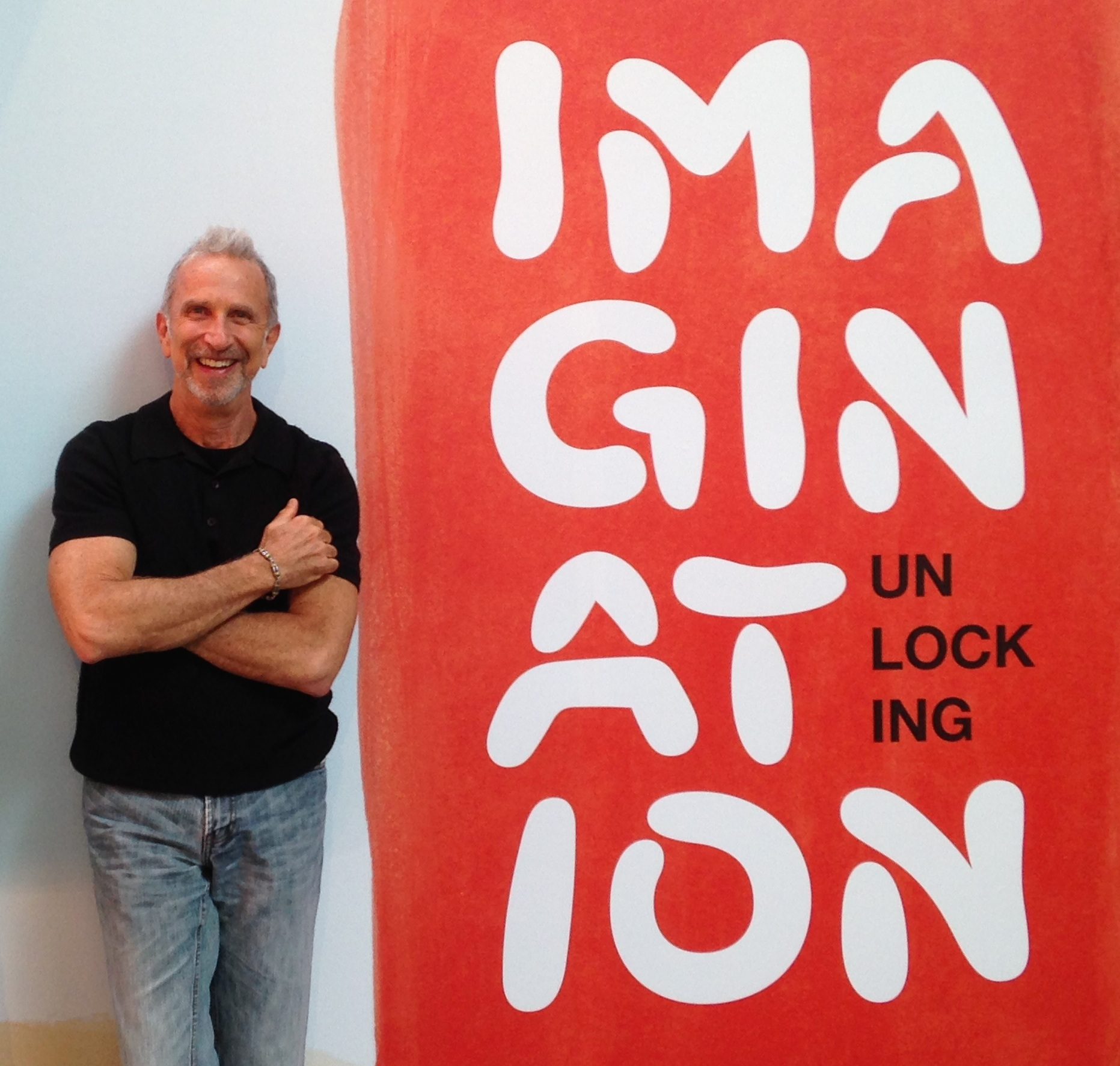

== My Bridge 4 Life ==
Holzberg founded My Bridge 4 Life (MB4L) to provide a wellness network for people facing health crises. MB4L partners with leading healthcare organizations and foundations to enhance patient community awareness, engagement and interaction. My Bridge 4 Life wellness networks enable patients to connect for customized professional healthcare content and expert educational support. MB4L also supports the patient community with professionally curated evidence based Tips 4 Life, one-on-one coaching and Video Survival Guides and Ebooks featuring leading specialists. The My Bridge 4 Life support platform has been featured in a series of on camera interviews on Rebels Patch.

== National Cancer Institute ==
As the first Creative Director (consulting) for the National Cancer Institute, Holzberg led a team to "evolve" the digital portfolio of the institute's messaging and education platform. Projects involved redesigning and relaunching Cancer.gov, launching the institute's Facebook page, developing NCI’s YouTube channel and directing media experiences that include projects like Prognosis Video Series. The “Smoke Free Women”, “Voices”, “Deep Water”, “Clinical Trials” and “Neuroblastoma” videos were all developed and produced by Holzberg’s team. His presentations on behalf of the National Cancer Institute included this presentation at Digital Communication X.

== Walt Disney Company ==
Holzberg was previously a Vice President / Creative Director for the Walt Disney Company.

At Walt Disney Parks and Resorts Online he was the creative director for projects that included the massively multiplayer online game, Virtual Magic Kingdom (VMK). VMK's far reaching impact is documented in Virtual Magic Kingdom's Second Life and Buzz Lightyear Astro Blasters Online, which paired online players in a virtual world with real players in the theme parks.

At Walt Disney Imagineering he served as the Senior Show Producer, and Imagineering creative director for projects including the 100 Years of Magic and Millennium Celebrations at Walt Disney World, and co-invented Disney's Magic Moment Pins, location sensitive display device, system, and method of providing animation sequences.

Holzberg’s Magic Moments Pins and Magic Moments Game helped launch the Disney pin trading phenomena at Walt Disney World. He presented innovations during his tenure at Disney at events that included The Real Experts Panel: Kids] at Game Developers Conference. Holzberg sought to create immersive experiences in the tradition of Walt Disney's idea of "dimensional storytelling".

Holzberg’s Imagineering history is featured in interviews on:

- The Tiara Talk Show
- Imagination Station

Holzberg is the first Disney Imagineer to create an attraction with a free swimming animatronic figure. DRU, a “Dolphin Robotic Unit” is featured at Disney’s private island, Castaway Cay. Holzberg's dolphin attraction was designed to enable guests to experience and interact with marine mammals without catching and keeping them in captivity.

Post Disney, in partnership with Edge Innovations, recent use of real-time animatronics has resulted in:

- PETA Innovation Award ‘for creating a jaw-dropping animatronic dolphin that has the potential to upend the cruel captive marine mammal industry”
- ABC/Disney, “Ex-Disney Imagineer Roger Holzberg hopes that his robotic creations will soon replace real animals at marine theme parks so that these highly intelligent creatures will no longer be kept in captivity”
- Gizmodo, “the new robotic dolphin swims with an almost eerie level of realism”

== Teaching and publishing ==
Teaching

California Institute of the Arts

- As a professor, Holzberg developed the curriculum and teaches (along with Shannon Scrofano) a course in the Experience Design track called Healthcare By Design: Evolving the patient journey.
- Holzberg is featured on page 39 of The Pool as a CalArts "Citizen Artist" for his work in patient experience design.

Publishing

Books (author)

- Magic String: Jerusalem, a comedic, inspirational and sometimes dark autobiographical collection of short stories. Holzberg was selected as 'artist in residence' for this work at the Mollie New Works Festival in Silverton, Colorado.

Healthcare & Survivorship Learn Guides (co-author)

- Adolescent and Young Adult Cancer: From diagnosis to wellbeing
- Oncofertility: Cancer and Your Fertility Preservation Options
- Pediatric Cancer Survivorship: Life After Cancer Treatment

Contributor (featured in publication)

- Carolyn Handler Miller, Digital Storytelling: A Creator's Guide to Interactive Entertainment (2014), p. 434-5.
- Allison Druin, Cynthia Solomon, Designing Multimedia Environments for Children (1996), p. 10.

== Writing, directing, designing for film, video games and theater ==
Film

- The Living Sea, writer (1995; directed by Greg MacGillivray), which received an Academy Award nomination for best documentary.
- Credited as the co-writer and director of Midnight Crossing (1988; starring Faye Dunaway and Kim Cattrall)
- Writer and director of the animated television film, The Magic 7
- Directed the 2nd unit stunt units for Radioactive Dreams (1985)
- The Sword and the Sorcerer (1982), on which he also designed special effects props and weapons. Cinefantastique Magazine wrote of The Sword and the Sorcerer that "Roger Holzberg's special weapons are inventive creations, particularly Talon's spring-loaded triple-headed sword".

Software & Video Games

- Holzberg produced Steven Spielberg's Director's Chair, a 1996 educational simulation video game, and directed Steven Spielberg in scenes in which Spielberg himself appeared. The game also stars Quentin Tarantino, Jennifer Anniston, and Penn & Teller, as seen in this video trailer. A "choose your own adventure" shareware version of the game is online for free.

Theater

- Desert Fire (co-written with Martin Casella), a look at how the United States government exposed American soldiers to nuclear testing in the 1950s, only to ignore them in the 1970s as they began dying from cancer caused by radiation poisoning.
- The Trial of Mother Jones, toured throughout Wyoming and Colorado and played in schools, community settings, and for union conferences. A review found that the play offered "a unique opportunity to explore motivations and methods to achieve societal change".

== Inventions ==
Holzberg holds patents for four inventions:

- My Bridge 4 Life - A method and system to transition a person from diagnosis to wellbeing.
- Location sensitive display device, system, and method of providing animation sequences.
- Method and system providing a customized audio presentation tailored to a predetermined event sequence.
- Participant interaction with entertainment in real and virtual environments.

== Spokesperson ==
Holzberg is an international spokesperson for the following health and technology companies:

- Hewlett Packard “A Family Legacy”
- GoodRX
- Methuselah Foundation
