= Articulate! =

Board game

Cover of the board game Articulate.

Articulate! is a board game from Drumond Park, for 4 to 20+ players aged 12 and up, from an original concept by Andrew Bryceson. Articulate! players describe words from six different categories (Object, Nature, Random, Person, Action and World) to their team as quickly as possible. The teams move round the board based on the number of words correctly guessed and occasional spinner bonuses. The object of the game is to be the first team to get around the board to the finish space.

There is also a children's version called Articulate for Kids, and a new version was released in 2010 called Articulate Your Life.

== Gameplay ==
The game is played by the teams taking turns to play. When a team is playing a 30 second timer is started and the describer(s) will describe as many words from the relevant category to the guesser(s) in this time. The describer(s) can gesticulate and act but cannot say the word itself, the length, the starting letter, any derivative, or what it rhymes with or sounds like.

The team's piece moves forwards how many words were correctly guessed, and unless the piece lands on the red, orange, or white space, the next team will take their turn:

- If the piece lands on a red or orange space the team will spin the spinner in the centre. Depending on what space is landed on the team will be able to take a different action. A wide green segment will result in a movement forward of two steps for your piece or backwards two steps for another team. A narrow green segment will be the same as the wide but three spaces and an orange or red space results in no action. Then pass the turn on as normal.
- If the piece lands on a white space a control turn is played where the describer(s) from that team describes a word to all teams and the first team to guess correctly has their turn regardless of the order.

When a team reaches or passes finish space they will trigger a control turn and if they win that then they win the game. If they lose then they end their turn and will trigger another control turn on their next turn if they are still at the finish space.

== Board ==
The game contains a circular board, 500 cards with 3,000 words, a spinner, timer, 4 playing pieces and instructions.

An extra set of questions is available in the Articulate! Extra Pack No. 1, which contains 500 new cards (3,000 words).

The children's version only contains 336 cards.

== History ==
The world record for the board game was set in 2017, against four other teams, with a score of 411 cards won. This is an official Guinness World Records recognised award. The players awarded are James Kendrick and Chris Ager.

Originally released in 1992, Articulate! has been in the UK adult game top 10 each year. It was one of the three top selling UK games in 2009 and overtook Trivial Pursuit as the top property in UK adult games.

Articulate Your Life was voted as one of the best new games for 2010 by a panel of expert toy retailers at the 2010 Toy Fair.
