= Don Francisco Te Invita =

- Genre: Talk show
- Presented by: Don Francisco
- Country of origin: United States
- Original language: Spanish
- No. of episodes: 109

Original release
- Network: Telemundo
- Release: 9 October 2016 – 9 December 2018

Don Francisco Te Invita is an American television talk show that premiered on Telemundo on 9 October 2016. It is a Spanish version of the English-language American program The Late Show. The program is presented by Don Francisco, who previously worked at Don Francisco Presenta. On 26 July 2018, Telemundo announced that the show was canceled. The final episode aired on 9 December 2018.

== Ratings ==
Timeslot (ET)	First aired		Last aired	
Timeslot (ET)	Date	Premiere (millions)	Date	Finale (millions)
Sunday 10pm/9c	9 October 2016	2.87	9 December 2018	0.89

=== Episodes ===
No.	Original release date	Guest(s)	Musical/Entertainment Guest(s)	U.S. Viewers (millions)
1	October 9, 2016	Rafael Amaya, Larry Hernandez, Eduardo Magallanes	Chino y Nacho	2.87
2	October 16, 2016	Carlos Yorvick, Espionsa Paz y Adamari	Alfred y Anna	
3	October 23, 2016	Ana Maria Polo and Ariadiana Gutierrez	Gente de Zona	
4	October 30, 2016	Carlos Ponce, Martiza Rodriguez	Sos & Victoria Pretosyans	
5	November 6, 2016	Kate del Castillo	Ricardo Montaner	
6	November 14, 2016	Maria Celeste Arras, Sergio Goyri, Don Chucho Casares	Jesse y Joy	
7	November 20, 2016	Pedro Fernandez, Catherine Siachoque, Christopher Rivera, Jyoti Amgre	Euclides Jimenez Pachugo	
8	November 27, 2016	Aracely Arambula, David Chocarro	Piter Albeiro	1.28
9	December 4, 2016	Carolina Miranda y Michel Dival	Los Tucanes de Tijuana	
10	December 11, 2016	Luis Ernesto Franco, Daniel Phillips, Florinda Mesa	Erik Sprague	
11	December 18, 2016	Lupillo Rivera, Gaby Espino	Jesus Guzman	
12	December 25, 2016	Victor Manuelle, Carmen Villalobos, Jose Diaz Balart	Christmas Special	0.99
13	January 1, 2017	Especial Recap 2016		0.94
14	January 8, 2017	Ivan Grabiel Aguilerra	Raymond Pozo	1.69
15	January 15, 2017	Angelica Vale, Juan Pablo Espinosa	Jochy Jochy, Alexis & Fido	1.58
16	January 22, 2017	Marimar Vega, Jorge Bernal	Ulises Chiades	1.48
17	January 29, 2017	Danna Paola, Joss Favela, Ileana Ros-Lehtinen	Dj Alex Sensation & Gente de Zona	1.38
18	February 5, 2017	Ricardo Sanchez "El Mandril", Fabian Rios, Yuly Ferreira, Street Beatz	Los del Rio	1.12
19	February 12, 2017	Sebastian Caicedo, Prince Royce	Prince Royce, Nico Espinosa	1.47
20	February 19, 2017	Mariana Seone, Maria Jose Cristerna, A.B Quintanilla	Jochy Jochy,	1.22
21	February 26, 2017	Itati Cantoral	Jean Carlos Canela	1.28
22	March 5, 2017	Rebecca Jones, Farruko	Cristian Castro	1.24
23	March 12, 2017	Becky G, Gabriel Porraz, Fuerza de Tijuana	Becky G	1.14
24	March 19, 2017	Miguel Varoni, Kanny Garcia	Kanny Garcia, Carlos "Mono"	1.06
25	March 26, 2017	Eugenio Derbez	Banda Intocable, Franco De Vita	1.09
26	April 2, 2017	Mauricio Ochmann	Stefan Kramer	1.25
27	April 9, 2017	Marisol Del Olmo	Alexis Valdez, Rio Roma, Gustavo Chavez	1.07
28	April 16, 2017	Rosie Rivera, Isabel Burr	Pedro Rivera, Liss Pereira	0.99
29	April 23, 2017	Maria Leon, Daniel Elbittar	Pachuco, Maria Leon	0.98
30	April 30, 2017	J Balvin, Humberto Zurita	J Balvin, Natalia Jimenez	1.03
31	May 7, 2017	Wisin, Sandra Echeverria, Jose Manuel Moreno	CNCO	0.92
32	May 14, 2017	Banda MS, Osvaldo Siliva, Alan Ramirez	Osvaldo Silva & Alan Ramirez, Olga Tañon	0.77
33	May 21, 2017	Alejandro Sanz, Michael Israel	Fonseca	0.81
34	May 28, 2017	Calos Vives, Claudia Elena Vasquez, Charly IACCIO, Jeison Aristizabal	Carlos Vives, Andres Lopez	0.65
35	June 4, 2017	Juanes, Zuleyka Rivera, Daniel Sarcos	Juanes, Adexe & Nau	0.78
36	June 11, 2017	Nacho, Karol G, Andres Cantor	Karol G, Nacho, Alex Magala	0.87
37	June 18, 2017	Raul Gonzales, Fernanda Castillo	Noel Torrez	0.78
38	June 25, 2017	Comedy Special with Carlos Eduardo Rico, Jochy Jochy, Belkis Martínez, Alexis Valdés, Peter Albeiro y Pachuco.		0.96
39	July 2, 2017	Pablo Montero, Rosie Rivera, Samantha Sepulveda	Pato & Ginger	
40	July 9, 2017	Alicia Machado, Arantza Ruiz, Cristina de La Querida del Centauro, Ricardo Polanco, Bianchini	Luis Coronel	0.86
41	July 16, 2017	Jackie Nava	Chyno Miranda, Sin Bandera	0.91
42	July 23, 2017	Antonio Aguilar, Angel Jancito, Carmen Villalobos		0.96
43	July 30, 2017	Illusionism, Magic, Hypnosis Special with Angélica Celaya, Andrés Rieznik, Special Head, Yusnier Viera, Jorge Luengo, Juan Pablo Culasso		1.11
44	August 6, 2017	Majida Issa, Jessica "La Diabla" Franco, Edinta Nazario, Daddy Melquiades	Ednita Nazario	0.98
45	August 13, 2017	Vadhir Derbez, Samadhi Zendejas	Chiquis Rivera	1.11
46	August 20, 2017	Ron Magill	El Dasa, Luis Alberto Aguilero	1.05
47	August 27, 2017	Ana Lorena Sanchez	Justin Quiles, Antigravity, Septima Banda	0.81
48	September 3, 2017	Gerardo Ortiz, Gregorio Pernia,	Voz de Mando	0.91
49	September 10, 2017	Erika Ender, Chuy Lizarraga	Space Cowboy	1.04
50	September 17, 2017	Comedy Special: Aramiz, Alexis Valdes, Liliana Arriaga, Jochy Jochy		1.10
51	October 1, 2017	Roberto Tapia, La Chilanga	Gilberto Santa Rosa	1.03
52	October 8, 2017	Luis Enrique, Laura Flores	Luis Enrique	
53	October 15, 2017	Rashel Diaz, Johnny Hincapie	Charlie Zaa	
54	October 22, 2017	Marjorie de Sousa, Julia Gil, Larry Hernandez, Carlos Gomez		
55	October 29, 2017	Julio Cesar Chavez, Lazaro Arbos	Los Huracanes del Norte, Lazaro Arbos	
56	November 5, 2017	Aracely Arambula, Wandy Karina De Jeus, Enrique Santos, Sebastian Yatra	Kevin Ortiz,	1.18
57	November 12, 2017	Special dedicated to the fight against overweight with Juan Pablo Llano		1.06
58	November 19, 2017	Couples Special with Yuri y Rodrigo Espinosa, Carolina Miranda y Michel Duval; Daniel Sarcos y Alessandra Villegas	Yuri, Michel Duval	
59	November 26, 2017	Jamil Camil, Sabrina Seara, Yamila Rivera	Intocable	
60	December 3, 2017	Zion & Lennox, Johanna Fadul, La Diabla Chica, Juanese Quintero	Zion & Lennox, Cortes Twins	
61	December 10, 2017	Tribute Special To Jenni Rivera		
62	December 17, 2017	Noeila Pompa, Manuel Giral,	Bacilos	
63	December 24, 2017	Christmas Specials with Ana Maria Polo and J Alvarez		
64	January 7, 2018	Stefan Kramer, Alessandra Rampolla	Fonseca	
65	January 14, 2018	Daniela Zapata	Stefan Kramer, Joey Montana	
66	January 21, 2018	Belkis Martinez, Gustavo Rios	Jose Manuel Figueroa, Stefan Kramer	1.14
67	January 28, 2018	Malillany Marin, Sarita Salazar	Victor Manuel	1.20
68	February 4, 2018	MasterChef Latino Special		0.90
69	February 11, 2018	Love and Couples Special	Emmanuel	1.25
70	February 18, 2018	Marjorie de Sousa, Litzy,	Anthony Gonzales, Chef Ennio Carota	1.20
71	February 25, 2018	Alicia Villarreal, Alexander Garcia, Luis Ernesto Franco		1.09
72	March 4, 2018	Khotan, Adriana Barraza, Cessy Casanova	Christian Stoinex, Cornelio Vega Jr.	1.01
73	March 11, 2018	Bad Bunny, Sor Juliana, Jose Reveles	Guadalupe Pineda	1.08
74	March 18, 2018	Jose Feliciano, Felicidad Aveleyra, Angelica Maria, Angelica Vale	MS de Sergio Lizarraga	1.13
75	March 25, 2018	J Balvin, Anitta, Joss Favela,	J Balvin & Anita, Jeon	1.13
76	April 1, 2018	Lucia Mendez, Ana Lucia Dominguez	Joseph Degaldo	1.16
77	April 8, 2018	Diego Bonneta, Cesa Isaconde		1.02
78	April 15, 2018	Chickybombon, Miguel Gurwitz	Bad Bunny, Jesicca Carrillo	0.94
79	April 22, 2018	Jorge & Miguel Gaxiola, Marco Antonio Regil, Gaby Espino	Raphael	1.11
80	April 29, 2018	Fernanda Castillo, Raul Mendez, Tanba, Mariana Seoane, Fidel Rueda	La Chupitos	1.05
81	May 6, 2018	Laura Pausini, Hector el Father	Antonio Martos	0.89
82	May 13, 2018	Erika Csiszer, Rodrigo Alves, Sammy Sadovnik	J Balvin & Anitta	0.75
83	May 20, 2018	Sebastian Yatra, Andrea Valdri, Gilberto Santa Rosa	Sebastian Yatra, Gilberto Santa Rosa	0.87
84	May 27, 2018	Edith Gonzales, Cessy Casanova	Karol G, Regulo Caro	0.68
85	June 3, 2018	2018 FIFA World Coup Special		0.81
86	June 10, 2018	Lary Over, Julio Iglesias Jr.	Fanny Lu	0.76
87	June 17, 2018	Marjorie de Souza, Lupillo Rivera	Lupillo Rivera, José Manuel Figueroa, Pablo Montero	0.81
88	June 24, 2018	Timoteo Pollar	Carolina Gaitan, Los Angeles Azules	0.94
89	July 1, 2018	Women's Special with Marianna Seosane, Fabian Rios, Alessandra Rampolla and More		
90	July 8, 2018	Ninel Conde, Michael Brown	Abraham Mateo	0.81
92	July 22, 2018	Angela Ponce, Diego Torrez	Diego Torres, La Chupitos	0.81
93	July 29, 2018	Comedy Special with Alexis Valdez, Aramiz, Jochy Jochy		0.90
94	August 5, 2018	Mariana Seosane	Kanales, Yuridia	1.01
95	August 12, 2018	Larry Hernandez, Passing Zone	Bronco, HA-ASh	0.91
97	August 19, 2018	Carlos Rivera, Jessica Cediel	Becky G	0.89
98	August 26, 2018	Paulina Rubio, Nacho	Paulina Rubio & Nacho	0.82
99	September 2, 2018	Pedro Rivera, Lupillo Rivera, Chiquis Rivera		0.86
100	September 9, 2018	100th Show Special		0.81
101	September 16, 2018	Il Volo	Il Volo, Raymix	1.04
102	September 23, 2018	Gergonio Pernia, Angelito Garica	Huracanes Del Norte	1.17
103	October 7, 2018	Francisco Bolivar, Laura Zapata	Rieleros Del Norte	0.98
104	October 14, 2018	Eden Muñoz, Gerardo Ortiz, Sabrina Seara, Alexis Valdez		0.89
105	December 2, 2018	Lucia Vivez, Hermanos Montater,		0.97
106	December 9, 2018	Last Episode Special with Luis Fonsi, Christian Nodal, Prince Royce and Maria Celeste Arrarás		0.89
