= John C. Kilkenny =

American film studio executive

John Kilkenny is a former President of Visual Effects at 20th Century Fox. His division budgeted, produced and oversaw all visual effects on feature films made by the studio's production units, 20th Century Fox, Fox 2000 Pictures and Fox Searchlight Pictures.

In his position at the studio, Mr. Kilkenny collaborated with filmmakers and helped them create and design unique and exciting visuals through the use of visual effects. As an executive, he oversaw the Academy Award®-winning effects on both Avatar which was written and directed by Academy Award-winning filmmaker James Cameron (Titanic) and Life of Pi, directed by Academy Award®-winning filmmaker Ang Lee: and the Academy Award®-nominated effects on The Martian, X-Men: Days of Future Past, Dawn of the Planet of the Apes, Prometheus, and Rise of the Planet of the Apes. Kilkenny also oversaw the effects for such loved films as Night at the Museum, Night at the Museum: Battle of the Smithsonian and the Alvin and the Chipmunks franchise. Other 20th Century Fox blockbuster films that drew success under Kilkenny's watch include X-Men: The Last Stand, Live Free or Die Hard and Fantastic Four: Rise of the Silver Surfer. His division helped create visuals in over 150 films spanning his almost two decades with the studio.

Mr Kilkenny also negotiated the acquisition of Technoprops and helped transform the company into one of the world's largest virtual production hubs by creating the Fox VFX Lab. The Lab was a 32,000 sq ft production facility employing over 170 artists who helped innovate and standardize virtual production. The Lab used the latest techniques to develop and execute creative content and cutting edge pre-visualizations for Film/TV/Game and VR productions. The Lab was awarded a Virtual Production Patent, and in 2021 Technoprops was recognized for their innovation by receiving a Scientific and Technical Achievement Academy Award®.

Prior to joining Fox's senior executive ranks, Mr. Kilkenny was an associate producer//visual effects producer on the box-office hits Garfield and I, Robot, the latter earning an Academy Award® nomination for best achievement in visual effects. He also was the visual effects producer on the films Dr. Dolittle 2, Daredevil, Gone in 60 Seconds and Star Trek: Insurrection.

Kilkenny began his career in motion picture visual effects at the renowned effects house Digital Domain, where he became head producer in the company's commercial division. He has also worked as a freelance commercials producer for clients like Budweiser, Toyota, Chevrolet, and many others.

As a student at the University of Arizona, Kilkenny studied radio/television, interned at the NBC affiliate in Tucson, and became a sports producer at the local ABC station. In addition, he headed the Association of Students concert division, booking concerts headlined by superstars like Huey Lewis and the News, Barry Manilow, Kenny Rogers, and Hall and Oats.

The university has recognized Kilkenny for his achievements in the film industry by awarding him an honorary Doctorate of Fine Arts during the spring of 2009 graduation ceremony.

Mr. Kilkenny is an active member in both the Academy of Motion Picture Arts and Sciences and the Producers Guild of America.
