= DG (company) =

First National online service platform

Digital Generation Systems, Inc.
- Industry: Digital media services
- Founded: 1991 in San Francisco, CA
- Defunct: February 7, 2014
- Fate: Acquired by Extreme Reach
- Headquarters: Irving, Texas
- Area served: Worldwide
- Parent: Extreme Reach

Digital Generation Systems, Inc., commonly referred to as DG, was the very first National, digital online service platform in the world. Invented expressly to deliver broadcast radio commercials over POTS lines, replacing the method of sending 5 inch reels of magnetic recording tape via FedEx air delivery to anywhere in North America. Upgraded parts and procedures were invented enabling the highest quality, uncompressed Dolby digital audio possible for clients in advertising, production and radio broadcast industries. DG was created for and used exclusively by ad agencies and production studios, ultimately delivering studio-quality audio ads daily to over ten-thousand broadcast radio stations, each ad being transmitted within an hour. A decade later, a new owner used a wider combination of advanced telecommunication systems for television, cable, network and print publishing destinations. On February 7, 2014, DG's TV advertising business was acquired by Extreme Reach, Inc. and its online advertising business was spun off into Sizmek, Inc.

== History ==
DG temporarily changed its handle to DG FastChannel when DG Systems and FastChannel Networks merged in 2006.

DG Systems initially used POTS to distribute later adding web-based and satellite technology for advertising content distribution thereby all but eliminating the need for reel to reel audio tape and CDs for radio station spot distribution. Later the system replaced the need for videotape distribution for television. DG Systems created a hybrid system that allowed for content delivery through either the satellite distribution system or through the Internet.

FastChannel Networks used the Internet for delivery of content. FastChannel Networks created a Web-based interface for developing, managing and delivering advertising content. Using the Web, post houses, advertisers and agencies were able to collaborate, manage and distribute advertising content through an online application.

In 2009, DG was ranked fifth on the Fortune Small Business list of the US' 100 Fastest Growing Small Public Companies. It also ranked fifth on the 2009 Fortune Fastest Growing Companies in the World listing.

In 2011, DG began buying up digital ad serving technologies in the online space, specifically focused on Rich Media vendors with global reach. Such companies include Mediamind Technologies, EyeWonder and the Unicast platform.

In 2011, DG was responsible for the first second-screen ad being served in connection with Channel 4's Million Pound Drop TV game show. The second screen ad format was watched by 20% of the online playing audience according to Dean Donaldson, Global Head of Media Innovation.

In August 2013, DG agreed to spin off their online ad tech operations (branded as DG MediaMind and consisting of the merged operations of the former MediaMind, EyeWonder, Unicast, Peer39, and Republic Project) into a new company named Sizmek, Inc. and to sell their remaining operations to Extreme Reach in a deal valued at $485 million. The money was used to pay off all of DG's debt and to fund a $3/share dividend to shareholders. All of DG's cash and working capital was then transferred to Sizmek and Extreme Reach acquired the remaining operations. The deal closed on February 7, 2014.

In March 2019, Sizmek filed for Chapter 11 bankruptcy.

== Network Reach ==
In 2011, MediaMind, the online division of DG at the time, was the second largest online ad Server behind Google, reaching 700 million unique users, as accredited by the Media Rating Council.
