= Don Francisco (television host) =

Chilean television personality (born 1940)

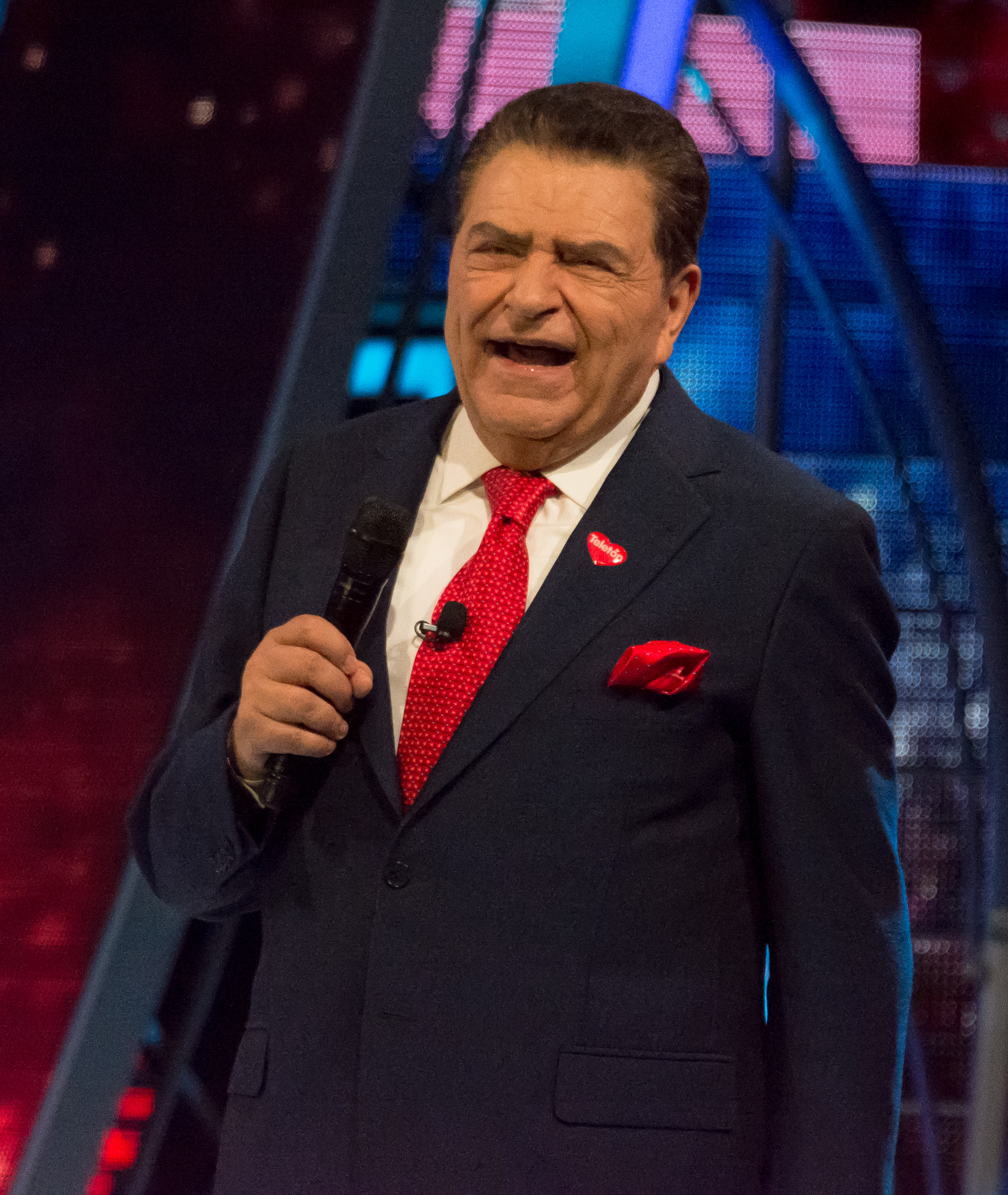
- Don Francisco in 2018
- Born: Mario Luis Kreutzberger Blumenfeld; 28 December 1940 (age 85); Talca, Chile
- Occupation: Television host
- Years active: 1962–present
- Television: Sábado Gigante; Don Francisco Presenta; Don Francisco Te Invita
- Spouse: Teresa "Temmy" Muchnik Rosenblum (m. 1962)
- Children: 4

Mario Luis Kreutzberger Blumenfeld (Latin American Spanish: [ˈmaɾjo ˈkɾojtsβeɾɣeɾ]; born 28 December 1940), better known by his stage name Don Francisco (pronounced [doɱ fɾanˈsisko]), is a Chilean television host known for presenting several variety, talk and game shows. A popular personality on the Univision network reaching Spanish-speaking viewers in the United States, he is recognized for hosting shows including Sábado Gigante, Don Francisco Presenta and Don Francisco Te Invita.

== Early life ==
Mario Luis Kreutzberger Blumenfeld was born in Talca, Chile, on 28 December 1940, to Anna Blumenfeld Neufeld and Erick Kreutzberger, of German Jewish ancestry who fled to Chile to escape the Holocaust. He has always been fluent in both Spanish and German; the latter, which was used with his parents at home when he was growing up, was his first language. He is of Jewish faith.

== Television career ==
=== Sábado Gigante ===
Kreutzberger started a TV show in 1962, and he named it Show Dominical ("Sunday's Show") on Canal 13; the program's broadcasts were subsequently moved to Saturdays, and henceforth, was renamed Sábado Gigante. In it, he adapted many of the formulas he had seen in American television to the Chilean public. The show became an instant hit that lasted over 53 years. In 1986, the show began to be produced by SIN in Miami, Florida, with the same formula used in Chile, with the slightly different name of Sábado Gigante to KMEX-DT channel 34 Los Angeles.

For the next six years, Kreutzberger developed a three-hour-long variety show, which included contests, comedy, interviews and a traveling camera section. The traveling camera, or Cámara Viajera (originally La Película Extranjera, The Foreign Movie), has taken "Don Francisco" to over 185 countries worldwide, many of them more than once. Kreutzberger in his show has interviewed many celebrities, including Roberto Durán, Cristina Saralegui, Sussan Taunton, Charytín, Bill Clinton, George W. Bush, Barack Obama, Bill Gates and many others. Through a talent partnership with Memo Flores of Jugaremos en Familia, Sábado Gigante has helped launch the careers of many famous entertainers, such as Lili Estefan, Sissi Fleitas, and numerous others.

On 18 April 2015, Don Francisco announced the show would come to an end in September after 53 years on air. Sábado Gigante aired its final episode titled "Hasta Siempre" on 19 September 2015.

In May 2026, TelevisaUnivision announced that Kreutzberger would return to Univision with a new limited interview series featuring major personalities from the Hispanic world, more than a decade after the cancellation of Sábado Gigante in 2015. The program, titled Gigantes con Don Francisco, premiered on October 11, 2026.

=== Other endeavours ===
Immediately after the 1973 Chilean coup d'état the military sought after Kreutzberger. They took him to the vandalized house of Salvador Allende, where corpses of guards were still on the floor. The soldiers asked him to report on the events. Kreutzberger declined the offer, encouraging the captain who had approached him to take the role of reporter himself.

Kreutzberger hosted the talk show Don Francisco Presenta from 2001 to 2012. He has also hosted Chilean versions of ¿Quién merece ser millonario? (which is based on the original British format of the international Who Wants to Be a Millionaire? franchise), Deal or No Deal, and Atrapa los Millones (which is based on the American format of the international Money Drop franchise). He hosted the first three seasons of Atrapa los Millones before retiring from the program in 2014; Diana Bolocco became the host for the program's fourth season in 2015, and would eventually remain with the show until its cancellation.

Kreutzberger voiced Governor Bernardo de Gálvez in "The Great Galvez", a 2002 episode of the PBS Kids series Liberty's Kids. In 2015, he appeared as himself in the movie The 33, about the 2010 Copiapó mining accident.

On 1 March 2016, following the conclusion of Sábado Gigante, Don Francisco announced his return to television and signed a multi-year deal with Telemundo. His first show on the network was Don Francisco Te Invita, a Sunday night talk show considered to be a spiritual successor to both Don Francisco Presenta and Sábado Gigante, debuted on 9 October 2016. The Telemundo show was canceled in late 2018 after the airing of 100 episodes.

== Advertising ==
Don Francisco has been in commercials for La Curaçao Department Stores. He was even present for the opening of La Curaçao's South Gate, California and Arizona locations.

He also appears in TV spots for the Mexican telecom company Claro.

In 2010, the U.S. Social Security Administration enlisted Don Francisco to appear in a series of public service announcements to reach out to American Hispanics about the benefits of Social Security.

== Philanthropy ==
After visiting the "Sociedad Pro Ayuda del Niño Lisiado", Kreutzberger began to use his image on television to promote and host the Teletón, a TV charity show for disabled Chilean children, which he has done since 1978. There have been more than 40 telethons over 45 years. He is also the Hispanic spokesperson for the U.S. Muscular Dystrophy Association, in which he also appears in a pre-recorded piece on its annual telethon, to appeal to Hispanics to donate. He retired from hosting the show in 2021, at the end of that year's airing of the program.

Kreutzberger was also the first host of the Teletón USA telethon, which was introduced in December 2012 on the Univision network; the event and charity is based on the popular Teletón in Chile.

== Lawsuit ==
In 1992, Kreutzberger was sued by one of his models for sexual harassment, but the suit was settled out of court.

== Honours ==
His show was in world's longest running TV variety show, according to Guinness World Records.

Kreutzberger has received numerous awards, as well as a star on the Hollywood Walk of Fame (on 7018 Hollywood Blvd.).

On 1 March 2012, Kreutzberger was inducted into the Television Academy Hall of Fame.

On 8 September 2015, the city of New York named a street in the Washington Heights district in honor of Kreutzberger, named "Don Francisco Boulevard".

On 11 April 2018, the Jewish Community of Chile recognized Mario Kreutzberger as "Javer Olam" (friend of the world).
