= Million Dollar Money Drop =

American game show

- Genre: Game show
- Developed by: Endemol
- Directed by: Ron de Moraes
- Presented by: Kevin Pollak
- Theme music composer: ispy music
- Country of origin: United States
- Original language: English
- No. of seasons: 1
- No. of episodes: 12

Production
- Executive producer: Jeff Apploff
- Production location: The Culver Studios
- Running time: 60 minutes (including ads)
- Production company: Endemol USA

Original release
- Network: Fox
- Release: December 20, 2010 – February 1, 2011

Related
- The Million Pound Drop

Million Dollar Money Drop is an American game show that aired on Fox in the United States and Canada. It is based on the UK flagship series The Million Pound Drop Live (now The £100K Drop), but featured an entirely different game format and its show's set (blue as opposed to red, and a different music theme). The series is hosted by Kevin Pollak.

The show premiered on December 20, 2010 and ended on February 1, 2011. On May 18, 2011, TVSeriesFinale.com reported that Fox had cancelled Million Dollar Money Drop and would not be producing a second season. Despite the cancellation, however, more than 15 different international versions of the program will continue to air in other countries; the original version continued to run until the last episode on August 23, 2019.

== Game format ==
A team of two people with a pre-existing relationship was presented with US$1 million in $20 bills, banded in 50 bundles of $20,000 each. Teams are presented with seven general knowledge multiple-choice questions during the course of the game; the first three questions have four answers, while the next three questions have three answers, and a seventh and final question has two.

The contestants choose one of two categories at the beginning of each round. Each answer option corresponds to a different trapdoor or "drop"; only one answer is correct. The contestants have a fixed amount of time to distribute all the money among the drops as they see fit; however, they were required to leave at least one drop "clear", meaning that no money may be allocated on at least one answer. Teams are required to place any remaining money bundles onto the drops, as bundles that are not placed on a drop when time runs out are forfeited. The timer may be stopped early by the teams if they are satisfied with their choice of answers.

After the timer either runs out or is stopped, the drops for the incorrect answers are opened; any money placed on them falls down a chute and is removed from play by security guards beneath the stage, while any money placed on the correct answer is carried forward to the next question. This process is repeated until at any point where the team ran out of money and loses, or after the final question; if they were correct, they win any remaining money retained for its answer.

The time limits and number of answers were as follows:

Question(s)	Number of answers	Time limit (seconds)
1–3	4	60
4–5	3	75
6	3	90
7	2	None (60)

=== Quick Change ===
The team could use the "Quick Change" once during the entire game on any of the first six questions with an imposed time limit. When a "Quick Change" is used, teams were given an additional 30 seconds to reallocate any money on any other answers. If, at any point, teams did not leave at least an answer without money (i.e. all four answers had allocated money in it) or if they did not risk all of their remaining money when time ran out, it was automatically used; however, if the "Quick Change" is used prior, the team faced immediate disqualification from the game.

=== Final Fact ===
During the seventh and final question, upon placing the money on any one answer, the host then revealed a piece of information about the answers. They were then given 60 seconds to finalize their answers (either by leaving as it is or reallocating the money to the other drop).

== Broadcast history ==
=== Ratings ===
For the twelve episodes aired, the average viewership was 5.03 million.

=== Contestant winnings ===
The highest cash won during the series run was $300,000, which was won by Nathan Moore and Lana McKissack on an episode aired January 18, 2011. A total of 12 teams left the game empty-handed.

== Online play-along ==
Like the original UK version, the show introduced an online interactive play-along aired during the season finale. During the show's broadcast, viewers played along live with the contestants in the game, answering the same questions as in the show's broadcast. At the end of each round, viewers were ranked on the leaderboard based on how fast they answered and the "virtual cash" (money that was not actually won) allocated onto the correct drop. Despite the success of the online component, which would have become a regular show component, it was never materialized due to the show's cancellation.

== Controversies ==
On the season premiere, Gabe Okoye and Brittany Mayti lost $800,000 on a question that asked, "Which of these was sold in stores first?" The three possible answers were: Macintosh computer, Sony Walkman, and Post-it Notes. Gabe placed the bulk of the team's money on the answer "Post-it notes." The correct answer was then revealed to be Sony Walkman.

Later, viewers began to dispute the accuracy of the question because of information on the Internet that indicated Post-It Notes were "launched" or "introduced" under the name "Press 'N Peel" in four cities in 1977, based on an interview with the inventors of the Post-It Note published in the Financial Times. On April 6, 1980, the product debuted in US stores as "Post-It Notes." The Sony Walkman went on sale in Japan on July 1, 1979, and was later introduced to the US in June 1980.

On December 21, 2010, Gawker published an article on this controversy, and the website was later contacted by a Fox representative. Jeff Apploff, the show's executive producer, initially issued the following statement: "The integrity of the questions and answers on our show are our No. 1 priority. In this case, our research team spoke directly with 3M, and they confirmed that although they had given out free samples in test markets in 1977 and 1978, it wasn't until 1980 that Post-Its were sold in stores. Million Dollar Money Drop stands behind the answer that was revealed on the show." Two days later, Apploff issued another statement: "Unfortunately the information our research department originally obtained from 3M regarding when Post-it notes were first sold was incomplete... As a result of new information we have received from 3M, we feel it is only fair to give our contestants, Gabe and Brittany, another shot to play Million Dollar Money Drop even though this question was not the deciding question in their game. The revised information regarding the Post-it is as follows: the product was originally tested for sale in four cities under the name 'Press 'N Peel' in 1977, sold as 'Post-its' in 1979 when the rollout introduction began and sold nationwide in 1980."

On December 28, 2010, host Kevin Pollak said, "They never had a chance to win that money. Ever. No matter what," and added, "This story is a moot point." He provided further detail when he said, "They lost everything on the next question. It's a non-story."

On September 25, 2012, BuzzerBlog reported that the next couple to play after Gabe and Brittany, Andrew and Patricia Murray, also planned to sue Fox and Endemol because they also had a question with a similar manner: "According to the data security firm IMPERVA, what's the most common computer password?" (The choices were "PASSWORD", "123456", and "ILOVEYOU"). They placed the $580,000 they had left on "PASSWORD"; however, during the show's broadcast, "123456" was the correct answer. In a statement from the Murrays, "IMPERVA did not conduct its own objective survey of computer users but rather supports its assertion that 123456 is the most common password based on analysis of a hacking incident involving a website known as RockYou.com"; the couple maintained that had they known that the question was pertaining to that incident, they would have "hedged their bets and played differently". The couple sued the show for $580,000.

== Status ==
On January 22, 2019, it was reported by Variety that Michael Strahan's SMAC Entertainment and Endemol Shine North America are shopping for a revival of Money Drop in the U.S. According to Strahan, he said that "I was in London the first time I saw 'Money Drop' and I immediately knew we had to help bring it back to the U.S." He also said that "On behalf of myself, Constance Schwartz-Morini and the rest of the team at SMAC, we're excited to take 'Money Drop' to market with the amazing team at Endemol Shine and make it SMAC's third game show next to The $100,000 Pyramid and The Joker's Wild." Strahan would also serve as executive producer on the show; however, no network is currently attached but it has been said to be looking into potential primetime and daytime opportunities for the show including national syndication. Michael Weinberg, executive vice president of syndication at Endemol Shine North America said that "We are thrilled to partner with Michael and the team at SMAC Entertainment to develop an all-new version of the 'Money Drop' for an American audience." Weinberg also said that "This is a format that has worked successfully all over the world and the game concept itself is a lot of fun and engaging."
