= Stein Studios =

Television production facility in Ratmalana, Sri Lanka

- Type: Subsidiary
- Industry: Mass media, Film studio, Television production
- Founded: February 6, 2009; 17 years ago
- Founder: The Capital Maharaja Group
- Headquarters: Ratmalana, Western Province, Sri Lanka
- Key people: Sashi Rajamahendran (Chairman, CMG)
- Services: Television production, post-production, event hosting
- Owner: Capital Maharaja Group
- Parent: MTV Channel (Pvt) Ltd / Capital Maharaja Group
- Website: www.steinstudios.lk

Stein Studios is a television production facility and multi-purpose entertainment complex located in Ratmalana, Sri Lanka. Established on 6 February 2009 by the Capital Maharaja Group on the site of a former industrial manufacturing plant, the 5.7 ha (14 acres) campus houses three primary named soundstages alongside extensive post-production facilities. Operating under the slogan "Where Dreams Come True", it is recognised as one of the largest purpose-built indoor media production complexes in South Asia.

The complex serves as the principal production centre for CMG's broadcast networks—including Sirasa TV, Shakthi TV, and TV1—and acts as a production partner for international distributors such as ITV Studios, Sony Pictures Television, Fremantle, Banijay, and the Asia-Pacific Broadcasting Union (ABU).

== History ==
In 2009, the Capital Maharaja Group repurposed its former S-lon industrial manufacturing factory in Ratmalana, a southern suburb of Colombo, into a dedicated media production facility. The site was developed to address a domestic shortage of large-capacity indoor studio venues capable of hosting live audience broadcasts and complex technical infrastructure.

On 24 March 2023, one of the complex's primary international soundstages was formally dedicated as the Gamini Fonseka Studio in honour of Sri Lankan cinema actor, director, and former Deputy Speaker of Parliament Gamini Fonseka.

On 10 June 2023, coinciding with the 25th anniversary of Sirasa TV, the complex's largest soundstage was named the R. Rajamahendran Studio, in memory of the chairman of the Capital Maharaja Group, R. Rajamahendran.

== Facilities and infrastructure ==
The Stein Studios campus spans 5.7 ha (14 acres) and is accessible via four primary road connections within the Colombo District. The complex features a dedicated car park accommodating over 500 vehicles and event infrastructure capable of hosting upwards of 5,000 visitors per event.

=== Soundstages ===
The facility features three primary, purpose-built named studios:

- RR Studio (The Founders Block): the largest studio on the campus, a 1,375.1 m^{2} (14,801 sq ft) (55 m × 25 m (180 ft × 82 ft)) floor area with a 7.6 m (25 ft) grid height and a 368 m^{2} (3,960 sq ft) balcony. Designed with modular capabilities, it features panoramic video walls for VR integration and programmable lighting grids. The space operates as a multi-purpose auditorium supporting maximum capacities of 900 for banquets, 1,500 in theatre seating, and 2,500 for standing live concerts or DJ events.
- Gamini Fonseka Studio: a 482.5 m^{2} (5,194 sq ft) (30 m × 16 m (98 ft × 53 ft)) studio with a 6.4 m (21 ft) grid height. It is equipped with a 7 to 12 HD camera setup via fibre connectivity, steadicams, and jimmy jibs. It serves as the primary hub for major franchised reality television shows.
- Sunil Perera Studio: a 3,153.5 sq ft (292.97 m^{2}) (18.1 m × 16.2 m (59.5 ft × 53 ft)) medium-scale studio featuring a five-camera broadcast setup. It is primarily utilised for political debates, international sports commentary, and smaller-scale corporate productions.

=== Production services ===
In addition to floor space, Stein Studios provides in-house technical and post-production departments:

- Technical and Post-Production: The facility houses high-end HD edit suites (operating Final Cut Pro, Avid, and Premiere), nine graphics and animation workstations for VFX, and over 1,000 console-operated digital lighting rigs.
- Audio and Voice: Stein Studios operates a dedicated podcast production space, custom sound design and mastering studios, and exclusive professional voice dubbing suites.
- Art and Styling: In-house departments cater to set construction, prop design, wardrobe, and standard-to-HD makeup, including prosthetic and special effects styling.

== Productions and programming ==
=== Television franchises ===
Stein Studios is known for simultaneously producing multiple localised versions of international television formats for distribution on Sirasa TV.

Production	Format owner	Local network	Notes
Sirasa Lakshapathi	Sony Pictures Television (Who Wants to Be a Millionaire?)	Sirasa TV	Filmed in The Gamini Fonseka Studio; produced in three different languages.
Shakthi Maha Lakshathipathi	Sony Pictures Television (Who Wants to Be a Millionaire?)	Sirasa TV	Filmed in The Gamini Fonseka Studio; produced in three different languages.
Sri Lanka's Got Talent	Fremantle / Syco Entertainment	Sirasa TV	Filmed in The Gamini Fonseka Studio.
The Voice Sri Lanka	ITV Studios (The Voice)	Sirasa TV	Premiered in 2020; renewed through Season 3 in 2025.
The Voice Teens Sri Lanka	ITV Studios (The Voice Kids)	Sirasa TV	Premiered in 2019; recorded over 165 million YouTube views during its initial run.
Sirasa Catchpoint	ITV Studios (Catchpoint)	Sirasa TV	First Asian commission of the physical game show format, launched in July 2025.
Five Million Money Drop	Banijay (The Money Drop)	Sirasa TV	Premiered in 2022.

=== Sports broadcasting ===
Between 2022 and 2025, Stein Studios operated as the central production hub for International Cricket Council (ICC) broadcasts in Sri Lanka after MTV Channel (Pvt) Ltd secured exclusive domestic free-to-air rights. Operating primarily out of the Sunil Perera Studio and dedicated sports suites, the facility provided live pre-match, mid-innings, and post-game analytical programming across Sinhala (Sirasa TV), Tamil (Shakthi TV), and English (TV1) audio feeds.

== Events and corporate partnerships ==
Beyond broadcast television, Stein Studios operates as a major corporate venue and international convention centre. The complex provides production and event hosting services for prominent domestic and multinational corporate clients, including Coca-Cola, Nestlé, Hatton National Bank (HNB), Elephant House, Softlogic, Brandix, and Sri Lanka Cricket.

Notable galas and international summits hosted at the venue include:

- Diplomatic Summits: the inaugural Innovation Island Summit (co-hosted by the Observer Research Foundation, the High Commission of India, and CMG, featuring 150 delegates from 50 countries), the International Bali Process Business & Government Forum (resulting in 'The Colombo Commitment'), and the 2024 UN Human Rights Day Celebration.
- Corporate and entertainment galas: The Road to Lux Reedi Rayak 2024 at Mount Lavinia Hotel, produced by Stein Studios team, cinematic awards, the Capital Maharaja Group 'Executive of the Year' (EOTY) Awards, and major commercial product launches such as Browns Agriculture's TAFE Dynatrack unveilings.
