= Api Nodanna Live =

Sri Lankan comedy group

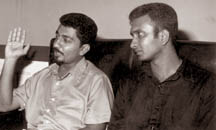
- Gaminda Priyaviraj (left) & Suneth Chithrananda (right) were interviewed by Sunday Observer at the time Api Nodanna Live was on-air (2003)

Comedy career
- Years active: 2002–present
- Medium: Internet; theatre; television
- Genres: Absurdist comedy; sketch; observational comedy
- Members: Gaminda Priyaviraj; Suneth Chithrananda
- Former members: Janaka Ranasinghe; Banura Malith Hettiarachchi

YouTube information
- Channel: Malli Podi Malli - CMPM CMPM
- Years active: 2016-present
- Subscribers: 192K
- Views: 18,638,838
- Last updated: 6 April 2026
- Website: www.youtube.com/@CmpmcomedyChannel

Api Nodanna Live is a Sri Lankan comedy sketch television show that was broadcast by Sirasa TV. It starred (the then relatively unknown) Gaminda Priyaviraj and Suneth Chithrananda as the characters Podi Malli and Chooti Malli. Both names connote younger brother. However, chooti usually has more emphasis, so Chooti Malli is probably to be considered the younger of the two characters.

Api Nodanna Live started in Dec 2002 and lasted up to early 2004. It was a hit at that time with the leading presenters of Podi Malli and Chooty Malli, and was supported by characters Sudu Malli and Jaya Sri. The first season aired for 1 hour where second season aired for 30 minutes.

The sequel, Api Nodanna Live season 2, was started on 18 February 2008 and telecasted every Saturday at 7.30pm prime time on Sirasa TV . Since the second season commenced bit later than the first season, it starred with women presenters, Podi Nangi and Chooti Nangi. It was directed by Gaminda Priyaviraj, and written by both Priyaviraj and Chithrananda. The show became the most popular on Sri Lanka at that time. The abbreviation for the show, "ala", means potato in the Sinhala language, a word which is also used to imply "failure" in a comic sense. The two presenters became famous through the show and became the two main players in Sri Lankan television comedy.

Currently the duo are conducting stage comedy shows in both local and international theatres as well as radio shows.

== Early days ==
Gaminda and Suneth joined Sirata tv as dubbing artist in 99-00 period even though they wanted to become a director and a cameramen respectively. while they were working on Sirasa tv they also did some comedy sketches in Sirasa FM around 2002 and got the experience in both TV and Radio field. At that time Gaminda had an idea to direct a tv program and they got the approval from Sirasa TV creative director Nimal Lakshapathiarachchi. Initially it was planned to do with Mahendra Perera who looked similar to Gaminda at that time but Mahendra was in a tight schedule with his other work and finally Suneth became Gaminda's partner. They didn't have any studio to shoot the first few episode so they did it at one of their friend's house.

== Characters ==
=== Main characters ===
- Gaminda Priyaviraj as "Podi Malli"
- Suneth Chithrananda as "Chooty Malli"
- Janaka Ranasinghe as "Sudu Malli"
- Banura Malith Hettiarachchi as "Jaya Sri"

=== Other supporting characters ===
- Athula Jayasingha
- Anura Jayantha
- Thusitha S Karawita
- Hileriyan Perera
- Ulapane Gunasekara ( d:2020)
- Shyamalee Livera
- Rochana Wimaladewa
- Sameera
- Priyantha Roy
