= ABU Radio Song Festival =

- Generic logo used for the ABU Radio Song Festivals.
- Genre: Song festival
- Created by: ABU
- No. of episodes: 6 festivals

Production
- Production company: Asia-Pacific Broadcasting Union

Original release
- Release: 11 October 2012 – 31 October 2019

The ABU Radio Song Festival is a biennial non-competitive gala that showcases songs or instrumentals by musicians across Asia, organised by the Asia-Pacific Broadcasting Union (ABU), and is based on the Eurovision Song Contest. The format consists of a non-televised semi-final and grand final which is broadcast.

Participating countries which have full or additional full ABU membership are invited to submit a song from an act that is unsigned to any record label. These entries are listened to by a panel of jury members, who select fifteen to proceed towards the radio festival final, were another panel of judges determining the top-5 prize winners. The grand final may be broadcast live via radio and television, or as a delayed live recorded broadcast for national broadcasters who may wish to add subtitles in their native languages.

== Development ==
Participation since 2012: Entered at least once Never entered, although eligible to do so Entry intended, but later withdrew

The Asia-Pacific Broadcasting Union (ABU) had already run an international song contest for its members inspired by the Eurovision Song Contest between 1985 and 1987, called the ABU Popular Song Contest, with 14 countries of the Asia-Pacific region competing. The show had a similar concept to the current radio song festival with winners being chosen by a professional jury. South Korea, New Zealand and Australia celebrated victories in this competition. ABU later co-produced the ABU Golden Kite World Song Festival in Malaysia with participation of Asia-Pacific countries, as well as Yugoslavia and Finland. This also ran for three editions, from 1989 to 1991.

Shortly before launching the ABU Song Festival, the ABU had been considering the possibility to organize the ABU ASEAN TV Song Festival in Thailand. Historically, ASEAN song contests had been organized in periods between 1981 and 1997, however since 2011 the ASEAN Festival had been organized between local Radio stations as Bintang Radio ASEAN. The ABU outlined a plan about a "television song festival" based on the style of the Eurovision Song Contest following the cancellation of Our Sound. Kenny Kihyung Bae, chosen to the project manager, attended Eurovision Song Contest 2012 in Baku, Azerbaijan to learn more about the contest before putting it to work.

In November 2011, the ABU announced that they would organize its own TV and Radio Song Festivals to take place in Seoul, the South Korean capital, in time with 49th General Assembly in October 2012. The name Asiavision Song Contest was initially mentioned as a possibility, but they were later officially titled ABU TV Song Festival and ABU Radio Song Festival. According to the ABU, the deadline for participation applications for ABU TV Song Festival 2012 was 18 May 2012.

== Format ==
The ABU Radio Song Festival is a concert performance for musicians, who are not under contract with any label. The ABU recommends its members to introduce participating musicians and their songs on radio. Every participant is chosen by one national radio broadcaster. A jury represented by ABU members chooses 15 finalists from 26 submissions. The finalists perform during the general assembly of the ABU. Another jury awards the best artists.

== Participation ==
Participation in the contest is open to members of the Asia-Pacific Broadcasting Union.

Table key

Inactive – Countries who have participated in the past but are now inactive.

Country	Broadcaster(s)	Debut year	Most recent entry	Number of entries	Wins
Afghanistan	RTA	2018	2018	1	
Australia	CRA	2012	2014	2	
Bangladesh	BB	2019	2019	1	
Bhutan	BBS; CR101	2012	2014	2	
Brunei	RTB	2012	2015	3	
China	CNR	2016	2016	2	
Fiji	FBC	2012	2012	1	
India	AIR	2012	2018	10	
Indonesia	RRI	2012	2019	8	
Iran	IRIB	2012	2019	4	
Kazakhstan	KA	2018	2018	1	
Kyrgyzstan	KTRK	2012	2012	1	
Macau	TDM	2016	2018	2	
Malaysia	RTM; Astro All Asian Network	2012	2014	3	
Maldives	PSM	2015	2019	6	
Myanmar	MRTV	2015	2016	2	
Nepal	Radio Nepal	2016	2019	3	
Pakistan	PBC	2012	2014	2	
Romania	Radio Romania	2016	2016	1	
Singapore	Mediacorp	2012	2016	4	
South Korea	KBS 2FM; KBS Radio 2	2012	2016	5	1
Sri Lanka	MBC Networks	2014	2019	3	
Sudan	Sudan Radio	2012	2012	1	
Thailand	NBT	2014	2016	2	
Turkey	TRT	2018	2018	1	
Turkmenistan	TTV	2018	2019	2	
Vanuatu	ABC; Vanuatu Radio	2012	2012	1	
Vietnam	VOV	2012	2019	5	

== Hosting ==
Year	Date	Host country	Host city	Venue	Participants
2012	11 October 2012	South Korea	Seoul	KBS Hall	13^{[a]}^{[b]}
2014	23 May 2014	Sri Lanka	Colombo	Stein Studios	12
2015	29 May 2015	Myanmar	Yangon	National Theatre of Yangon	10
2016	26 April 2016	China	Beijing	China National Radio Auditorium	14
2017	Cancelled^{[c]}				
2018	11 July 2018	Kazakhstan	Astana	Kazmedia Centre	10
2019	31 October 2019	Bangladesh	Dhaka	Hotel Intercontinental	8

== Notes and references ==
=== Notes ===
1. Fiji had initially selected Sevanaia Yacalevu to represent the Pacific nation with the song "Time For A Change", but later withdrew from competition.
2. Sri Lanka had initially selected Surendra Perera to represent the South Asian nation with the song "Wahi Pabalu Sali", but later withdrew from competition.
3. Due to the death of King Bhumibol Adulyadej, the 2017 ABU Radio Song Festival, initially scheduled to be held on 27 April 2017 as part of the 2017 RadioAsia Conference in Thailand, was cancelled.
