= Chandrasekara =

Chandrasekara is a surname. Notable people with the surname include:

- Pubudu Chandrasekara (born 1981), Sri Lankan cricketer
- Sydney Chandrasekara (1959–2020), Sri Lankan journalist
