= Ryan Henderlin =

Sri Lankan singer-songwriter

- Born: Ryan Jude Henderlin
- Origin: Colombo, Sri Lanka
- Genres: Sri Lankan music, Soul, Rhythm and Blues, Pop, Rock, Classical
- Occupations: Singer, Songwriter, Musician
- Instruments: Vocals, Guitar
- Years active: 2012 - present

Ryan Henderlin is a Sri Lankan singer-songwriter, performer, and creative artist known for his genre-blending musical style, charismatic stage presence, and energetic live performances. He rose to national prominence as the winner of YES Superstar Season 3, a reality TV English singing competition organized by YES FM and MTV in 2015. He performs professionally in both the English and Sinhala music industries and is the founder and lead vocalist of the funk/pop band Funk Island.

== YES Superstar Season 3 ==
Henderlin's audition was aired on the 2nd episode of the show on 11 May 2015, impressing the judges by singing Percy Sledge's - "When a man loves a woman" and moved on. Round 2 used backing tracks and continued with the live band "Rebels" from round 3 onward until the finale.

On 30 August 2015, Henderlin was announced winner of Season 3 of YES Superstar, with Vithma Kumarage becoming the 1st runner-up, Darren Stork being 2nd runner-up and Dinukshi Hettige being 3rd runner-up.

Stage	Song	Original artist	Date	Result
Round 1 - Audition	"When a Man Loves a Woman"	Percy Sledge	11 May 2015	Selected by Judges
Round 2 - Backing track	"Wicked Game"	Chris Isaac	18 May 2015	Selected by Judges
Round 3 - Live band	"You'll Never Find Another Love Like Mine"	Lou Rawls	31 May 2015	Selected by Judges
Round 4 - 80's 90's themed	"Eye of the Tiger"	Survivor	14 June 2015	Selected by Judges
Round 5 - Broadway themed	"Stars"	from Les Misérables	29 June 2015	Selected by Judges
Live Top 14 - MJ Themed	"Billie Jean"	Michael Jackson	12 July 2015	Selected by Judges
Live Top 8 - Semi Finals	"Forever"	Chris Brown	19 July 2015	Selected by votes
Live Top 8 - Result round	"I Can't Make You Love Me"	Bonnie Raitt	9 August 2015	Selected by votes
Live Finale	"Remember when it rained"	Josh Groban	30 August 2015	=== Winner ===
Live Finale	"It's a Man's World"	James Brown	30 August 2015	=== Winner ===
