= Nimal Lakshapathiarachchi =

Sri Lankan broadcaster (d. 2012)

Nimal Laksshapathiarachchi was a veteran broadcaster and pioneer of private broadcasting in Sri Lanka. He was the founder of Sirasa FM and Sirasa TV stations, which marked a turning point in Sri Lanka's radio and television industry. Lakshapathiarachchi played a significant role in revolutionizing radio broadcasting and popular culture in Sri Lanka, challenging the established norms and introducing innovative programming formats.

== Early life and career ==
Born in 1954, Nimal Lakshapathiarachchi began his radio career in the 1970s with Sri Lanka Broadcasting Corporation.

== Contribution to broadcasting ==
Lakshapathiarachchi's most notable contributions were the establishment of Sirasa FM in March 1994 and Sirasa TV in 1998. Sirasa FM quickly gained popularity, becoming the market leader within a year of its launch. The station introduced innovative practices such as presenting news in spoken Sinhala, providing a more friendly and accessible format compared to the traditional written form. Lakshapathiarachchi and his team also pioneered the concept of covering news every hour on the hour, setting a new standard for other channels to follow.

== Personal life and demise ==
Nimal Lakshapathiarachchi was the father of two children. His son Vishva later became a popular social media content creator. Lakshapathiarachchi died on July 19, 2012, in Colombo. He was 57 years old at the time of his death.
