= Sri Lanka Iconic Awards =

The Sri Lanka Iconic Awards is an annual event dedicated to celebrating the standout achievements of businesses and entrepreneurs across the island.

The ceremony's mission is to recognize innovation, economic impact, and leadership within Sri Lanka’s registered industries. The event presents awards across nearly 100 categories.

== The 2025 ceremony ==
The 2025 edition of the awards took place on August 22 at the Grand Monarch Hotel in Thalawathugoda. Several key figures and organizations that have made a significant mark on their respective fields were recognized.

Notable 2025 Award Winners:

- Sri Lanka’s Most Trusted Travel Agency: Travel Neth
- Best Entrepreneur of the Year: Thilina Hettiarachchi (Founder & Managing Director of Deep Tec Engineering Pvt Ltd)
- Digital Marketing Icon of the Year: Platform Daddy (Pvt) Ltd
- Most Popular TV Program: Paththare Wisthare (Hiru TV, featuring Chamuditha Samarawickrama)
- Best News Program: News First (Sirasa TV)
- Best Social Activist: Harini Wijethunga
- Best English Teacher: Sandeepa Basooriya
- Best CEO: Madhushan Edirisinghe
