= Alireza Yargholi =

Iranian physician and television health producer

- علیرضا یارقلی
- Alireza Yargholi
- Born: 13 September 1970 (age 56); Tehran, Iran
- Education: Medical degree, University of Kerman; PhD in Persian traditional medicine, Tehran University of Medical Sciences
- Occupations: Physician, television producer, presenter
- Years active: 1990s–present
- Known for: Medical adviser to the television program Tabib

Alireza Yargholi (Persian: علیرضا یارقلی; born September 13, 1970 (age 56) ) is an Iranian physician specializing in Persian traditional medicine and a television health producer and presenter. He is medical adviser to the IRIB TV3 program Tabib and a health adviser at the Information and Communication Technology Research Institute of Sharif University of Technology.

== Early life and education ==
Yargholi was born in Tehran. He attended the Alavi school, a religious school in Tehran, and entered university in 1988. He studied medicine and graduated from the medical school of the University of Kerman.

According to his own account, Yargholi was initially skeptical of traditional medicine as a medical student and wrote a short newspaper piece criticizing it. He changed his view after visiting an Iranian cupping research association, and has since used Persian medicine in his practice. In 2014 he entered a school of traditional medicine, and he later earned a PhD in Persian traditional medicine at Tehran University of Medical Sciences.

== Career ==
=== Journalism and academic advisory work ===
Yargholi began contributing health articles to newspapers in the 1990s. He has worked in audiovisual media since 2006 as a producer, presenter and guest expert on health programs, and in online media since the 2010s. He has said that he met Allameh Ali-Asghar Karbaschian in 1999, and credits him with encouraging him to continue in traditional medicine and to teach the public about health.

Since 2004 he has been a faculty member and health adviser at the Information and Communication Technology Research Institute of Sharif University of Technology.

=== Television ===
Yargholi first reached a wide audience through the program Tabib in 2016. Tabib is a health program on IRIB TV3 , hosted by Peyman Talebi, which covers nutrition, exercise and disease prevention. According to its director at the time of its launch, it aimed to combine traditional medicine with findings of modern medicine, and Yargholi was named its medical adviser. Hamshahri Online describes him as head of the program's team of physicians since 2016. He has also produced the program Sartoon Salamat.

He later produced the Ramadan program Sofreh-ha-ye Aseman for state television, which featured traditional medicine physicians. In April 2022 he was announced as a guest on the IRIB TV2 talk show Rokh be Rokh, where he was to discuss healthy fasting during Ramadan.

=== Media commentary ===
Between 2022 and 2026, Iranian news outlets including the Islamic Republic News Agency (IRNA), the Mehr News Agency, the Iranian Quran News Agency (IQNA) and Borna News have interviewed or quoted him as a specialist in Persian medicine.

In 2026 he said that people without medical qualifications who promote treatments on social media could endanger public health, and called for both restrictions on unlicensed advertising and more scientific health content in the media.

== Works ==
- Jalili, Mohsen; Yargholi, Alireza, eds. (2024). Musiqi-darmani va ekhtelalat-e khab موسیقی درمانی و اختلالات خواب [Music Therapy and Sleep Disorders]. Note-ha-ye Zendegi (in Persian). Vol. 2. Tehran: Nabat. ISBN 9786225612020.
