= ABU Radio Song Festival 2016 =

Date and venue
- Final: 26 April 2016
- Venue: China National Radio Auditorium, Beijing, China

Organisation
- Host broadcaster: China National Radio (CNR)

Participants
- Number of entries: 13 songs from 10 countries
- Debuting countries: China; Macau; Nepal; Romania; Turkmenistan
- Non-returning countries: Brunei
- Participation map: Participating countries Did not qualify to the final Countries that participated in the past but not in 2016

The ABU Radio Song Festival 2016 was the fourth edition of the ABU Radio Song Festivals, organised by the Asia-Pacific Broadcasting Union (ABU). Originally a biennial event, the festival organisers changed its format to an annual festival commencing from 2014. The festival took place on 26 April 2016 in Beijing, China. Thirteen songs from ten countries took part in the festival. The hosts China, along with Macau, Nepal, Romania, and Turkmenistan all made their début in the festival. Brunei had withdrawn from the festival stating that they had not received an invitation to participate from the broadcasting union. Indonesia failed to qualify from the pre-selection stage of the festival.

== Location ==
It was announced that the 2016 ABU Radio Song Festival would take place in Beijing, China.

== Format ==
Unlike the format used in the Eurovision Song Contest there are two versions of the Song Festivals, ABU Radio and ABU TV Song Festivals. The ABU Radio Song Festival took place alongside the Radio Asia 2016 event took place in April 2016.

=== Host broadcaster ===
China National Radio (CNR), was the host broadcaster for the festival on 26 April 2016.

== Participating Countries ==
A total of thirteen countries took part in this years festival. Host country China made their début in this years festival along with Macau, Nepal, Romania and Turkmenistan. Brunei withdrew from the contest. The following entries had been selected by the ABU to participate in the final of the ABU Radio Song Festival 2016.

Country	Artist	Song	Language
China	Wang Yi, Zhang Yingying, Ren Yanmin, Zhenmin, Hua Shukai	"Youth Never Ends"	Mandarin
China	China Broadcasting Children's Chorus	"Singing in the Drizzling Rain"	Mandarin
India	Thokchom Lansana Chanu	"Creation"	English
South Korea	Seungjin Han	"Little Wings"	English
Macau	Josie Ho	"Who Am I"	Cantonese
Maldives	Bathool Ahmed	"Unikan"	Maldivian
Myanmar	Eastern & Phoe Pyae	"New Fangled Harmony"	English
Nepal	Suman Gurung	"Aaja Mero Man Ma"	Nepali
Romania	Analia Victoria Selis & Mariano Castro	"Viento Del Sur"	Spanish
Singapore	Ling Kai	"Year, Month, Day"	Mandarin
Thailand	Nawapol Roadsomjit (Ome)	"Take On This World"	English
Turkmenistan	Atajan Berdiyev	"Folk song"	Turkmen
Vietnam	Phan Thi Thu Lan	"Good news bring by the bird"	Vietnamese

=== Did not qualify ===
Of the seventeen preliminary entries, thirteen were selected to proceed to the final of the ABU Radio Song Festival. The remaining four songs did not qualify (as shown in the following table)

Country	Artist	Song	Language
India	Vince Costa	"Home Before Christmas"	English
Indonesia	Debora Febricia Romauli	"Mati Rasa"	Indonesian
Indonesia	Novri Batteny	"Di Antara Kita"	Indonesian
Maldives	Abdulla Ziyau	"Eid Ufaa"	Maldivian

== Other countries ==
- Brunei - Radio Televisyen Brunei (RTB) announced on 20 February 2016 that they had not been invited to the festival, making their participation unlikely.
