= ABU Radio Song Festival 2014 =

Festival held in Sri Lanka

Date and venue
- Final: 23 May 2014
- Venue: Stein Studios, Colombo, Sri Lanka

Organisation
- Executive supervisor: Vijay Sadhu
- Host broadcaster: Sri Lanka Broadcasting Corporation (SLBC)

Participants
- Number of entries: 12
- Debuting countries: Sri Lanka; Thailand
- Returning countries: None
- Non-returning countries: Bhutan; Fiji; Indonesia; Kyrgyzstan; Sudan; Vanuatu; Vietnam
- Participation map: Participating countries Countries that participated in the past but not in 2014

Vote
- Voting system: Each performer received a 'Token of Appreciation' from the festival organiser's.

The ABU Radio Song Festival 2014 was the second edition of the biennial ABU Radio Song Festivals, organised by the Asia-Pacific Broadcasting Union (ABU). The festival took place on 23 May 2014 in the Sri Lankan city of Colombo. The Nelum Pokuna Mahinda Rajapaksa Theatre was originally chosen as the host venue, but was later moved to the Stein Studios. Twelve countries participated the song festival. The festival was to be originally hosted by ABC Australia however for unknown reasons this did not occur.

== Location ==
Location of the host city in Sri Lanka.

Colombo is the largest city and the commercial, industrial and cultural capital of Sri Lanka. It is located on the west coast of the island and adjacent to Sri Jayawardenapura Kotte suburb or the parliament capital of Sri Lanka. Colombo is also the administrative capital of Western Province, Sri Lanka and the district capital of Colombo District. Colombo is often referred to as the capital since Sri Jayawardenapura Kotte is a satellite city of Colombo. Colombo is a busy and vibrant place with a mixture of modern life and colonial buildings and ruins with a population of about 752,993 in the city limits. It was the political capital of Sri Lanka, before Sri Jayawardenapura Kotte.

The original venue selected to host the festival was the Nelum Pokuna Mahinda Rajapaksa Theatre, in Colombo. The theatre is equipped with ultra modern facilities such as an auditorium with 1,288 seats, a library, and training facilities.

On 21 March 2014, ABU announced Stein Studios would be the new venue for this year's edition. Its Founders Block studio is over 15,600sq ft (1500 sq m) in area and can turn into a 2000-seat theater.

== Format ==
Unlike the format used in the Eurovision Song Contest there are two versions of the Song Festivals, ABU Radio and ABU TV Song Festivals. The ABU Radio Song Festival which took place on 23 May 2014 coincided with the Radio Asia 2014 event that took place between 22 and 24 May 2014.

== Participating countries ==
A total of 12 countries took part in this years festival. Host country Sri Lanka, who withdrew prior to the inaugural 2012 festival, and Thailand made their debut at the radio song festival whilst Bhutan, Fiji, Indonesia, Kyrgyzstan, Sudan, Vanuatu and Vietnam withdrew from the radio festival this year.

Unlike the 2012 festival, this year's festival had no awards presented to the top five acts. The festival organiser's presented 'Tokens of Appreciation' to the performers as a sign of recognition of the diverse range of musical genre.

=== Order of performance ===
Draw	Country	Artist	Song	Language
01	Malaysia	Mohd Rizal Ahmad	"Di Sudut Kamar Hatiku"	Malay
02	Pakistan	Marryum Hussain	"The Soft Song of Peace"	Urdu
03	Iran	Moghtada Gharbavi	"Bezar Asheget Bemoonam"	Persian
04	Thailand	PRD Band	"Kwam Smakki"	Thai
05	Brunei	Neff Aslee	"Juliet"	English
06	Singapore	Nur Hasanah Zakaria	"Boneka Ku Hilang"	Malay
07	India	Mangka Mayanglambam	"Tamla Loibi Napom"	Meithei
08	Iran	Peyman Talebi	"Wave of the Infinity"	English
09	Australia	Iluka	"12 July"	English
10	Sri Lanka	Shehara Liyanage	"Something Bout' You & I"	English
11	South Korea	Seokwan Ryu	"A Regular"	Korean
12	Sri Lanka	Super Stars	"Boot Song"	English

=== Did not qualify ===
Of the sixteen preliminary entries, twelve were selected to proceed to the final of the ABU Radio Song Festival. The remaining four did not qualify (as shown in the following table)

Country	Artist	Song	Language
Brunei	Rapul Rezal	"Inilah Sebenarnya"	Malay
India	Abhijith Kishan	"Be the Change"	English
Iran	Heshmatollah Rajabzadeh	"Larzan"	Luri
Iran	Mohammad Saveh	"Fountain of the Sun"	Persian

== Other countries ==
- Bhutan – On 30 December 2013, the station manager of Centennial Radio confirmed to Eurovoix.com that they would not be taking part in the 2014 edition of ABU Radio Song Festival.
