= Anjaney Katirkama =

Sri Lankan model (born 1991)

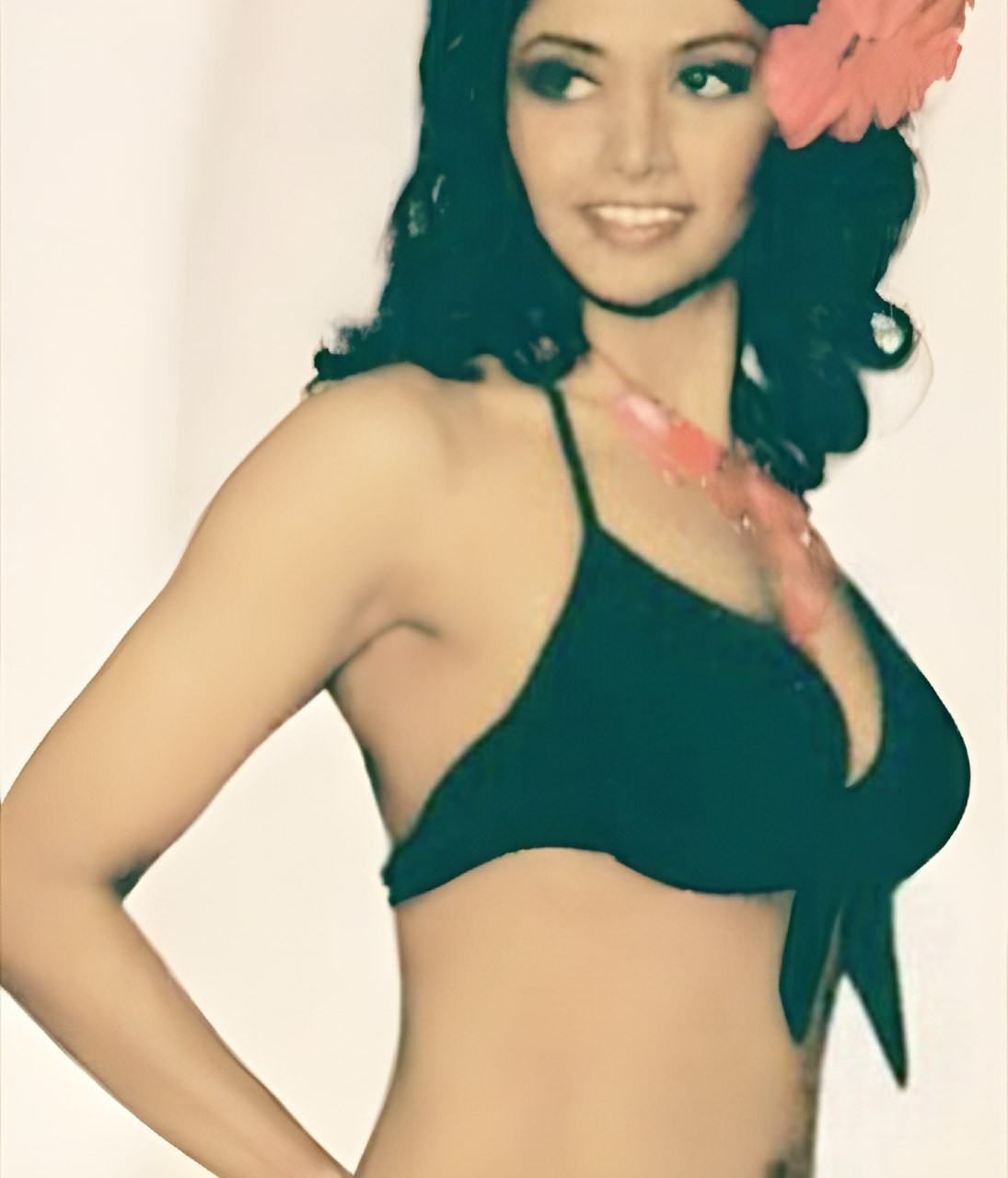
- Katirkama in a fashion show
- Born: January 28, 1991 (age 34)
- Occupation: model

Anjaney Katirkama (born 28 January 1991) is a model and beauty queen based in Sri Lanka and India.

== Modeling career ==
Anjaney started modeling in India.

In 2006 she was selected for Miss Sri Lanka Universe and also became a finalist in the contest. Following that, she won the crown of Puthaandu Paenn (lady of the New Year) contest in the same year.

She has done commercials for Huawei, Havelock City, Shakthi FM, 7 Up, Von Dutch, Prima Noodles, Seylan Bank, Surf Excel, Hatton National Bank, Shiga Center (Japan), Smirnoff, Coca-Cola, Fair & Lovely amongst others. She has been a fashion model for many shows in Asia.
