= Shameer Rasooldeen =

Sri Lankan business person, journalist and news anchor

Shameer Rasooldeen ෂමීර් රසූල්ඩීන්
- Born: Shameer Rasooldeen; October 17, 1985 (age 40); Colombo, Sri Lanka
- Education: D.S. Senanayake College
- Alma mater: St Cross College, Oxford; Cardiff Metropolitan University
- Occupations: Business Person; Journalist; News Anchor
- Years active: 2003–present
- Awards: Best Executive Officer 2018/19

Shameer Rasooldeen (born 17 October 1985: Sinhala: ෂමීර් රසූල්ඩීන්), is a Sri Lankan business person, journalist and a television news anchor. Shameer is the current host of Sri Lanka's only English Language current affairs program Face the Nation telecast on TV1. He currently holds the position of Group Director at the Capital Maharaja Organisation and currently heads the export arm of the Group, AF Jones Exporters Ceylon Private Limited. He is currently the youngest sitting member of the Capital Maharaja Organisation’s Board of Directors and the first appointment of Sashi Rajamahendran, after he took up the post of Chairman/Managing Director of Capital Maharaja. He has won two international awards and filed over 50 stories for CNN and Channel News Asia. Shameer is a CNN Fellow, Chevening fellow at St. Cross College University of Oxford and also a Dag Hammersjkold fellow.

== Personal life ==
He was born on 17 October 1985 in Colombo, Sri Lanka. His father Mohamed Casim Rasooldeen, is editor-in-chief of Colombo times newspaper. His mother late Siththy Harisha Rasooldeen was a teacher by profession. He has one sister, Shaheera Rozmin, and a twin brother Shaheer. He completed his primary education at D.S. Senanayake College.

== Career ==
In 2012, he completed the Professional Qualification in Human Resource Management at the Institute of Personnel Management Sri Lanka. In 2017, he completed his master's degree in business at Cardiff Metropolitan University.

In 2019, he was selected as a Chevening fellow (a CRISP fellow) as part of the Chevening Science, Research and Leadership program at the St. Cross College, University of Oxford funded by the Foreign and Commonwealth office in London. In addition to that, he is also a CNN Fellow, 2007 and was awarded the Dag Hammarskjöld Journalism Fellowships in 2012. He has filed a record 51 stories from the United Nations General Assembly during his fellowship from the United Nations in a span of 2 months.

He joined Capital Maharaja Organization in 2004 as a news reporter. He attributes his success to his mentor Mr. R. Rajamahendran, the Chairman of the Capital Maharaja Group. In 2007, a story produced by Shameer won the best Feature Report of the year award at the CNN World Report Awards. His story was titled "Coexistence of children of different ethnicity in Sri Lanka", was aired on CNN World Report. In 2008, he became the Assistant news manager of MTV Channel. From 2010 to 2012, Shameer was the News Manager at the English desk of News First. In 2012, at the age of 26, he became the youngest News Director of English News at News First. He also won the silver medal at the United Nations Correspondents Association Awards (UNCA Awards) for a news documentary series telecast on News First, based on International Water Day. During the same time, he initiated Sri Lanka's first-ever volunteer Awards “V Awards” together with the United Nations Volunteer Organization in 2012. In a career spanning more than 18 years as a journalist, he has conducted over 10,000 interviews including that of United Nations Secretary-General Ban Ki-Moon.

In 2014 under the leadership of Shameer, News First introduced 'News 1st UReport', a platform for every Sri Lankan to report news with the use of their mobile phones. Currently, there are over 50,000 UReporters island-wide. In the meantime, under the supervision of Mr. R. Rajamahendran, Shameer acts as the mentor in the News First 'Gammadda program', which primarily focused on the development of rural areas of Sri Lanka. Shameer was also instrumental in handing over the Gammadda publications to the University of Oxford Library. In 2014 he was awarded the Most Outstanding Young Person of the Year (TOYP) award by Junior Chamber International. Since 2015, Shameer hosts the news program "Face the Nation", a weekly current affairs talk show in Sri Lanka.

In 2016, he was promoted as CEO to head the tea operations of AF Jones Exporters Ceylon Private Limited, a subsidiary of the Capital Maharaja Organization, and became the youngest CEO at the age of 31. Under his leadership and guidance, the company has become one of the fastest-growing companies of the Capital Maharaja Group. In 2017, Shameer was also selected by the Asia Foundation to its Asia 21 list of young leaders and attended the fellowship in Melbourne, Australia. In 2019, he was awarded The Maharaja Gold Medal for Business Achievements at the 42nd Annual Progress Review Ceremony of Capital Maharaja Organization Limited.

On 17 August 2023, Rasooldeen was appointed to the main board of the Capital Maharaja Organization. becoming the youngest sitting member of the Capital Maharaja Organization's Board of Directors and the first appointment of Sashi Rajamahendran, after he took up the post of managing director of Capital Maharaja Group. He currently holds the position of group director at the Capital Maharaja Organization and heads the export arm of the Group, AF Jones Exporters Ceylon (pvt) Ltd.

== Awards and accolades ==
- Silver Medal at the United Nations Correspondents Association Awards (UNCA Awards) - 2013
