= ABU Radio Song Festival 2015 =

Song festival in Myanmar

Date and venue
- Final: 29 May 2015
- Venue: National Theatre of Yangon, Yangon, Myanmar

Organisation
- Host broadcaster: Myanmar Radio and Television (MRTV)

Participants
- Number of entries: 10 songs from 9 countries
- Debuting countries: Myanmar; Maldives
- Returning countries: Indonesia; Vietnam
- Non-returning countries: Australia; Iran; Malaysia; Pakistan; Sri Lanka
- Participation map: Participating countries Countries that participated in the past but not in 2015

The ABU Radio Song Festival 2015 was the third edition of the ABU Radio Song Festivals, organised by the Asia-Pacific Broadcasting Union (ABU). Originally a biennial event, the festival organisers changed its format to an annual festival commencing from 2014. The festival took place on 29 May 2015 in the city of Yangon, Myanmar. Seventeen songs had been submitted to the event organisers, of which only ten songs from nine countries, were selected to perform at the event. The hosts Myanmar made their début in the festival.

== Location ==
It was announced that the 2015 ABU Radio Song Festival will take place in Yangon, Myanmar.

== Format ==
Unlike the format used in the Eurovision Song Contest there are two versions of the Song Festivals, ABU Radio and ABU TV Song Festivals. The ABU Radio Song Festival which will take place on 29 May 2015 coincides with the Radio Asia 2015 event that took place between 28 and 30 May 2015.

=== Host broadcaster ===
Myanmar Radio and Television (MRTV), will be the host broadcaster for the festival on 29 May 2015.

=== Interval act ===
The interval acted featured Rosanita Niken, Billy Talahatu and Stella, performing the song "Pusaka".

== Participating countries ==
A total of seventeen countries took part in this years festival. Host country Myanmar made its début in the 2015, festival along with the Maldives and Palestine. Vietnam and Indonesia also returned to the contest after not participating in 2014. However Australia and Iran both withdrew from the contest.

The following entries had been selected by the ABU to participate in the final of the ABU Radio Song Festival 2015.

Draw	Country	Artist	Song	Language
1	Myanmar	Jewel & Eastern	"Mingalar Bar"	Burmese
2	Brunei	Dila	"Aku Milik Orang"	Malay
3	India	Peepal Tree	"Nayi Khushi"	Hindi
4	Indonesia	Billy Talahatu	"Harmonize of the Soul"	Indonesian, English
5	South Korea	Jaewon Jung	"View"	Korean
6	Maldives	Moosa Mausoof	"Farima"	Maldivian
7	Singapore	Sufie Rashid	"Tiada Pengganti"	Malay
8	Myanmar	Min Theik Di, Ko Linn & May Ingyin Thaw	"Peaceful Earth"	Burmese
9	Thailand	Jack's Fruit Band	"Ban Khong Rao"	Thai
10	Vietnam	Dinh Thi Thanh Le	"Nguyen Tai Tue"	Vietnamese

=== Did not qualify ===
Of the seventeen preliminary entries, ten were selected to proceed to the final of the ABU Radio Song Festival. The remaining three did not qualify (as shown in the following table)

Country	Artist	Song	Language
India	Padavi Deshmukh	"Voice of Women"	English
Indonesia	Sisca Christin Dama	"Selangkah Lebih Dekat"	Indonesian
Maldives	Zing Band	"Khiyaar"	Maldivian

=== Withdrawn ===
The following four countries withdrew their entries to the contest for a variety of reasons.

Country	Artist	Song	Language
Malaysia	Rasyidah Abd Rahim	"Selingkuh Kasih"	Malay
Pakistan	Shakeel Mahota	"Pakistan Tu Meri Jaan Hai"	Urdu
Palestine	Dalal Abu Amned	"Baladi"	Arabic
Sri Lanka	Shadir Ahmed and Wishmi Tharusha Hettiarachchi	"Celebrate Us (Children)"	English

== Other countries ==
- Vanuatu and Australia- Radio Australia who participated in the 2012 contest as part of Vanuatu confirmed on 13 March they would not be taking part. However, Commercial Radio Australia, who represented Australia in the ABU Radio Song Festivals have yet to announce their participation plans.

== International broadcasts ==
Each participating country was invited to broadcast the event across their respective networks and provide commentary in the native languages to add insight and description to the shows.

- Brunei – Radio Televisyen Brunei (RTB)
- Indonesia – Radio Republik Indonesia (RRI)
- Myanmar – Myanmar Radio and Television (MRTV)
