= Sydney Chandrasekara =

Sri Lankan journalist and media personality (1959-2020)

Sydney Chandrasekara සිඩ්නි චන්ද්‍රසේකර
- Born: 15 January 1959; Colombo, Sri Lanka
- Died: 14 November 2020 (aged 61); Colombo, Sri Lanka
- Education: Ananda College
- Occupations: Journalist, lyricist, director, media personality
- Years active: 1980–2020

Sydney Chandrasekara (Sinhala: සිඩ්නි චන්ද්‍රසේකර; 15 January 1959 – 14 November 2020) was a Sri Lankan journalist, lyricist, director and a prominent media personality. One of the iconic figures of Sri Lankan media, Chandrasekara contributed to several television programs over a career spanning more than four decades.

== Personal life ==
He was born on 15 January 1959 in Colombo, Sri Lanka. He was educated at Ananda College, Colombo.

Chandrasekara died in hospital on 14 November 2020, at the age of 61, following a brief illness.

== Career ==
He is a senior journalist as well as a television program producer and lyricist who worked extensively in Sri Lankan media. After school he joins Sri Lanka Rupavahini Corporation (SLRC), had the privilege of being mentored by the pioneer of Sri Lankan dubbing, Titus Thotawatte. Then collaborated with Thotawatte, he involved in dubbing programs such as Malgudi Dawasa, Rasara and later on Athru Pelassa, Sri Lanka's first live puppet program. Later he was appointed as a producer in the drama section of the Rupavahini Corporation. Then in 1992, he became the director of the television serial Nidikumba, first teledrama in the Sri Lanka to be created using multiple cameras in a studio. Ninety per cent of the drama was shot inside SLRC, becoming the first ever studio production of a teledrama at that time. In the drama, popular musician Clarence Wijewardena sung the song "Aetha Epita Hima Kanden", which became a milestone in Sinhala teledrama history. The drama still holds a record for its earnings for SLRC including limited number of episodes, maximum spectator response and attraction.

After the success of Nidikumba, he made several popular television serials including: Kumarayaneni, Piyabana Assaya, Samudra Chaya and Pembarayaneni. After resigning from Rupavahini, he joined with Swarnavahini where he served as the Deputy Program Director and First Director of News at Live at 8 News Division. During his period, he made the morning show Swarnodaya and then became the concept creator for Live @ 8 news section. Later, he joined Sirasa TV for News First as a consultant. In 2005, after Tsunami disaster, he composed the song We Shall Rebuild which was later sung by Bathiya and Santhush and Ashanthi De Alwis. He also directed the serial A-9 Mei Paaren Enna telecast on Sirasa TV. During this period, he brought the concept of the popular program Dawasa among the audience. Then he made the television political comedy Good Bad Ugly which revealed the hidden reality of Sri Lankan politics. He made several contributions towards News First Gammadda program.

He created several teledramas and was a prolific lyricist. His song As Deka Piyana Nidaganna is a very famous song sung by Rookantha Gunathilaka. The song became a sensation in Sri Lanka, when Shihan Mihiranga sang it in the reality competition Sirasa Superstar. Then he composed the popular songs: Mamai Obe Chanchala, Api Wenwena Tharamata and Sanda Hiru Tharaka. Meanwhile, he also wrote theme songs for dubbed teledramas such as Me Adarayay, Prema Dadayama, Digvijaya and Ananthen Aa Tharu Kumara. Apart from them, he also created the song Mage Mawbimai for the Commonwealth Heads of Government Meeting (CHOGM) in Sri Lanka. The Vanitha Bhimana theme song launched by News First to empower the courageous women of Sri Lanka was also composed by Chandrasekara. Recently in 2020, he also wrote the theme song Nagitimu Sri Lanka which was released for COVID-19 pandemic for public awareness.

He was an advisor to Newsfirst section of Sirasa TV during his demise. His hosted the program Sundara Birinda, which interviewed the wives of veteran artists, was also very popular on TV One. In 2017, he directed his maiden short film Cobbler's Dream.

== Filmography ==
Year	Film	Role	Ref.
2018	Udumbara	Sound combination, lyricist	
