= Sirasa Catchpoint =

2025 Sri Lankan television series

- Genre: High-energy quiz show
- Directed by: Samith Rangika Basnayaka
- Presented by: Yash Weerasinghe
- Country of origin: Sri Lanka
- Original language: Sinhala
- No. of series: 1

Production
- Running time: Approx. 45 minutes
- Production company: Sirasa TV

Original release
- Network: Sirasa TV
- Release: 12 July 2025 – present

Sirasa Catchpoint is a Sri Lankan physical quiz game show hosted by actor Yash Weerasinghe and broadcast on Sirasa TV. The series premiered on 12 July 2025 as the first Asian adaptation of the British game show Catchpoint, originally produced for BBC One. Produced locally under license from ITV Studios, the show combines traditional general knowledge trivia with physical agility, requiring pairs of contestants to answer questions correctly to catch falling balls and win cash prizes.

== Format ==
=== Gameplay concept ===
Unlike traditional quiz shows that rely solely on trivia knowledge, Sirasa Catchpoint combines general knowledge with physical agility. Two teams of two compete by answering questions while positioning themselves in front of ten large LED screens mounted on the studio wall.

- The setup: Each LED screen displays a potential answer to a multiple-choice question.
- The drop: Once an answer is locked in (or the timer expires), a ball drops from a trapdoor situated directly above the correct screen.
- The goal: Contestants must catch the falling ball. If a player is standing in front of the correct screen, the ball drops directly into their hands; if they selected the wrong screen, they must sprint across the stage to attempt to catch it before it hits the ground.

=== Round-by-round format ===
Each episode typically consists of four main rounds with escalating stakes and physical difficulty.

Round	Name	Format
Round 1	Solo Catch	Individual players take turns selecting from ten options. A pink ball drops above the correct answer; catching a blue ball (incorrect) yields fewer points.
Round 2	Double Catch	Both team members work together to catch smaller, faster balls with fewer options, requiring increased coordination.
Round 3	Quick Catch	A 45-second blitz round where teams answer as many rapid-fire questions as possible, adding cash to their prize pot for every successful catch.
Round 4	The Final	The team with the highest point total advances to the final round. They face two final questions, where answering both correctly doubles their accumulated winnings, while failing both results in forfeiting their prize.

== Production ==
Sirasa Catchpoint is filmed at the Stein Studios complex in Ratmalana. The production features a custom-built, high-tech game stage whose layout and visual design closely mirror those of the original British series.
