= Abdel Gadir Salim =

Sudanese popular musician (1946–2025)

- Born: 1946; Dilling, Kordofan, Anglo-Egyptian Sudan
- Died: 16 December 2025 (aged 79)
- Genres: Music of Sudan, Arabic pop music
- Occupations: Singer, bandleader
- Instruments: Oud, vocals
- Years active: 1970s–2025
- Labels: Globe Style, World Circuit

Abdel Gadir Salim (Arabic: عبد القادر سالم, 1946 – 16 December 2025) was a Sudanese singer and bandleader of popular music from Sudan. He was one of the most well-known Sudanese singers in the West and performed around the world and recorded in countries such as the United Kingdom and France.

== Background ==
Salim was born in the village of Dilling, Kordofan province, amidst the Nuba Mountains in the West of Sudan in 1946. He trained in both European and Arabic music at the Institute of Drama and Music in Khartoum, beginning with Oud at the behest of a friend. By 1971, he changed from composing urban-styled music to folkloristic rural tunes. Seeking out traditional and colloquial songs to perform, he began in his native Kordofan and in Darfur. Rarely writing his own lyrics, his songs range from politically aware, educational arguments to love ballads. Salim is noted for maintaining a neutral repertoire that has kept him from irritating the government of the day.

Referring to discrimination of music in Sudan, the music critic Angel Romero wrote: "In 1994, Salim was a victim in a knife attack in Omdurman, which took the life of famed singer Khogali Osman. The assault reflected the fiercely anti-cultural environment that followed the 1989 coup, but Salim, always a figure above politics, dismissed it as the act of a crazy man, and carried right on with his work."

Salim died on 16 December 2025, at the age of 79.

== Musical style ==
In his early work, Salim was seen as a representative of a musical style known as the “Khartoum city song”, popular urban music. It is a mixture of popular Sudanese music styles with new musical elements, such as some influences from jazz. The addition of Western musical instruments such as the electric guitar, accordion or saxophone in his band's lineup is characteristic of the urban popular style of the time.

Many of Salim's rhythms come from traditional music, such as wedding dances that are often in strident 6/8 beats. Some of the beats, from desert areas, are modelled after the gait of camels. His sonorous voice comes often in a long, steady croon.

== Career ==
Salim shared duties in his careers as international performer and as headmaster of a school in Chad between at least the mid-1980s and the mid-2000s. According to a statement on the back of his album Nujum Al-Lail (Stars in the Night) (1989, Globe Style, UK), the two careers harmonize without strain. In 2005, he recorded a collaborational album called Ceasefire with Sudanese rapper, former child soldier and Christian convert Emmanuel Jal.

Salim represented Sudan at the qualification round of the first ABU Radio Song Festival 2012, but failed to qualify for the final which was scheduled to take place at the KBS Concert Hall in Seoul, South Korea on 14 October 2012.

== Discography ==
- Abdel Gadir Salim on discogs
- Sounds of Sudan Vol.1, Songs from Kordofan, World Circuit 1987
- Nujum al-Lail, Stars of the night, Globe Style 1989
- The Merdoum Kings Play Songs of Love, World Circuit 1991
- Le blues de Khartoum, Harmonia mundi 1999
- Ceasefire (with Emmanuel Jal), Riverboat Records 2005

Awards and achievements
Preceded by None	Sudan in the ABU Radio Song Festival; 2012 with "Bessama"	Succeeded by
