= Catchpoint =

British game show (2019–2022)

- Genre: Game show
- Presented by: Paddy McGuinness
- Theme music composer: Elba Studios
- Country of origin: United Kingdom
- Original language: English
- No. of series: 4
- No. of episodes: 31

Production
- Running time: 45 minutes
- Production companies: Possessed and 12 Yard

Original release
- Network: BBC One
- Release: 23 March 2019 – 25 June 2022

Catchpoint was a British game show that aired on BBC One from 23 March 2019 to 25 June 2022. Hosted by Paddy McGuinness, the show combined general knowledge questions with physical challenges, offering a unique twist on traditional quiz formats.

== Format ==
The game was set in a studio featuring ten large LED screens arranged along the back wall, each displaying potential answers to questions. Suspended above these screens were trapdoors containing balls. When a contestant selected an answer, the corresponding trapdoor would open, releasing a ball. To win money, contestants had to catch the ball that fell from the correct answer's trapdoor.

The game featured multiple rounds:

- Solo Catch (First Catch in Series 1): Teams answered two questions, with balls dropping for each. In series 1, The first question used a smaller ball worth £250, and the second used a larger ball worth £500, from series 2 onwards this was reduced to £100 for the first question and £200 for the second question
- Double Catch (Decoy Catch in Series 1): Balls dropped from every answer screen, but only the pink balls were correct. Teams aimed to catch these while avoiding the blue ones. In series 1, the first question was worth worth £750, and the second was worth £1,000. From series 2, there are two questions on each side (Pink and Blue) the two balls from the first question are each worth £300 each, and the ones from the second question are worth £400 each.
- Quick Catch: A rapid-fire round lasting 45 seconds, where each correct answer resulted in £300 for the team. From series 2 onwards, the first correct answer awarded £100 and increased by that value for each subsequent correct answer
- Final Catch: The concluding round where the winning team selected the correct answer by eliminating others, aiming for a £10,000 prize in series 1, or anything they banked so far, with the possibility double it from series 2 onwards.

== Transmissions ==
Series	Start date	End date	Episodes
1	23 March 2019	11 May 2019	6
SR	29 February 2020	7 March 2020	2
2	14 March 2020	25 April 2020	6
CS1	16 January 2021	20 February 2020	4
3	6 March 2021	3 April 2021	5
CS2	23 April 2022	25 June 2022	8

== International versions ==
Country	Local title	Host	Network	Premiere date
Sri Lanka	Sirasa Catchpoint	Yash Weerasinghe	Sirasa TV	12 July 2025
