= ABU Radio Song Festival 2018 =

Date and venue
- Final: 11 July 2018
- Venue: Kazmedia center, Astana, Kazakhstan

Organisation
- Host broadcaster: Republican Television and Radio Corporation (RTRC)

Participants
- Number of entries: 11 songs from 10 countries (to date)
- Debuting countries: Afghanistan; Kazakhstan; Turkey; Turkmenistan
- Returning countries: Indonesia
- Non-returning countries: (China); Myanmar; Romania (Singapore) (South Korea); Thailand

The ABU Radio Song Festival 2018 was the fifth edition of the ABU Radio Song Festivals, organised by the Asia-Pacific Broadcasting Union (ABU). It was held in the capital of Kazakhstan, Astana in July 2018 in the Kazmedia center.

== List of participating countries ==
Country	Artist	Song	Language	Broadcaster
Afghanistan	Goodar Zazai	"I Don't Want to Grow Up"	Persian	RTA
India	Akashlina Amin	"Jhumur"	Hindi	AIR
India	Siddhartha BelMannu	"Anireekshita"	Hindi	AIR
Indonesia	Andi Rikzha Fadillah Mallarangeng	"You are the shade"	English, Indonesian	RRI
Kazakhstan	Jordan Arakelyan	"No way back"	English	RTRC
Macau	Ao Ieong Sio Wa	"Party Love"	English	TDM
Maldives	Abdulla Ziyau	"Kuriah Dhanee gadha hiyvarun"	Maldivian	PSM
Nepal	Biju Pandit	"Gorkhali Cheli"	Nepali	Radio Tulsipur
Turkey	Yahya Geylan	"Masum Bebek"	Turkish	TRT
Turkmenistan	Atajanov Ahmet	"Pyrakyndan"	Turkmen	TVTM
Vietnam	Nguyen Hoang Tung	"Osole Mio"	Vietnamese	VOV
