= Elephant House =

Elephant House may refer to:

== Places ==
- The Elephant House, a residential dwelling in Toronto, Canada with an elephant statue
- Edward Gorey House, also known as Elephant House, the residence of American writer, Edward Gorey
- Lucy the Elephant, a house in the shape of an elephant located in Atlantic County, New Jersey
- The Elephant House, a café in Edinburgh, Scotland where J. K. Rowling wrote part of the Harry Potter novels

== Businesses ==
- Ceylon Cold Stores, trading as Elephant House, a brand name for a range of carbonated drinks in Sri Lanka.
