= ABU Radio Song Festival 2012 =

First edition of song contest organised by the Asian-Pacific Broadcasting Union

- Beyond the Wave!
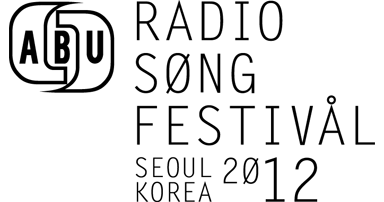

Date and venue
- Final: 11 October 2012
- Venue: KBS Hall, Seoul, South Korea

Organisation
- Executive supervisor: Vijay Sadhu
- Host broadcaster: Korean Broadcasting System (KBS)
- Presenters: Han Seok Joon; Ailee

Participants
- Number of entries: 13
- Debuting countries: Australia; Bhutan; Brunei; Fiji (withdrew); Indonesia; Iran; Kyrgyzstan; Malaysia; Pakistan; Singapore; South Korea; Sri Lanka (withdrew); Sudan; Vanuatu; Vietnam
- Participation map: Participating countries Did not qualify to the final

Vote
- Voting system: International jury cast votes and award prizes to the top five.: 1st: Grand Prix Award; 2nd: Gold Award; 3rd: Silver Award; 4th: Bronze Award; 5th: Special Jury Award
- Winning song: South Korea "For a Rest"

The ABU Radio Song Festival 2012 was the first edition of the biennial ABU Radio Song Festivals, organised by the Asia-Pacific Broadcasting Union (ABU). The festival took place in the KBS Hall, which is located in the South Korean capital of Seoul and coincided with the 49th general assembly of the ABU. The ABU Radio Song Festival attracted twenty-six original entries representing eighteen radio broadcasters from fifteen countries, which competed in a preliminary jury round. The juries selected thirteen entries from twelve radio broadcasters in ten countries to qualify for the final show which was held on 11 October 2012. Fifteen entries were originally selected to participate in the grand final. However, Fiji and Sri Lanka withdrew from the radio competition prior to the final show, and thus only thirteen entries participated in the competition on 11 October 2012.

South Korea won the Grand Prix award with the song "For a Rest" performed by boy band Billy Acoustie. Danielle Blakey representing Australia won the gold award with the song "Fearless", Brunei received the silver award with the song "Yang Terindah (So Beautiful)" performed by Maria Aires, with Sammy Ray Jones also representing Australia receiving the bronze award with his song "Rinet". K-Town Clan representing Malaysia received the special jury award with their song "Party Animal". The next edition was held in Colombo, Sri Lanka.

== History ==
The Asia-Pacific Broadcasting Union (ABU) had already run an international song contest for its members inspired by the Eurovision Song Contest in 1985–1987, called the ABU Popular Song Contest, with 14 countries from the Asia-Pacific region competing. The show had a similar concept to the current festivals with the winners being chosen by a professional jury. South Korea, New Zealand and Australia celebrated victories in that competition. In 1989–1991 the ABU co-produced the ABU Golden Kite World Song Festival in Malaysia with participation of Asia-Pacific countries, as well as Yugoslavia and Finland.

In 2008, the European Broadcasting Union (EBU) proposed a partnership with the ABU on the establishment of an Asiavision Song Contest; however these talks didn't produce any results, and in September 2008 it was announced that the Eurovision Song Contest format for Asian production had been sold to a private company from Singapore, Asiavision Pte. Ltd. The original name intended for that event was Asiavision Song Contest, but it was later changed to Our Sound - The Asia-Pacific Song Contest following a request from the ABU, who uses the Asiavision name for their news exchange service. Initially, the contest (which was supposed to be a two program live broadcast TV show with public voting) was set to premiere in 2009, but it was later rescheduled for March 2010 in Macao and then for November 2010 in Mumbai, at the end being postponed indefinitely "due to the ongoing issues between the organizers and EBU".

Shortly before launching the ABU Song Festival, the ABU had been considering the possibility of organizing the ABU ASEAN TV Song Festival in Thailand. Historically, ASEAN song contests had been organized in periods between 1981 and 1997, however since 2011 the ASEAN Festival had been organized between local Radio stations such as Bintang Radio ASEAN.

In November 2011, the ABU announced that they would organize their own TV and Radio Song Festivals to take place in Seoul, the South Korean capital, to coincide with the 49th General Assembly in October 2012. The name Asiavision Song Contest was initially mentioned as a possibility, but they were later officially titled ABU Radio Song Festival and ABU TV Song Festival. According to the ABU, the deadline for participation applications for the ABU TV Song Festival was 18 May 2012.

== Location ==
Location of the host city in South Korea.

Seoul, officially the Seoul Special City, is the capital and largest metropolis of South Korea. A megacity with a population of over 10 million, it is the largest city proper in the OECD developed world. The Seoul National Capital Area is the world's second largest metropolitan area with over 25 million inhabitants, which includes the surrounding Incheon metropolis and Gyeonggi province. Almost a quarter of South Koreans live in Seoul, half of South Koreans live in the metropolitan area, along with over 275,000 international residents.

Located on the Han River, Seoul has been a major settlement for over 2,000 years, with its foundation dating back to 18 B.C. when Baekje, one of the Three Kingdoms of Korea, established its capital in what is now south-east Seoul. It continued as the capital of Korea during the Joseon Dynasty and the Korean Empire. The Seoul National Capital Area is home to four UNESCO World Heritage Sites: Changdeokgung, Hwaseong Fortress, Jongmyo Shrine and the Royal Tombs of the Joseon Dynasty.

=== National host broadcaster ===
Korean Broadcasting System (KBS) was the host broadcaster for the first edition of the inaugural Radio Song Festivals, which was staged in the KBS Hall. The host broadcaster had offered to cover costs for staging the show as well as the accommodation for the participants of ABU TV Song Festival.

== Format ==
Unlike the format used in the Eurovision Song Contest there were two versions of the ABU Song Contest. The ABU Radio Song Contest and the ABU TV Song Festival which took place between 11 and 17 October 2012 during the 49th ABU General Assembly. The theme for the festivals was: 'Beyond the Wave'. This had been inspired by the digital evolution changes in the global media.

At the preliminary round of the Radio Festival, twenty-six participants from fifteen countries across Asia, Australia and the Pacific performed their entries in front of a jury panel. Thirteen entries representing ten countries qualified for the final show which took place at the KBS Hall on 11 October 2012. An international selection committee voted for their favourites and the top five performers were awarded prizes by a panel of judges.

The international jury members were producer and songwriter Il Sang Yun, singer/songwriter Gwang Jin Kim, Suk Lee on behalf of KBS Radio 2, Singaporean songwriter Billy Koh, and Vijay Sadhu from the ABU.

== Participating countries ==
Twenty-six entries participated in a pre-qualification round, fifteen were selected to proceed to the final of the ABU Radio Song Festival (as shown in the following table). However, Sevanaia Yacalevu the Fijian participant withdrew from the competition on 14 September 2012. Yacalevu would have performed last in the running order with the song "Time for a change". Surendra Perera the Sri Lankan participant also announced a withdrawal, although the reason for this is unknown. So the number of finalists was reduced to thirteen.

An international jury awards prizes to their top five favourites after all participating finalists had performed their entries at the ABU Radio Song Festival. The Grand Prix award was issued to the winner, the Gold Award to second place, the Silver Award to third, the Bronze Award to fourth, and a Special Jury award to fifth place.

=== Results ===
Draw	Country	Artist	Song	Language	Place	Award
01	South Korea	Afrodino	"Pepperoni" (페퍼 로니)	Korean	6	-
02	Brunei	Maria Aires	"Yang Terindah"	Malay	3	Silver Award
03	Malaysia	K-Town Clan	"Party Animal"	English	5	Jury Award
04	Vanuatu^{1}	Sammy Ray Jones	"Rinet"	English	4	Bronze Award
05	Pakistan	Bilal Ahmed	"Wada" (وعدہ)	Urdu	6	-
06	Malaysia	Sabhi Sadhi	"Waktu"	Malay	6	-
07	Bhutan	Dechen Wangmo	"Black as Snow"	English, Dzongkha	6	-
08	Iran	Man Brothers	"Iran" (ایران)	Persian	6	-
09	Australia	Danielle Blakey	"Fearless"	English	2	Gold Award
10	Indonesia	Rando Sembiring	"Menunggu"	Indonesian	6	-
11	Singapore	Jae Ang	"Promise Me"	English	6	-
12	Vietnam	Chu Mạnh Chương	"Quê Hương Ơn Bác"	Vietnamese	6	-
13	South Korea	Bily Acoustie	"For a Rest"	Korean	1	Grand Prix

1. Listed as Vanuatu, although the official website lists the nation as Australia/Vanuatu due to the participating broadcaster ABC Television being of Australian origin.

=== Did not qualify ===
- Of the twenty-six preliminary entries, fifteen were selected to proceed to the final of the ABU Radio Song Festival. The remaining eleven did not qualify (as shown in the following table).

Country	Artist	Song	Language
Bhutan	Sonam Tshewang	"Nga Num Che"	Dzongkha
Brunei	Jazz Hayat	"I Stalk Your Profile"	Malay, English
Fiji	Luisa Serevi & Losana Masitabua	"Help Me To Conserve"	English
India	Bimblotica	"I'm a Girl"	Malayalam, English
India	Mathur Lakshmi Keshava & Group	"Vayam Atra Sanjataha Asmakam Punyam"	Sanskrit
Indonesia	Dorkas Lea Waroy	"Aku Rindu"	Indonesian
Iran	Heidar & Shokrollah Sepahvand & Nabi Razazadeh	"Tone of Joyful Music of Lorestan"	Instrumental
Iran	Mohsen Nafar	"Dast Afshan" (دست افشان)	Instrumental
Iran	Shayan Bohluli, Amin Alizadeh & Hamed Khodadadi	"The First Day of Spring"	Persian, English
Kyrgyzstan	Askat Musabekov	"Sagynam" (Сагынам)	Kyrgyz
Sudan	Abdel Gadir Salim	"Bessama"	Arabic

=== Withdrawn ===
Country	Artist	Song	Language
Sri Lanka	Surendra Perera	"Wahi Pabalu Sali" (වැහි පබළු සැලී)	Sinhalese
Fiji	Sevanaia Yacalevu	"Time for a Change"	English

== National jury members ==
The members of the international jury who awarded prizes to their top five favourites are as follows:

Country	Organisation	Jury member
Australia	Head of Marketing & Communications Australian Broadcasting Corporation Radio Australia	Mark Hemetsberger
China	Department of International Relations RTPRC, China Radio International	Qi Song
India	Deputy Director of Programme All India Radio	K. Vageesh
Iran	Advisor - President of Radio International Affairs and Director of Radio International Festival Islamic Rep. of Iran Broadcasting	Behrooz Razavi Nejad
Malaysia	Manager of Traxx FM Radio Television Malaysia	Rohani Harithuddin
Malaysia	Deputy Chief Broadcasting Officer Star Group	Kudsia Kahar
Singapore	Vice President Malay/Indian and Expat. Programming, Radio Mediacorp Pte. Ltd	Zakiah Halim
South Korea	Producer Korean Broadcasting System	Choong Eon Lee
South Korea	Producer Korean Broadcasting System	Kwan Mo Yoo
South Korea	Producer Korean Broadcasting System	In Cheol Hyun
South Korea	Head Producer Korean Broadcasting System	Hyu Cheong Cho
Sri Lanka	Group Director MBC Networks Private Ltd	Shanthi Bhagirathan
Vietnam	International Cooperation Department Voice of Vietnam	Nguyen Thi Thu

== International broadcasts ==
Each participating country was invited to broadcast both events across their respective networks and provide commentary in the native languages to add insight and description to the shows. The festival was not broadcast live, although each broadcaster had stated that they would broadcast the festival between October - November 2012 with an estimated audience of 2 billion people, twenty times the audience that is reached by the Eurovision Song Contest which reaches an audience of approximately 100 million people.

- Australia – Commercial Radio Australia
- Bhutan – Centennial Radio
- Brunei – Radio Televisyen Brunei
- Fiji – Fiji Broadcasting Corporation
- India – All India Radio
- Indonesia – Radio Republik Indonesia
- Iran – Islamic Republic of Iran Broadcasting / Soroush Multimedia Corp.
- Malaysia – Radio Televisyen Malaysia / Astro All Asian Network
- Pakistan – Pakistan Broadcasting Corporation
- Singapore – MediaCorp
- South Korea – KBS 2FM/KBS Radio 2 (21 October 2012)
- Sri Lanka – MBC Networks
- Sudan – Sudan Radio
- Vanuatu – Australian Broadcasting Corporation
- Vietnam – Voice of Vietnam

== See also ==
- ABU Popular Song Contest
- ABU Song Festivals
- ABU TV Song Festival 2012
- Asia-Pacific Broadcasting Union
- Eurovision Song Contest
- Eurovision Song Contest 2012
- Junior Eurovision Song Contest 2012
