= Five Million Money Drop =

Sri Lankan game show

- Genre: Game show
- Presented by: Charith Abeysinghe (seasons 1–2); Ashan Dias (season 3–present)
- Country of origin: Sri Lanka
- Original language: Sinhala
- No. of seasons: 4
- No. of episodes: 112+

Production
- Executive producer: Dhammika Fonseka
- Production locations: Stein Studios, Ratmalana, Sri Lanka
- Running time: 1 hour
- Production companies: Stein Studios; MTV/MBC

Original release
- Network: Sirasa TV
- Release: August 13, 2022 – present

Related
- The Million Pound Drop

Five Million Money Drop is a Sri Lankan game show airing on Sirasa TV. It is based on the US series Million Dollar Money Drop and the original British format The Million Pound Drop. The show premiered on 13 August 2022 and concluded its first season on 5 February 2023. The second season premiered on 2 September 2023, followed by a third season on 4 January 2025. The fourth season, featuring updated gameplay mechanics, premiered on 24 January 2026.

== Format ==
A team of two people are presented with Rs. 5 million in cash, divided into 50 bundles of Rs. 100,000 each. The team must answer seven general knowledge multiple-choice questions to keep the money. The number of options decreases as the game progresses: the first three questions have four options, the next three have three options, and the final question is a "Double Drop" with only two options.

Contestants place their money on the trapdoors they believe correspond to the correct answer. It is compulsory to leave at least one trapdoor clear in every round. Money not placed on any trapdoor or placed on incorrect answers is lost when the trapdoors open.

Question(s)	Number of answers	Time limit (seconds)
1–3	4	60
4–5	3	75
6	3	90
7	2	60

=== Quick Change ===
Contestants can use the "Quick Change" once during the first six questions. This provides an additional 30 seconds to reallocate money. If contestants fail to leave one trapdoor empty or do not place all money before time expires, Quick Change is automatically triggered; if already used, the team is disqualified.

=== Season 4 Additions ===
Starting with the fourth season in 2026, two new mechanics were introduced:

- Drop Savers: Contestants are provided with three "Drop Savers" which can be used to protect specific bundles of money or provide a safety margin during the earlier rounds.
- Double End Option: A strategic variation for the final stages of the game, allowing contestants to alter how they leverage their remaining cash on the final two-choice question.
