= Ananthen Aa Tharu Kumara =

2013 South Korean television series

- අනන්තයෙන් ආ තරු කුමරා
- Genre: Romantic comedy; Fantasy; Science fiction; Drama
- Based on: My Love from the Star by Park Ji-eun
- Countries of origin: South Korea (Original); Sri Lanka (Dubbed broadcast)
- Original language: Sinhala (Dubbed)
- No. of episodes: Approx. 40 (Sri Lankan broadcast); 21 (Original South Korean)

Original release
- Network: Sirasa TV
- Release: 2013 – 2013

Related
- Me Adambarakari; Himanthara

Ananthen Aa Tharu Kumara (Sinhala: අනන්තයෙන් ආ තරු කුමරා; lit. The Star Prince who came from Infinity) is the Sinhala-dubbed broadcast of the critically acclaimed 2013 South Korean romantic fantasy television series My Love from the Star. The series was localized and broadcast in Sri Lanka by Sirasa TV as part of the network's prime-time international drama lineup.

The introduction of the series played a significant role in continuing the Korean Wave (Hallyu) in Sri Lanka. It capitalized on the massive local popularity of its lead actor, Kim Soo-hyun, while introducing a highly successful original Sinhala soundtrack that went viral across the country.

== Premise ==
The story revolves around Do Min-joon, an alien who landed on Earth in 1609 during the Joseon Dynasty. Having lived for 400 years with enhanced physical abilities such as astute vision, hearing, and speed, he holds a cynical view of human beings. As he prepares to finally return to his home planet in the modern era, he meets and becomes entangled with Cheon Song-yi, a famous but arrogant top Hallyu actress.

Despite their contrasting personalities and Min-joon's initial reluctance to interfere in human affairs, the two fall deeply in love, facing dangerous obstacles from Song-yi's past and those who wish to harm her.

== Characters and Original Cast ==
While the series was completely dubbed into Sinhala for the Sri Lankan audience, the characters largely retained their original Korean names and identities.

- Kim Soo-hyun as Do Min-joon: A cold, highly intelligent alien who has lived on Earth for four centuries. Kim Soo-hyun had already established a massive fanbase in Sri Lanka prior to this broadcast due to his role as King Lee Hwon in Moon Embracing the Sun, making his return to Sri Lankan television highly anticipated.
- Jun Ji-hyun as Cheon Song-yi: A top Hallyu actress who is confident, flamboyant, but deeply insecure and lonely.
- Park Hae-jin as Lee Hwi-kyung: Song-yi's childhood friend and the youngest son of a wealthy conglomerate who harbors a long-standing unrequited love for her.
- Yoo In-na as Yoo Se-mi: Song-yi's childhood best friend and fellow actress, who secretly envies Song-yi's success.

== Broadcast and Production ==
=== Localization and Airing ===
Following the massive success of earlier South Korean historical and modern dramas in Sri Lanka, Sirasa TV acquired the broadcasting rights to My Love from the Star.

The localization process was handled by Sirasa TV's in-house dubbing unit. The production required careful translation of South Korean cultural nuances, entertainment industry terminology, and historical Joseon-era dialogue into natural, colloquial Sinhala to appeal to the local audience.

The drama originally aired on weekdays in the 7:30 PM prime-time slot. While the original South Korean broadcast consisted of 21 hour-long episodes, the localized Sri Lankan version was re-edited and split to fit the local commercial broadcast time limits, resulting in approximately 40 episodes for the Sri Lankan run.

=== Rerun and Digital Availability ===
Due to its enduring popularity, Sirasa TV aired a highly anticipated rerun of Ananthen Aa Tharu Kumara in mid-2026. For this broadcast, the network upgraded the series to Full HD technology. Alongside the television rerun, the remastered HD episodes were also made available digitally on Sirasa TV's dedicated YouTube channel titled Ananthayen Aa Tharu Kumara , catering to both returning fans and a new generation of digital viewers.

== Soundtrack ==
A major contributor to the localized version's massive success was its original Sinhala theme song, replacing the original Korean opening track.

The Sinhala theme song, "Ananthayen Aa Tharu Kumara", was written by veteran lyricist Sydney Chandrasekara and performed as a romantic duet by popular Sri Lankan singers Radeesh Vandabona and Indeewaree Hettiarachchi. The song became a massive viral hit across Sri Lanka, deeply resonating with the audience, and has amassed over 14 million views on YouTube.

== Impact and Reception ==
Ananthen Aa Tharu Kumara was highly successful during its broadcast in Sri Lanka, attracting a massive youth and family audience. It cemented Kim Soo-hyun and Jun Ji-hyun as highly recognizable international figures among Sri Lankan television viewers, with audiences praising the distinctive fashion and "cute" aesthetics of the modern and historical settings. The series is frequently cited as one of the pivotal foreign dramas that solidified the Sri Lankan audience's enduring demand for South Korean television content on free-to-air channels.

== See also ==
- Sirasa TV
- My Love from the Star
- Korean Wave
