= Maria (Bruneian singer) =

Bruneian singer-songwriter (born 1989)

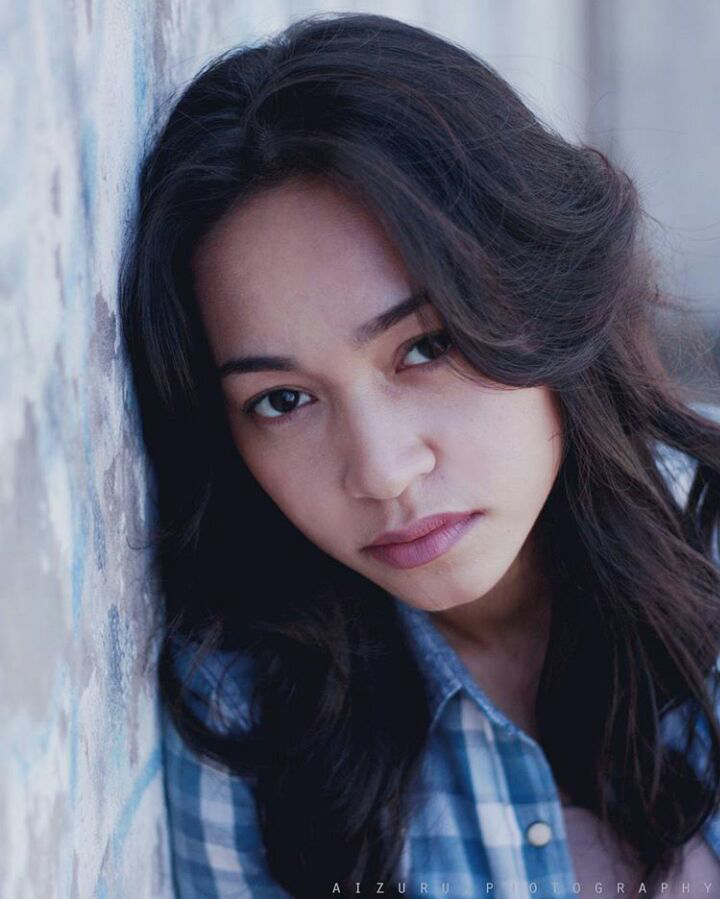
- Portrait of Maria Aires

Background information
- Born: Meria Aires; February 16, 1989 (age 37)
- Origin: Brunei
- Genres: Pop Soft Rock
- Occupation: Singer song-writer
- Years active: 2005–present

Meria Aires (or popularly known as Maria or Meria Aires; born February 16, 1989) is a Bruneian singer-songwriter.

== Biography ==
She began her career in 2005 in a radio singing contest organized by Kristal FM in conjunction with His Majesty the Sultan of Brunei Darussalam's birthday celebrations. Despite only winning Silver, Angan (an original song composed by her own uncle, Nan), was very well received by radio listeners at that time. Her music genre was new to the local during the time and her songs revolutionized the music industry in Brunei. Her ability to play musical instrument such as guitar made her a unique pop singer and interests several songwriters during the time of her early career. It is also notable that her voice and singing skill are one of her unique ability.

The success of, Angan, had encouraged her to try her luck in releasing her first official single, Bisik Hati, in 2006 – a song that had changed her life instantly. She began performing at various state and corporate functions, winning more music awards locally than any other Bruneian celebrities in Brunei's music history and finally releasing her second album (first solo album), Sesaat Kau Hadir, on May 23, 2009. She won the Pelangi Awards on the undisputed four straight years. For the first year of her four-year streak, thanks to her first hit single, Bisik Hati, she won the top female singer category in the award. In 2007, Maria and a male band named The Seeds collaborate and developed a song called Kau Tetap Milikku. This song took a great leap to her career as 'Kau Tetap Milikku' helped her win the 'Song of Choice' category in the Pelangi Award. In 2008, she won the 'Chosen Female Artist' category beating several new top singers. During her fourth year voted for the award, she won the new Pelangi Award's B Mobile's Most Voted Singer category which in the same time became the first singer to win the award.

Quoted in an interview with local media, she recalls a music collaboration with Merah band from Singapore as one of her most memorable moments in her career. Biar Sampai Akhir was launched on the February 13, 2011, at Kallang CC Singapore along with its official music video produced by Singaporean production company Merah in Motion. Despite being a university student in University of Brunei Darussalam, she managed to attend several local live shows in the country.

Aires represented Radio Televisyen Brunei (RTB) Brunei at the first ABU Radio Song Festival, which took place at the KBS Concert Hall in Seoul, South Korea on October 11, 2012, a competition that brought Brunei the Silver award.

== Discography ==
Studio Album

Year	Album
2005	Maria And Destine
2010	Sesaat Engkau Hadir

Singles

Year	Single	Notes
2005	Angan	
2006	Bisik Hati	
2006	Aku Atau Dia	Pelangi FM's Song of the Year 2006
2007	Jatuh Cinta	
2007	Kau Tetap Milikku	Duet with "The Seeds"
2008	Waktu	Pelangi FM's Song of the Year 2008
2009	Sesaat Engkau Hadir	
2009	Kau Segalanya	
2009	Waktu	Remix
2009	Semarak Syawal Mulia	First Hari Raya song
2010	Kini Berakhir Sudah	Album Sesaat Engkau Hadir
2011	Biar Sampai Akhir	Duet with "Merah Band"
2012	Yang Terindah	
2013	Satu Kali	
2014	Jika Tiada Jalan Lain	
2015	Kekasihku	
2016	Bisik Hati	Ballad version

== Awards and achievements ==
Awards

Year	Categories Nominated	Award	Organizing Body	Remarks
2007	Artis Wanita Pilihan	Pelangi Awards 2006/2007	Pelangi FM	Won
2007	Lagu Pilihan (Song of Choice) – Kau Tetap Milikku (duet with The Seeds)	Pelangi Awards 2006/2007	Pelangi FM	Won
2009	Artis Wanita Pilihan (Chosen Female Artist)	Pelangi Awards 2008/2009	Pelangi FM	Won
2009	B.Mobile's Most Voted Artist	Pelangi Awards 2008/2009	Pelangi FM	Won
2009	Artis Wanita Popular (Popular Female Artist)	RTB Awards	RTB	Won
2010	Best Female Artist	Cool Tones Awards	CTA	Won
2012	Lagu Pilihan (Song of Choice) – Jika Tiada Jalan Lain	Pelangi Awards (2012–2013)	Pelangi FM	Won

Other Achievements

Year	Competition	Organizing Body	Country	Status
2005	Kristal Idol	Kristal FM	Brunei	Silver
2012	ABU Radio Song Festival 2012	Asia-Pacific Broadcasting Union	South Korea	Silver

Awards and achievements
Preceded by None	Brunei in the ABU Radio Song Festival; 2012 with "The sweetest memory"	Succeeded by
