= Pubudu Chandrasekara =

Sri Lankan cricketer (born 1981)

Kuruppu Appuhamilage Pubudu Dharshana Chandrasekara (born 17 April 1981) is a Sri Lankan cricketer from Colombo. He is a left-handed batsman and right-arm off-break bowler who plays for Tamil Union Cricket and Athletic Club. Chandrasekara made four appearances for Tamil Union Under-23s during the 2003 season and his List A debut during the 2009–10 season, against Moors Sports Club. From the lower-middle order, he scored 6 runs.
