= Peyman Talebi =

Iranian TV and radio host

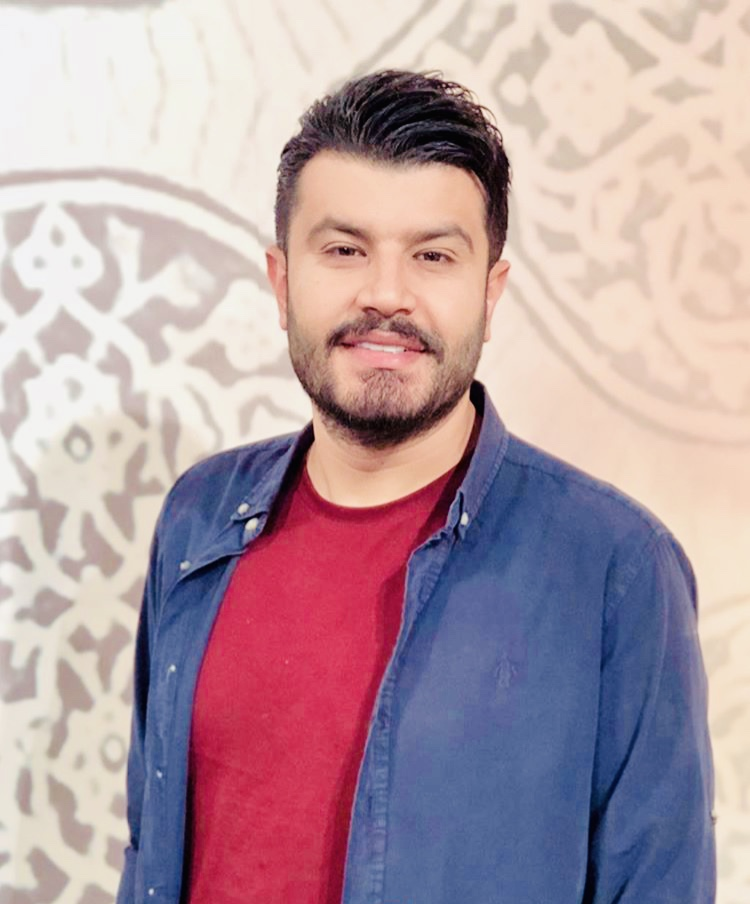
- Born: June 14, 1987 (age 39); Tehran, Iran
- Education: Bachelor civil engineering From University of Hamadan
- Occupations: Presenter, singer
- Years active: 2006–present
- Spouse: Neda Mesbah

Peyman Talebi (Persian: پیمان طالبی; born June 14, 1987, in Tehran) is an Iranian TV and radio host, and singer.

He is a graduate, Bachelor of Civil Engineering from Hamadan University, who started his career as a reporter on provincial TV, then went to radio station. He started in mosques until he went to keyboard classes in 2001 when he was 14 years old.

== Activities ==
He obtained ABU Sri Lanka and has the experience of singing in several radio programs, he says "music is not my concern and it is only my interest." left radio in 2015 and came to television, Talebi has been with the medical and therapeutic program Tabib (TV program), on IRIB TV3 for several years and is the presenter of the weekly Zinde Roud program on the Isfahan provincial network. have been.

== Margins ==
Peyman Talebi, said in sharp words on the Tabib, program that the death toll of Corona is only one number for the authorities. Referring to Zali's statements and Javad Zarif's response, he asked the officials to "close their mouths for just one week" and not give speeches and interviews. The words of this TV presenter had a wide impact and provoked many reactions and caused him to be reprimanded.

Peyman Talebi, the host of Dr. Tabib, said: "You made, the chicken expensive, we got along with it." We will deal with the story of the price of meat and not buying it, the same with the story of the price of fruit, and cars, but the demand now is only one thing, please buy a vaccine.

In one of his performances, the guest doctor of his program stated that prayer is the cause of arthritis and knee pain, and due to Talebi not reacting to these words, a lot of criticism was launched against him and his program and he was banned for a period of time.
