= The Elephant House =

House with elephant sculpture in Toronto, Canada

Coordinates: 43.6696°N 79.4222°W

The elephant takes up most of a front lawn at the Yarmouth Road house.

The Elephant House is a house at 77 Yarmouth Road in the Christie Pits neighbourhood of Toronto, Ontario, Canada that has a life-size plaster mammoth sculpture in the front yard. Placed there since 2003, the sculpture is titled An Elephant in the Room and was made as a student project.

== History ==
The sculpture was created in 1999 by Matt Donovan as part of his student thesis project at Ontario College of Art and Design. It has a fiberglass and chicken wire body, coated with spray foam over a plywood skeleton. The sculpture stands nine and a half feet tall. It originally included a bronze red herring and a flock of life-size concrete black sheep; two of the latter were given to a professor, the herring kept by Donovan, and the elephant stored in his parents' basement.

In 2003, it was given to James Lawson, a friend of Donovan. "From the moment I saw it, it just made me laugh," Lawson states. Lawson describes himself as the "elephant keeper." He saw it as a "ridiculous" way of commemorating the prospects attending his first-time home owner status.

== Reception ==
In 2006, the sculpture and house along with all the other weird homes in the neighborhood were featured in an exhibition titled Neighborhood of One at the Harbourfront Centre, curated by Duncan Farnan who enjoys the city's homeowners who place odd, kitschy things in their yards. He said, "They are not bewitched by the siren song of orthodoxy."

Homeowner Lawson reported in 2006 that about 20 cars a day stopped to look at the sculpture and people approached his front door "more frequently than I want." Toronto journalist Brian McLachlan described it as "fun" rather than practical. He also compared the viewing of the piece as feeling like "you've entered a scene from a quirky teen romance indie movie."
