= Tabib (TV program) =

Iranian medical television program

- Directed by: Ali Zahedi
- Presented by: Peyman Talebi

Production
- Editor: Kiarash Kaviani
- Running time: 60 minutes
- Production company: IRIB TV3

Original release
- Network: IRIB TV3
- Release: 10 December 2016 – present

Tabib (Persian: طبیب) is an Iranian TV talk show dedicated to health issues and disease prevention. The program is hosted by Peyman Talebi and the producer of this program is Ali Zahedi and Kiarash Kaviani.

== Program format ==
Tabibb program, with the aim of providing medical knowledge and public education to the audience has been broadcast live on IRIB TV3 since 15 December 2016. The program is conversational and during the program, viewers' questions are asked directly to the guest doctor.

== Title sequence singer ==
At first, Behnam Safavi was the singer of the title track of Tabibb program And now Garsha Rezaei is the singer of the first title sequence of this program.
