= Shakthi TV =

Sri Lankan television service

Shakthi TV சக்தி தொலைக்காட்சி
- Country: Sri Lanka
- Broadcast area: Sri Lanka; Worldwide
- Network: MTV Channel
- Affiliates: Capital Maharaja
- Headquarters: Colombo

Programming
- Language(s): Tamil

Ownership
- Owner: Capital Maharaja
- Sister channels: TV 1 Sirasa TV

History
- Launched: 20 October 1998

Links
- Website: www.shakthitv.lk

Availability

Terrestrial
- UHF (Badulla): 51
- UHF (Colombo): 25
- UHF (Matale): 25
- UHF (Matara): 25
- UHF (Nuwara Eliya): 34
- UHF (Ratnapura): 51
- UHF (Kilinochchi): 46

Streaming media
- Watch live

Shakthi TV (Tamil: சக்தி) is the first Tamil television service of Sri Lanka. It is the number one Tamil station in Sri Lanka. This general entertainment channel broadcasts serials, films, sports, current affairs, news and children's programs. It mainly airs programs from Sun TV (India). Shakthi TV is available worldwide through YuppTV.

== Frequency and coverage ==
Shakthi TV broadcasts on a UHF frequency from 05.00 to 00.00.
