= Shakthi FM =

Colombo, Sri Lanka; Sri Lanka
- Broadcast area: Sri Lanka
- Frequencies: Island Wide 103.9MHz Hunnasgiriya, Kalutara, Kilinochchi, Nayabedda, Trincomalee, Vavuniya, Mount. Oliphant; 104.1MHz Union Place, Gammaduwa, Gongala, Jaffna, Mannar, Sri Lanka

Programming
- Language: Tamil
- Format: Tamil music
- Affiliations: MBC Radio Network

Ownership
- Owner: MBC Networks
- Sister stations: Sirasa FM; Yes FM; Legends 96.6; Y FM ( Sri Lanka)

History
- First air date: 20 November 1998

Links
- Webcast: www.shakthifm.com/shakthifm.html
- Website: www.shakthifm.com

Shakthi FM is a Sri Lankan Tamil language channel available on air. Shakthi ("power"), from Tantric Shaktism is the female divine energy of creation. One of the Tamil radio channel with island-wide coverage, including the Jaffna Peninsula and most parts of the North Eastern Province of Sri Lanka, Shakthi FM broadcasts music, live news, interactive interviews and a host of other programme formats that are innovations in Tamil radio in Sri Lanka. shakthi.fm is a website almost have all Tamil mp3 songs.

== Frequencies ==
Islandwide-103.9 MHz, 104.1 MHz.
