= MBC Networks =

Sri Lankan media company

MBC Networks (Pvt) Ltd
- Type: Private
- Industry: Radio
- Founded: 1993
- Headquarters: Colombo, Sri Lanka
- Area served: Sri Lanka
- Key people: Buddhi Wickramanayake (CEO)
- Products: Shakthi FM; Sirasa FM; Yes FM; Y FM (Sri Lanka); Legends 96.6
- Owner: Capital Maharaja

MBC Networks (Pvt) Ltd is a Sri Lankan media company which owns five national radio stations - Shakthi FM, Sirasa FM, Yes FM, Y FM and Legends FM. The company was established in 1993 by the Capital Maharaja conglomerate.
