= Yes FM =

Yes 101
- Colombo; Sri Lanka
- Frequency: FM: 100.8 MHz–101.0 MHz

Programming
- Format: Contemporary hit radio, EDM

Ownership
- Owner: MBC Networks
- Sister stations: Sirasa FM, Shakthi FM, Y FM, Legends 96.6

History
- First air date: 10 December 1993; 32 years ago

Links
- Webcast: yesfmonline.com/live-radio
- Website: yesfmonline.com

Yes 101 (100.8, 101.0 F.M.) is an English radio station in Sri Lanka. Yes FM principally plays contemporary hit music.

Yes 101 commenced broadcasting on December 10, 1993, at 6.00 am. It is one of the radio channels owned by The Capital Maharaja Organization Ltd, a leading conglomerate in Sri Lanka. The main target audience age groups are teens and young adults. Its broadcast ranges from contemporary hit music to breaking news.

== Presenters and Shows ==
Yes FM's DJs are some of the most popular in Sri Lanka. Since its inception the station has played host to a number of International DJ's.

=== Shows ===
* The Morning Fix with Dom and Asanka
- YES 101 Weekdays with Josh and Tash
- YES 101 Afternoons with Shezad
- YES 101 Evenings with Shey & Brian
- The Nighttime Takeover with SnowV
- Active Sounds
- Weekend Mix Tapes with Shevin
- Phatt 30 with Shezad
- The Score
- Breakfast 101
- Home Grown Top 15 with Yazmin
- Easy 101
- Release Yourself with Roger Sanchez
- In The Mood with Nicole Moudaber
- Spinnin' Deep with The Deep Mix
- Claptone's Clapcast
- Underground Therapy with Jay Vibes
- Group Therapy with Above & Beyond
- A State of Trance with Armin Van Buuren
- The Malinchak Show with Chris Malinchak
- Monstercat with Silk Showcase
- No Xcuses with EDX
- Purified Radio with Nora En Pure
- Panic Room with Voodoo Child
- Vamos Radio Show with Rio De La Duna
- Sister Bliss In Session
- Toolroom Radio with Mark Knight
- Sunsets with Chicane
- The Anjunadeep Edition
- Transitions with John Digweed
- KU DE TA Radio
- Traxsource Live
- Guido's Lounge Café
- Area10 On Air with MK

=== Former shows ===
- Weekend Top 30 and Remix Top 30 with Hollywood Hamilton
- Protocol Radio with Nicky Romero
- Tiësto's Club Life
- Rick Dees Weekly Top 40
- Nocturnal with Matt Darey
- Global with Carl Cox
- The Dave Koz Show
- Planet Perfecto with Paul Oakenfold
- Spinnin Sessions with Matt Thiel
- Sankeys Ibiza Radio with Kellie Allen
- UMF Radio with RioTgear
- Future Sound of Egypt with Aly & Fila
- Rebirth Radio with Rachit
- Cycles Radio with Max Graham
- Club 101 with Colombo House Mafia
- Drumcode Live with Adam Beyer
- Identity with Sander van Doorn
- Cr2 Live & Direct with MYNC
- Darklight Sessions with Fedde Le Grand
- Kryder's Kryteria Radio
