= TV 1 (Sri Lankan TV channel) =

Sri Lankan television station

- The logo of TV 1
- Country: Sri Lanka
- Broadcast area: Sri Lanka
- Headquarters: Colombo

Programming
- Languages: English and Sinhalese
- Picture format: 1080i HDTV

Ownership
- Owner: MTV Channel/Capital Maharaja
- Sister channels: Shakthi TV; Sirasa TV

History
- Launched: 14 December 1992
- Former names: MTV Newsvision (1992), MTV (1998), Channel One MTV, MTV Sports (2012), MTV (2015)

Links
- Website: www.tv1.lk

TV 1 is a Sri Lankan general entertainment television channel that provides content in both English and Sinhalese, aimed at the youth market. It was founded in 1992 as MTV Newsvision, making it one of Sri Lanka's first privately owned television channels. Its sister channel, MTV, was renamed Sirasa TV in June 1998, and MTV Newsvision was renamed MTV. MTV was later rebranded as Channel One MTV. On 26 January 2012, the channel was relaunched as MTV Sports. MTV Sports was rebranded as MTV in July 2015. The channel was renamed TV 1 on 21 January 2016.

The channel is available on UHF channel 58/59 in the Colombo area and on UHF channel 51 in the Kandy area. It is also available on PEO TV. TV 1 is owned by MTV Channel (Pvt) Ltd, part of the Capital Maharaja conglomerate.

== Teledramas ==
- Balika Vadhu as Punchi Manali - පුංචි මනාලි
- Kindurangana
- Selfie
- Secret Garden (South Korean TV series) as Me Adambarakari
