= Sirasa TV =

Sri Lankan television network

Sirasa TV සිරස TV
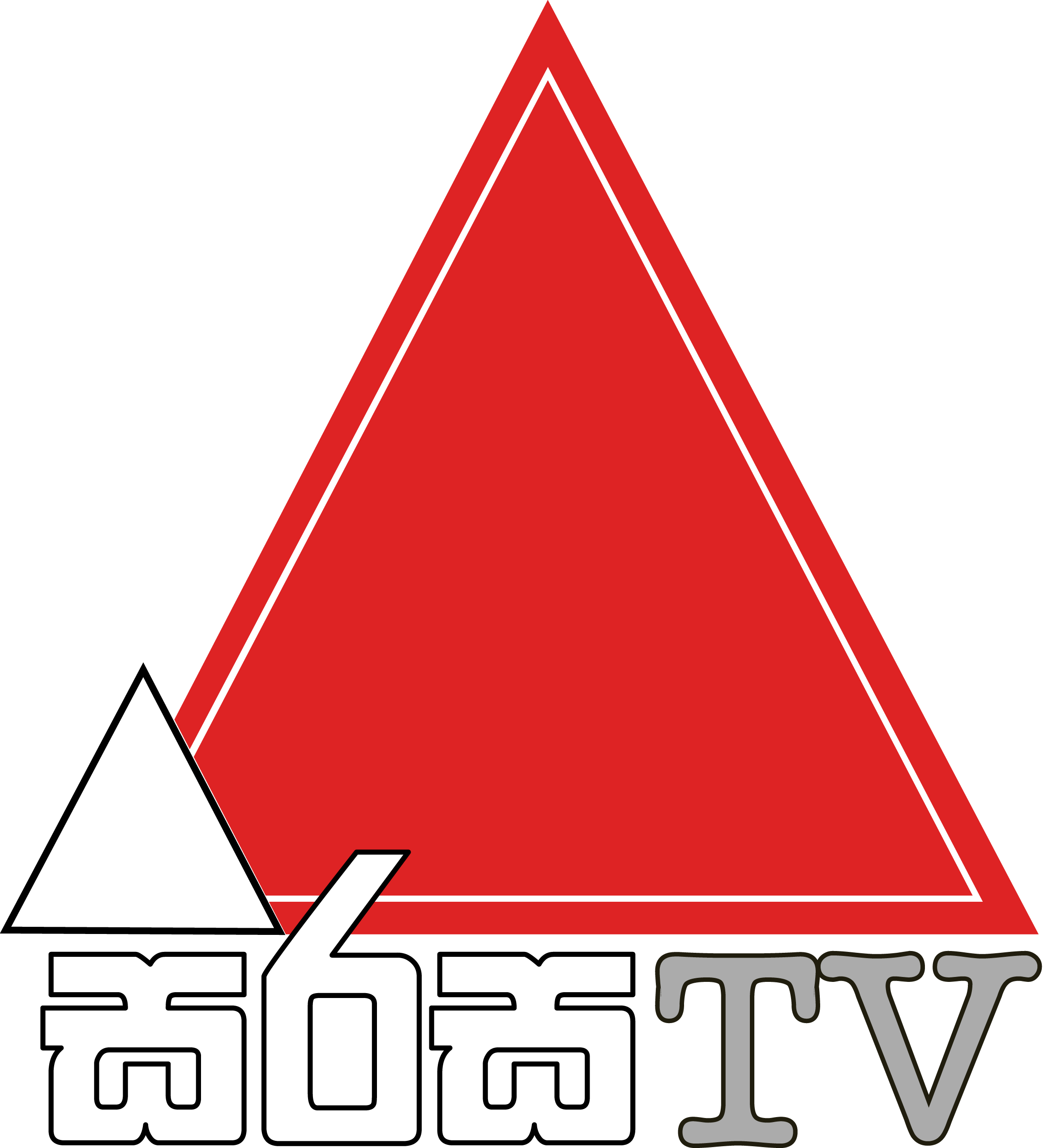
- Country: Sri Lanka
- Network: MTV Channel
- Headquarters: Colombo

Programming
- Language: Sinhalese
- Picture format: 1080p HDTV

Ownership
- Owner: Capital Maharaja
- Key people: Asoka Dias(Director)
- Sister channels: TV 1 Shakthi TV

History
- Launched: 10 June 1998

Links
- Website: www.sirasatv.lk

Availability

Terrestrial
- UHF (Union Place) (FTA): Channel 23
- UHF (Namunukula) (FTA): Channel 29
- UHF (Hunnasgiriya) (FTA): Channel 58
- UHF (Gammaduwa) (FTA): Channel 23
- UHF (Hanthana) (FTA): Channel 29
- UHF (Gongala) (FTA): Channel 29
- UHF (Minuwangala) (FTA): Channel 58
- UHF (Nuwara Eliya) (FTA): Channel 27
- Peo TV (Pay TV): Channel 10
- Dialog TV (Satellite Pay TV): Channel 08

Streaming media
- Online: Watch live

Sirasa TV (Sinhala: සිරස TV) is a Sri Lankan private television network that was officially launched on 10 June 1998. It was established by MTV Channel (Private) Limited as a Sinhala-language digital terrestrial network and sister television channel to Sirasa FM, an established private Sinhala radio station launched in 1994.

== Ownership and Shareholding ==
Sirasa TV is owned and operated by The Capital Maharaja Group (formerly Capital Maharaja Organisation Limited), one of Sri Lanka’s largest multi-sector conglomerates, in joint venture with Gregson Holdings Ltd. Following its launch, the international media firm International Media Management also acquired an investment equity stake in MTV Channel (Pvt) Ltd.

The group's broadcasting operations trace back to the establishment of its flagship English service in 1992—initially branded as MTV Channel and later rebranded as MTV Sports before becoming TV 1 (currently operated as TV One). Today, Sirasa TV functions alongside its two primary sister stations:

- TV 1 – English and bilingual general entertainment network.
- Shakthi TV – Sri Lanka’s first private Tamil-language terrestrial broadcaster, launched in 1998.

Corporate oversight and executive leadership for the broadcast division are directed by key executives including Group Director Asoka Dias. The media division's central headquarters are located at Braybrook Place, Colombo 02, Sri Lanka.

== Transmission and Availability ==
Sirasa TV broadcasts primarily in Sinhalese and delivers content in 1080p HDTV format. The network is accessible nationwide through free-to-air (FTA) terrestrial UHF relay transmitters, major subscription pay-TV platforms, and digital streaming.

Platform	Location / Provider	Channel / Frequency	Format / Details
Terrestrial (FTA)	Union Place (Colombo)	UHF Channel 23	Analogue / Digital Free-to-Air
Terrestrial (FTA)	Namunukula	UHF Channel 29	Analogue / Digital Free-to-Air
Terrestrial (FTA)	Hunnasgiriya	UHF Channel 58	Analogue / Digital Free-to-Air
Terrestrial (FTA)	Gammaduwa	UHF Channel 23	Analogue / Digital Free-to-Air
Terrestrial (FTA)	Hanthana	UHF Channel 29	Analogue / Digital Free-to-Air
Terrestrial (FTA)	Gongala	UHF Channel 29	Analogue / Digital Free-to-Air
Terrestrial (FTA)	Minuwangala	UHF Channel 58	Analogue / Digital Free-to-Air
Terrestrial (FTA)	Nuwara Eliya	UHF Channel 27	Analogue / Digital Free-to-Air
Pay TV	SLT PEO TV	Channel 10 (SD) / Channel 306 (HD)	IPTV
Pay TV	Dialog TV	Channel 08	Digital Satellite Pay TV
Streaming	Web / Mobile	www.sirasatv.lk	Official Live Webcast

== Security incidents and attacks ==
Sirasa TV and its news division, News 1st, have been subject to physical attacks and political pressure, particularly during periods of political turmoil and civil conflict in Sri Lanka.

=== 2009 Depanama studio attack ===
On 6 January 2009, an armed group of masked individuals raided the newly constructed MBC/MTV studio and transmission facility in Depanama, Pannipitiya. The assailants held security personnel and staff at gunpoint, assaulted employees, and damaged master control rooms and broadcast hardware before detonating explosives and setting fire to the facility. An unexploded Claymore mine was later discovered and defused by authorities on the premises.

The raid followed heightened tension after state-controlled media criticized Sirasa TV's reporting on the military's capture of Kilinochchi during the Sri Lankan Civil War. Although broadcasting was temporarily interrupted, transmissions resumed later that day using backup equipment. The attack was widely condemned by domestic and international press freedom organizations, including the Committee to Protect Journalists (CPJ), UNESCO, and the International Federation of Journalists (IFJ). Two days after visiting the bombed facility to condemn the raid, investigative journalist and *The Sunday Leader* editor Lasantha Wickrematunge was assassinated.

=== 2022 attacks on News 1st journalists ===
On 9 July 2022, during the Aragalaya protests, a team of News 1st journalists reporting live outside the private residence of then-Prime Minister Ranil Wickremesinghe in Colombo was assaulted by personnel from the Sri Lanka Police and the Special Task Force (STF).

A secondary crew sent to assist the injured journalists was also subjected to baton charges and tear gas. At least eight News 1st personnel—including reporters Sarasi Peiris and Kalimuttu Chandran, and camera operator Varuna Sampath—sustained injuries and were admitted to the Colombo National Hospital. The televised assault prompted protests from media trade unions and condemnation from international organizations, including CPJ, Reporters Without Borders (RSF), and the IFJ, leading to disciplinary suspensions for several senior police officers involved.

== News and current affairs ==
Sirasa TV's news and current affairs programming is produced by News 1st, the central news-gathering division of MTV Channel (Pvt) Ltd and the Capital Maharaja Group.Operating under the broadcast slogans "With the People" (Sinhala: ජනතාව සමඟ) and "We Report, You Decide" (Sinhala: සත්‍යයේ සටහන බුද්ධියේ විමසුමට), the division focuses on breaking news coverage, investigative reporting, and public affairs journalism. Established in its multi-platform format in October 2003, the division provides news broadcasts in Sinhala for Sirasa TV, in Tamil for Shakthi TV, and in English for TV 1, in addition to radio broadcasts and digital outlets.

On Sirasa TV, regular programming includes daily prime-time bulletins at 12:00 noon, 7:00 PM, and 10:00 PM, alongside hourly updates titled Live@55. In 2013, News 1st journalist Shameer Rasooldeen received the joint Silver Ricardo Ortega Memorial Prize for broadcast journalism at the United Nations Correspondents Association (UNCA) Awards in New York.

=== Current affairs programming ===
Sirasa TV broadcasts several regular political analysis and discussion programs:

- Satana (Sinhala: සටන; lit. 'The Fight') – A weekly live political debate program broadcast on Tuesday nights, featuring panel discussions between government and opposition politicians alongside audience participation via social media.
- Dawasa (Sinhala: දවස; lit. 'The Day') – A weekday evening current affairs broadcast focusing on political developments and legislative proceedings.
- Pathikada (Sinhala: පැතිකඩ; lit. 'Perspectives') – A weekday morning interview segment hosted by Asoka Dias, featuring discussions with politicians, economists, and civil society figures.
- Aluth Mawatha (Sinhala: අලුත් මාවත; lit. 'New Path') – An analytical program examining domestic policy, economic issues, and international affairs.

=== Community initiatives ===
News 1st also operates Gammadda (Sinhala: ගම්මැද්ද; lit. 'Heart of the Village'), a rural community outreach initiative initiated under Capital Maharaja Group chairman R. Rajamahendran. In collaboration with researchers from the University of Peradeniya, the project conducts field surveys to document infrastructural issues in rural communities, including access to clean drinking water, village transport links, and school facilities. The initiative mobilizes private donations and community volunteer networks, maintaining local village societies (Gammadda Saviya) for project maintenance and a volunteer corps (V-Force) for disaster relief.

== Programming ==
Since its inception in 1998, Sirasa TV has maintained a prime-time programming strategy heavily centered on Sinhala-language teledramas, international reality formats, localized foreign serials, and dubbed animated series. The channel disrupted traditional Sri Lankan state television scheduling by introducing structured evening prime-time drama blocks, interactive audience voting, and high-budget licensed game shows.

=== Teledramas ===
Prime-time broadcasting on Sirasa TV (7:00 PM to 10:00 PM) is dominated by serialized daily dramas. The network produces original Sinhala teledramas while also broadcasting Sinhala-dubbed acquisitions from India, South Korea, and Turkey.

==== Original Sinhala Productions ====
In daily prime-time slots (7:30 PM–9:30 PM), the station airs long-running social, thriller, and romantic dramas. Major ratings drivers over the years have included flagship dramas such as Salsapuna, Neela Pabalu, Aaley, and Kiya Denna Adare Tharam.

Below is a list of notable original Sinhala teledramas broadcast by the network:

- Aalawanthi
- Aaley
- Adaraya Gindarak
- Adare Ahasa Tharam
- Adare Suwanda Aran
- Ado
- Ahankara Adare
- Api Ape
- Bharyawo
- Chandoli
- Daam
- Dawala Yamaya
- Eka Diga Kathawak
- Ganga Addara
- Gehenu Lamai
- Hada Wila Sakmana
- Helankada
- Hirumali
- Hitha Langa Hinahuna
- Hithata Wahal Weemi
- Ilandariya
- Kalu Ahasa
- Kiya Denna Adare Tharam
- Kotu
- Kunchanada
- Lover's Leap
- Maayarajini
- Maayavi
- Madol Kale Weerayo
- Makara Dadayama
- Minigandela
- Neela Pabalu
- Neela Samanali
- Oba Nisa
- Paan Batta
- Pahasara
- Piyambana Munissam (Flying Bullets)
- Rahai Jeevithe
- Ras
- Rathu Pichcha
- Rocky
- Ruwan Maliga
- Sakkaran
- Sakuge Lokaya
- Sal Mal Aramaya
- Samarapoori
- Sanda Tharu Mal
- Sansara
- Sansara Sakmana
- Sidanganavo
- Sihina Puraya
- Sihina Wasanthayak
- Sujatha
- Suravimana
- Susumata Pawa Rahasin
- Thaththa
- Thurya
- Uthum Pathum

==== Situational Comedies ====
Sirasa TV pioneered popular situational comedies in Sri Lanka during the late 1990s and 2000s, establishing a strong foundation with classics like Nonawaruni Mahatwaruni (featuring Rodney Warnakula and Bandu Samarasinghe) and the workplace comedy Yes Boss.

Notable comedy teledramas broadcast by the network include:

- Amarabandu Rupasinghe
- Andun Kundun
- Dankuda Banda
- Medi Sina
- Nebaraya
- Nonawaruni Mahatwaruni
- Raja Kaduwa
- Sabhawen Awasarai
- Two Rodneys
- Yes Boss
- Yes Madam

==== Sinhala-Dubbed Foreign Serials ====
The channel played a pivotal role in popularizing Sinhala-dubbed foreign soap operas in Sri Lanka, localizing international dialogue and soundtrack tracks.

- Indian Dramas: Early localized mega-dramas like Shanti, Mahagedara (Kyunki Saas Bhi Kabhi Bahu Thi), and Praveena (Kasautii Zindagii Kay) established deep audience retention. Later acquisitions included Me Aadarayai (Ye Hai Mohabbatein), Swapna (Diya Aur Baati Hum), Imlie, and the supernatural series Prema Dadayama (Naagin).
- South Korean Dramas (K-Dramas): Sirasa TV introduced Korean wave dramas to Sri Lankan television with localized dubs, including Me Adambarakari (Secret Garden), Himanthara (Descendants of the Sun), Ananthen Aa Tharu Kumara (My Love from the Star), Himathuhina (I Can Hear Your Voice), Ikkai Maai (Pinocchio), and Yawes Lu Kumara (The Emperor: Owner of the Mask).
- Turkish Dramas: The station expanded into Turkish television dubs with the drama series Kisa (Kadın).

=== Reality Television & Licensed Game Shows ===
In mid-2005, Sirasa TV introduced the modern reality TV concept to Sri Lanka with Sirasa Superstar, adapted from the global Idol format. The show ran for seven seasons from 2005 to 2016, drawing over 22,000 applicants during its inaugural season, establishing Sugathadasa Indoor Stadium finale attendance records, and pioneering short-message service (SMS) shortcode voting (e.g., 7788) in Sri Lankan entertainment.

Following the success of homegrown shows, MTV Channel (Pvt) Ltd acquired Sri Lankan rights to major global media franchises:

- Sirasa Lakshapathi – The official Sri Lankan adaptation of Who Wants to Be a Millionaire?, running for 12 seasons.
- The Voice Sri Lanka – Licensed from ITV Studios/Talpa, spanning main, The Voice Teens, and The Voice Kids editions.
- Sri Lanka's Got Talent – The Sri Lankan adaptation of Fremantle's Got Talent franchise.
- 5 Million Money Drop – Local adaptation of Endemol Shine's The Million Pound Drop.
- Sirasa Catchpoint – High-energy physical game show format launched in 2024 adapting BBC One's The Celebritiy Catchpoint.

==== Summary of Reality and Franchise Formats ====
Format / Program Name	Franchise / Type	Seasons / Status	Notes	Citation
Sirasa Lakshapathi	Who Wants to Be a Millionaire?	12 Seasons (Season 12: To be aired in mid 2026)	Flagship quiz show	
Sirasa Superstar	Music Competition	7 Seasons	Landmark reality singing show	
The Voice Sri Lanka	The Voice	3 Seasons	Music talent competition	
The Voice Teens	The Voice	3 Seasons (Season 3: Currently on air)	Youth singing competition	
The Voice Kids	The Voice	1 Season	Junior singing competition	
Sri Lanka's Got Talent	Got Talent	3 Seasons (Season 3: Concluded in late 2025)	Variety talent competition	
5 Million Money Drop	The Million Pound Drop	4 Seasons (Season 4: Currently on air)	Live money-dropping game show	
Sirasa Dancing Stars	Dance Competition	3 Seasons	Celebrity dance contest	
Sirasa Catchpoint	Action Game Show	1 Season	Physical agility show	
Sirasa Pentathlon	Quiz Show	2 Seasons	Inter-school knowledge competition	
Sirasa Film Star	Talent Hunt	1 Season	Acting talent contest	
Sirasa Kumariya	Pageant / Reality	2 Seasons	Beauty and personality contest	

=== Children's Programming and Animation ===
Sirasa TV introduced a dedicated dubbing department to translate international Western animation into Sinhala. Translators including Chandra Ranatunga, Chaminda Keerthirathna, Rochana Wimaladewa, Gaminda Priyawiraj, and Suneth Chithrananda localized international cartoons using culturally familiar humor, poetic Sinhala rhymes, and domestic character naming conventions.

Culturally prominent localized series include:

- Soora Pappa (Asterix the Gaul) – Renowned for its rich Sinhala dialogue and character names ending in "-pappa" (e.g., Soora Pappa, Jim Pappa).
- Tin Tin (The Adventures of Tintin) – Adventure series dubbed into Sinhala.
- Giripura Aththo (The Flintstones) – Localized adaptation of the Hanna-Barbera stone-age comedy.
- Dagaya (Dennis the Menace) – Popular children's animated comedy.
- Api Raja Ibbo (Teenage Mutant Ninja Turtles) – Action animated series.

==== Localized Animated Series ====
Original Title	Localized Sinhala Title	Transliteration	Citation
Asterix the Gaul	සූර පප්පා	Soora Pappa	
Baby Follies	තොත්ත බබාලා	Thoththa Babala	
Boule et Bill (2004)	බිලියයි බඩියයි	Billy & Buddy	
Boule et Bill (2015)	බව්ව මල්ලි	Bawwa Malli	
Dennis the Menace	දගයා	Dagaya	
Kissyfur	පැංචා	Pancha	
Léonard	ජස්ටින් සහ ටෙස්ටින්	Justin & Testing	
Lucky Luke	කවුද බෝයි	Kauda Boy	
Miraculous: Tales of Ladybug & Cat Noir	රතු පැංචි	Rathu Panchi	
Scooby-Doo, Where Are You!	ස්කූබි ඩූ	Scooby Doo	
Teenage Mutant Ninja Turtles	අපි රජ ඉබ්බෝ	Api Raja Ibbo	
The Adventures of Tintin	ටිං ටිං	Tin Tin	
The Flintstones	ගිරිපුර ඇත්තෝ	Giripura Aththo	
The Garfield Show	ගාර්ෆීල්ඩ්	Garfield	
The Silver Brumby	රිදී අශ්වයා	Ridee Ashwaya	
The Wind in the Willows	මන්ඩුක භවන	Manduka Bavana	

=== Variety, Lifestyle and Comedy ===
Sirasa TV also broadcasts non-scripted entertainment, cookery, and magazine programs:

- Api Nodanna Live – Iconic sketch-comedy and hidden-camera show featuring band and comedic skits.
- Magic Seeya – Children's illusion and entertainment magic program.
- Kedella – Architectural and home interior design magazine program.
- Auto Vision – Motor news and automotive review show.
- Cook Pakshaya – Celebrity culinary competition show.
- Tharu Irida – Sunday evening celebrity talk and lifestyle segment.
