= Sirasa FM =

Colombo; Sri Lanka
- Broadcast area: Sri Lanka
- Frequency: FM: 106.5 MHz–106.7 MHz

Programming
- Language: Sinhala
- Format: Contemporary hit radio

Ownership
- Owner: MBC Networks
- Sister stations: Yes FM, Shakthi FM, Y FM, Legends 96.6

History
- First air date: 1994; 32 years ago

Links
- Webcast: sirasafm.lk/liveradio
- Website: sirasafm.lk

Sirasa FM is a Sinhala language radio station in Sri Lanka. MBC Networks, a subsidiary of Sri Lankan conglomerate Capital Maharaja Group, operate the radio station. It is one of the three successful radio stations started by MBC Networks in the 1990s. The other two being Yes FM and Shakthi FM. The programming of the radio station includes talk shows, and Sinhala and Hindi top hits. Sirasa FM is the first private media organisation to be allowed to broadcast news in Sri Lanka. However, Sirasa FM was banned broadcasting news after the station broadcast a false report of a nonexistent countrywide curfew. The ban was not lifted for two months.
