= MTV Channel =

Sri Lankan media company

MTV Channel (Pvt) Ltd
- Company type: Private
- Industry: Television
- Founded: 1992
- Headquarters: Colombo, Sri Lanka
- Area served: Sri Lanka
- Key people: Chevaan Daniel (Group Director); Yasarath Kamalsiri (CEO)
- Products: News First; Shakthi TV; Sirasa TV; TV 1
- Owner: Capital Maharaja; Gregson Holdings; International Media Management

MTV Channel (Pvt) Ltd is a Sri Lankan media company which owns three national television channels - Shakthi TV, Sirasa TV and TV 1. It also owns the Hit TV, News First and Ethalaya.com. The company was established in 1992 as joint venture between Capital Maharaja and Singapore Telecommunications. Singapore Telecommunications sold its share in the company to Gregson Holdings Ltd in 1998. Later International Media Management invested in the company.
