= List of 2017 box office number-one films in Thailand =

This is a list of films which placed number one at the weekend box office for the year 2017 only in Bangkok, Metropolitan region and Chiang Mai, Thailand with the gross in Thai baht.

== Number-one films ==
#	Weekend end date	Film	Gross (฿ million)	Weekend openings in the Top 10	Ref.
1	January 1, 2017	The Great Wall	28.50	I Love You Two (#3), Sausage Party (#8)	
2	January 8, 2017	The Great Wall	9.81	Railroad Tigers (#2), Patriots Day (#3), Allied (#4), Why Him? (#7)	
3	January 15, 2017	Arrival	12.09	La La Land (#2), School Tales (#4), Live by Night (#10)	
4	January 22, 2017	xXx: Return of Xander Cage	40.57	Jackie (#4), The Founder (#8)	
5	January 29, 2017	Resident Evil: The Final Chapter	45.58	Kung Fu Yoga (#4), The Red Turtle (#9)	
6	February 5, 2017	Mr. Hurt	25.00	Split (#3), Monster Trucks (#4), Tomorrow I will Date with Yesterday's You (#5), Sleepless (#7)	
7	February 12, 2017	Fifty Shades Darker	13.41	Thong Dee Fun Khao (#3), Hacksaw Ridge (#4), The Lego Batman Movie (#7), Manchester by the Sea (#10)	
8	February 19, 2017	John Wick: Chapter 2	27.84	The Moment (#4), Doraemon: Nobita and the Birth of Japan 2016 (#6), A Cure for Wellness (#9)	
9	February 26, 2017	John Wick: Chapter 2	11.36	Guardians (#2), Fallen (#3), Sword Art Online the Movie: Ordinal Scale (#4), Journey to the West: The Demons Strike Back (#5), Hidden Figures (#6), Thibaan The Series (#7)	
10	March 5, 2017	Logan	46.0	The Space Between Us (#2), A Dog's Purpose (#4), Attraction (#8)	
11	March 12, 2017	Kong: Skull Island	39.60	Don't Knock Twice (#3), Present Perfect (#9)	
12	March 19, 2017	Beauty and the Beast	58.86	Karma: Director’s Cut (#4), It's Only the End of the World (#9), The Last Face (#10)	
13	March 26, 2017	Beauty and the Beast	23.35	Power Rangers (#2), Life (#3), Oversize Cops (#4), A Silent Voice (#5), We Are X (#8)	
14	April 2, 2017	Ghost in the Shell	18.28	The Boss Baby (#2), Siam Square (#4)	
15	April 9, 2017	The Boss Baby	8.03	Get Out (#3), Smurfs: The Lost Village (#4), MindGamers (#7), Zombie Fighters (#8)	
16	April 16, 2017	The Fate of the Furious	129.64	What's for Dinner, Mom? (#7), Confidential Assignment (#9)	
17	April 23, 2017	The Fate of the Furious	49.99	The Shack (#3), Kamen Rider Heisei Generations: Dr. Pac-Man vs. Ex-Aid & Ghost with Legend Rider (#5), Yu-Gi-Oh! The Dark Side of Dimensions (#7), Fabricated City (#8), From A House on Willow Street (#9)	
18	April 30, 2017	Guardians of the Galaxy Vol. 2	55.30	Thailand Only (#3), Personal Shopper (#5)	
19	May 7, 2017	Bad Genius	41.97	The Osiris Child: Science Fiction Volume One (#5), Doraemon: Nobita's Space Heroes (#6), The Zookeeper's Wife (#7), Song to Song (#8)	
20	May 14, 2017	Bad Genius	21.48	Alien: Covenant (#2), King Arthur: Legend of the Sword (#3)	
21	May 21, 2017	King Arthur: Legend of the Sword	7.84	Unlocked (#4), Fairy Tail: Dragon Cry (#6), The 100th Love with You (#7), The Hunter's Prayer (#8)	
22	May 28, 2017	Pirates of the Caribbean: Dead Men Tell No Tales	60.39	The Monster (#6), Two Is a Family (#10)	
23	June 4, 2017	Wonder Woman	57.92	Baywatch (#3), Resident Evil: Vendetta (#4), T2 Trainspotting (#5), The Promise (#9), Sakurada Reset: Part 2 (#10)	
24	June 11, 2017	The Mummy	60.43	Kedi (#5), The Void (#6), Ancien and the Magic Tablet (#8)	
25	June 18, 2017	Despicable Me 3	29.12	Before I Fall (#4), Let's Go Jets (#8), Kiseki: Sobito of That Day (#9)	
26	June 25, 2017	Transformers: The Last Knight	90.30	—N/a	
27	July 2, 2017	Transformers: The Last Knight	29.46	Kidnap (#3), 2:22 (#4), Driver (#7), 20th Century Women (#8), Handsome Devil (#10)	
28	July 9, 2017	Spider-Man: Homecoming	94.81	The Lure (#7)	
29	July 16, 2017	War for the Planet of the Apes	27.13	47 Meters Down (#3), Wish Upon (#4), Kill Switch (#6), Faith of Miracle (#10)	
30	July 23, 2017	Valerian and the City of a Thousand Planets	23.07	Dunkirk (#2), Kuroko's Basketball The Movie: Last Game (#5)	
31	July 30, 2017	Valerian and the City of a Thousand Planets	15.91	Slum Boy Superstar-to-be (#2), Wu Kong (#4), Detective Conan: Crimson Love Letter (#6), Rough Night (#8), Revolt (#10)	
32	August 6, 2017	Atomic Blonde	7.30	The Battleship Island (#4), 15+ Coming of Age (#6)	
33	August 13, 2017	Annabelle: Creation	30.59	The Dark Tower (#2), Cars 3 (#3)	
34	August 20, 2017	Annabelle: Creation	11.47	Ghost House (#2), Overdrive (#3), Gintama (#6), Net I Die (#7), Silence (#8), Peach Girl (#9)	
35	August 27, 2017	The Hitman's Bodyguard	11.59	Saranae Love You (#2), The Beguiled (#7)	
36	September 3, 2017	Som Pak Sian	31.72	What Happened to Monday (#2), American Made (#3), The Emoji Movie (#5), Security (#6), Inhumans (#8)	
37	September 10, 2017	It	25.36	The Promise (#3), The Glass Castle (#8)	
38	September 17, 2017	Baby Driver	10.39	American Assassin (#3), Tulip Fever (#9)	
39	September 24, 2017	Kingsman: The Golden Circle	29.68	mother! (#7), Mary and the Witch's Flower (#8), Walk with Me (#9)	
40	October 1, 2017	Kingsman: The Golden Circle	13.94	The Foreigner (#2), Logan Lucky (#4), Bushwick (#9)	
41	October 8, 2017	Blade Runner 2049	15.18	The Lego Ninjago Movie (#4), Mr. Omelet (#5), JoJo's Bizarre Adventure: Diamond Is Unbreakable (#6), Paradox (#9)	
42	October 15, 2017	Geostorm	21.78	My Little Pony: The Movie (#2), Victoria & Abdul (#5), Black Full Moon (#6), Tokyo Ghoul (#10)	
43	October 22, 2017	Geostorm	13.19	Flatliners (#2), Wolf Warrior 2 (#5), Leatherface (#7), Breathe (#8), Tell Me How I Die (#10)	
44	October 29, 2017	Geostorm	5.48	—N/a	
45	November 5, 2017	Thor: Ragnarok	92.68	Stronger (#2)	
46	November 12, 2017	Thor: Ragnarok	34.85	Beyond Skyline (#2), Only the Brave (#3), The Big Sick (#4), Colossal (#9)	
47	November 19, 2017	Justice League	64.38	Kodomo Tsukai (#5), Professor Marston and the Wonder Women (#7)	
48	November 26, 2017	Justice League	17.79	Murder on the Orient Express (#2), Happy Death Day (#4), Die Tomorrow (#5), Let Me Eat Your Pancreas (#6), Ajin: Demi-Human (#8), Dries (#9)	
49	December 3, 2017	Coco	12.68	Jigsaw (#4), Jazz the Dog (#5), Daddy's Home 2 (#6), Wind River (#7)	
50	December 10, 2017	Coco	10.50	Renegades (#2), Wonder (#3), Safe Neighborhood (#8)	
51	December 17, 2017	Star Wars: The Last Jedi	54.26	Marrowbone (#6), Call Me by Your Name (#7), Suburbicon (#8)	
52	December 24, 2017	Star Wars: The Last Jedi	16.34	Ferdinand (#3), Pitch Perfect 3 (#4), Jeepers Creepers 3 (#7), Realms (#8), Loving Vincent (#9)	
53	December 31, 2017	Jumanji: Welcome to the Jungle	47.62	Along with the Gods: The Two Worlds (#3), The Greatest Showman (#4), Premika (#5), Fireworks (#6)	

== Highest-grossing films ==
=== In-Year Release ===
International film Thai film

Highest-grossing films of 2017 by In-year release (Only in Bangkok, Metropolitan region and Chiang Mai cinemas)
Rank	Title	Distributor	Gross (฿ million)
1	The Fate of the Furious	United International Pictures	321.96
2	Spider-Man: Homecoming	Sony Pictures Releasing	182.97
3	Thor: Ragnarok	Walt Disney Pictures	182.61
4	Transformers: The Last Knight	United International Pictures	167.02
5	Jumanji: Welcome to the Jungle	Sony Pictures Releasing	141.93
6	Guardians of the Galaxy Vol. 2	Walt Disney Pictures	135.60
7	Pirates of the Caribbean: Dead Men Tell No Tales	Walt Disney Pictures	131.78
8	Beauty and the Beast	Walt Disney Pictures	129.96
9	Justice League	Warner Bros. Pictures	118.14
10	Wonder Woman	Warner Bros. Pictures	117.29

== See also ==
- List of highest-grossing films in Thailand

Preceded by 2016	2017	Succeeded by 2018
