= List of 2019 box office number-one films in Thailand =

This is a list of films which placed number one at the weekend box office for the year 2019 only in Bangkok, Metropolitan region and Chiang Mai, Thailand with the gross in Thai baht.

== Number-one films ==
#	Weekend end date	Film	Gross (฿ million)	Weekend openings in the Top 10	Ref.
1	January 6, 2019	Aquaman	8.43	—N/a	
2	January 13, 2019	Spider-Man: Into the Spider-Verse	21.34	Kursk (#5), Crayon Shin-chan: Burst Serving! Kung Fu Boys ~Ramen Rebellion~ (#7)	
3	January 20, 2019	Glass	13.86	Curses (#3), Beautiful Boy (#10)	
4	January 27, 2019	Glass	4.88	On the Basis of Sex (#4), Molum Mania (#6)	
5	February 3, 2019	How to Train Your Dragon: The Hidden World	55.85	Escape Room (#2), London Sweeties (#3), Sunny: Our Hearts Beat Together (#10)	
6	February 10, 2019	How to Train Your Dragon: The Hidden World	17.68	The Lego Movie 2: The Second Part (#2), The Knight of Shadows: Between Yin and Yang (#3), Replicas (#4), Door Lock (#7), The Extraordinary Journey of the Fakir (#10)	
7	February 17, 2019	Friend Zone	51.89	Alita: Battle Angel (#2)	
8	February 24, 2019	Pee Nak	21.50	The Upside (#4), The Prodigy (#5), The Favourite (#6), The Quake (#7), Happy Death Day 2U (#9), Cafe Funiculi Funicula (#10)	
9	March 3, 2019	Pee Nak	12.66	Fate/stay night: Heaven's Feel II. lost butterfly (#6), Bernie the Dolphin (#10)	
10	March 10, 2019	Captain Marvel	112.82	—N/a	
11	March 17, 2019	Captain Marvel	35.05	Inhuman Kiss (#2), Cold Pursuit (#3), Wonder Park (#4), Nicky Larson et le parfum de Cupidon (#5), Blind (#9)	
12	March 24, 2019	Captain Marvel	13.42	The Kid Who Would Be King (#2), The Possession of Hannah Grace (#4), Captive State (#5), Departures (#8)	
13	March 31, 2019	Dumbo	9.65	Us (#2), It Could Be Him (#5), Greta (#9)	
14	April 7, 2019	Shazam!	32.03	Sisters (#2), A Dog's Way Home (#4), Kamen Rider Heisei Generations Forever (#7), Snow Flower (#10)	
15	April 14, 2019	Hellboy	17.84	Boxing Songkran (#3), Pet Sematary (#4), The Queen's Corgi (#8)	
16	April 21, 2019	The Curse of La Llorona	7.66	Five Feet Apart (#5), Fighting with My Family (#6), Samson (#8)	
17	April 28, 2019	Avengers: Endgame	251.89	Okko's Inn (#5)	
18	May 5, 2019	Avengers: Endgame	87.90	On-Zon-De (#2), UglyDolls (#4), Teen Spirit (#6), Fall in Love at First Kiss (#8), The World Is Yours (#9)	
19	May 12, 2019	Pokémon Detective Pikachu	27.09	The Hustle (#3), Arctic (#5), The Unthinkable (#8), Nha Harn (#9)	
20	May 19, 2019	John Wick: Chapter 3 – Parabellum	63.18	Cinderella and the Secret Prince (#5), Free Solo (#7), Toilet (#10)	
21	May 26, 2019	Aladdin	34.40	Bangkok Dark Tales (#5), Belleville Cop (#7), Nakorn-Sawan (#8)	
22	June 2, 2019	Godzilla: King of the Monsters	47.86	Long Shot (#5), Touken Ranbu (#7), The Dreamers (#9)	
23	June 9, 2019	X-Men: Dark Phoenix	32.86	The Secret Life of Pets 2 (#4), The Hummingbird Project (#9)	
24	June 16, 2019	Men in Black: International	29.96	Polaroid (#6), Remi, Nobody's Boy (#9)	
25	June 23, 2019	Toy Story 4	29.84	Where We Belong (#3), Love Battle (#4), Rocketman (#6), The Real Ghosts (#10)	
26	June 30, 2019	Annabelle Comes Home	25.30	Step Up: Year of The Dance (#4), Back Street Girls: Gokudols (#10)	
27	July 7, 2019	Spider-Man: Far From Home	104.86	—N/a	
28	July 14, 2019	Spider-Man: Far From Home	32.90	Anna (#2), Ma (#4), Every Day a Good Day (#6), Manta Ray (#8), Breaking Habits (#10)	
29	July 21, 2019	The Lion King	40.17	Lucky Priest (#3), The Current War (#4), Little Buddha (#9)	
30	July 28, 2019	The Lion King	22.18	Child's Play (#2), Parasite (#4), The Spirit of Ramayana (#7), A Dog's Journey (#8), Nang Nak (re–release) (#10)	
31	August 4, 2019	Fast & Furious Presents: Hobbs & Shaw	78.59	—N/a	
32	August 11, 2019	Fast & Furious Presents: Hobbs & Shaw	26.70	Dora and the Lost City of Gold (#2), Detective Conan: The Fist of Blue Sapphire (#3), Scary Stories to Tell in the Dark (#4), Bring the Soul: The Movie (#5), The Art of Racing in the Rain (#8), I Am Mother (#9)	
33	August 18, 2019	Crawl	20.94	Midsommar (#3), Tee Shot: Ariya Jutanugarn (#5)	
34	August 25, 2019	Angel Has Fallen	18.69	Ready or Not (#2), Brightburn (#4), The Divine Fury (#6)	
35	September 1, 2019	47 Meters Down: Uncaged	9.88	Yesterday (#3), Hugby Ban Bak (#5), Playmobil: The Movie (#9)	
36	September 8, 2019	It Chapter Two	31.45	Weathering with You (#2), Cats and Peachtopia (#6)	
37	September 15, 2019	It Chapter Two	11.97	Once Upon a Time in Hollywood (#2), Good Boys (#4), City Hunter: Shinjuku Private Eyes (#8), Farewell Song (#10)	
38	September 22, 2019	One Piece: Stampede	20.25	Ad Astra (#2), Rambo: Last Blood (#3), Love and Run (#4), Can You Keep a Secret? (#9)	
39	September 29, 2019	One Piece: Stampede	6.01	Abominable (#3), Hustlers (#6), Exit (#7), 0.0 MHz (#8), Brave Father Online: Our Story of Final Fantasy XIV (#10)	
40	October 6, 2019	Joker	52.40	Doraemon: Nobita's Chronicle of the Moon Exploration (#2), The Matrix (re–release) (#6)	
41	October 13, 2019	Joker	24.12	Khun Phaen Begins (#2), Official Secrets (#4)	
42	October 20, 2019	Maleficent: Mistress of Evil	62.45	Ride Your Wave (#5), Liam Gallagher: As It Was (#6)	
43	October 27, 2019	Terminator: Dark Fate	21.69	Bikeman 2 (#3), Metamorphosis (#6), Roger Waters: Us + Them (#8), Papicha (#9)	
44	November 3, 2019	Maleficent: Mistress of Evil	8.58	Zombieland: Double Tap (#3), The Addams Family (#4), Dew (#6), Mary (#8), Judy (#9), The Exchange (#10)	
45	November 10, 2019	Midway	11.23	Doctor Sleep (#2), Little Monsters (#8)	
46	November 17, 2019	Necromancer 2020	12.39	Gemini Man (#2), Jade Dynasty (#3), Code Geass Lelouch of the Re;surrection (#7)	
47	November 24, 2019	Frozen 2	52.88	The Cave (#2), Countdown (#5), The One You Love (#10)	
48	December 1, 2019	Frozen 2	28.88	Charlie's Angels (#2), The Protector (#3), 21 Bridges (#5), Hello World (#6), Light of My Life (#10)	
49	December 8, 2019	Tootsies & The Fake	65.09	Ford v Ferrari (#3), Ne Zha (#4)	
50	December 15, 2019	Tootsies & The Fake	21.34	Knives Out (#2), Heartbeat (#3), Last Christmas (#5), The Angry Birds Movie 2 (#7), Violet Evergarden: Eternity and the Auto Memory Doll (#9)	
51	December 22, 2019	Star Wars: The Rise of Skywalker	49.71	Black Christmas (#8), The Farewell (#9)	
52	December 29, 2019	Jumanji: The Next Level	32.07	Happy Old Year (#2), Cats (#7)	

== Highest-grossing films ==
=== In-Year Release ===
International film Thai film

Highest-grossing films of 2019 by In-year release (Only in Bangkok, Metropolitan region and Chiang Mai cinemas)
Rank	Title	Distributor	Gross (฿ million)
1	Avengers: Endgame	Walt Disney Pictures	617.55
2	Captain Marvel	Walt Disney Pictures	260.78
3	Spider-Man: Far From Home	Sony Pictures Releasing	238.99
4	Fast & Furious Presents: Hobbs & Shaw	United International Pictures	172.79
5	Maleficent: Mistress of Evil	Walt Disney Pictures	152.25
6	Tootsies & The Fake	GDH	140.02
7	Friend Zone	GDH	134.15
8	Frozen 2	Walt Disney Pictures	129.71
9	John Wick: Chapter 3 – Parabellum	Mongkol Major	120.14
10	Joker	Warner Bros. Pictures	119.11

== See also ==
- List of highest-grossing films in Thailand

Preceded by 2018	2019	Succeeded by 2020
