= List of 2015 box office number-one films in Thailand =

This is a list of films which placed number one at the weekend box office for the year 2015 only in Bangkok, Metropolitan region and Chiang Mai, Thailand with the gross in Thai baht.

== Number-one films ==
| # | Weekend end date | Film | Gross (฿ million) | Weekend openings in the Top 10 | Ref. |
|---|---|---|---|---|---|
| 1 | January 4, 2015 | Seventh Son | 27.3 | Stand by Me Doraemon (#3), Iron Ladies Roar! (#6), The One Ticket (#7) | |
| 2 | January 11, 2015 | Taken 3 | 31.0 | Frozen (Sing-Along Edition) (#9) | |
| 3 | January 18, 2015 | Into the Woods | 14.3 | Blackhat (#3), Wolves (#7), The Water Diviner (#10) | |
| 4 | January 25, 2015 | American Sniper | 13.1 | Mortdecai (#2), Keep Running! Sir Yes Sir! (#4), The Woman in Black: Angel of Death (#7), Dumb and Dumber To (#8) | |
| 5 | February 1, 2015 | The Imitation Game | 8.0 | Tracers (#3), Project Almanac (#5), Gangnam Blues (#8), Under the Mask (#9) | |
| 6 | February 8, 2015 | Jupiter Ascending | 19.5 | Single Lady (#2), The Theory of Everything (#5), The Rewrite (#8), Gallows Hill (#9), Comet (#10) | |
| 7 | February 15, 2015 | Fifty Shades of Grey | 17.3 | Kingsman: The Secret Service (#2), Still Alice (#8), Playing It Cool (#9), The Thesis (#10) | |
| 8 | February 22, 2015 | Dragon Blade | 12.0 | Penguins of Madagascar (#3), Wild Card (#5), Unbroken (#7), Birdman or (The Unexpected Virtue of Ignorance) (#8), Song One (#10) | |
| 9 | March 1, 2015 | The Last: Naruto the Movie | 5.3 | Focus (#3), Predestination (#6), The Lazarus Effect (#9), Rise of the Legend (#10) | |
| 10 | March 8, 2015 | Chappie | 14.5 | Cat A Wabb (#2), Make Me Shudder 3 (#3) | |
| 11 | March 15, 2015 | Cinderella | 36.2 | Run All Night (#2), Superfast! (#4), Everly (#9) | |
| 12 | March 22, 2015 | The Divergent Series: Insurgent | 30.9 | Back to the 90s (#3), Zhong Kui: Snow Girl and the Dark Crystal (#5), Lupin the 3rd (#10) | |
| 13 | March 29, 2015 | The Divergent Series: Insurgent | 13.0 | Robot Overlords (#2), Home (#4), Paddington (#5), Citizenfour (#7), X+Y (#8) | |
| 14 | April 5, 2015 | Furious 7 | 147.0 | Ode to My Father (#9) | |
| 15 | April 12, 2015 | Furious 7 | 51.0 | The Legend of King Naresuan 6 (#2), The SpongeBob Movie: Sponge Out of Water (#3), Little Forest: Summer/Autumn (#8) | |
| 16 | April 19, 2015 | The Legend of King Naresuan 6 | 23.0 | Big Game (#3), Demonic (#5), Child 44 (#6), When Marnie Was There (#7), Boychoir (#8), Woman in Gold (#9) | |
| 17 | April 26, 2015 | Furious 7 | 7.4 | The Age of Adaline (#3), Skin Trade (#4), Love Is (#9), 108 Demon Kings (#10) | |
| 18 | May 3, 2015 | Avengers: Age of Ultron | 132.8 | —N/a | |
| 19 | May 10, 2015 | Avengers: Age of Ultron | 45.0 | Parasyte: Part 1 (#2), Foosball (#5), The Last Five Years (#7), Postcard From Nowhere (#8) | |
| 20 | May 17, 2015 | Mad Max: Fury Road | 22.0 | The Black Death (#3), Pitch Perfect 2 (#4), Lost River (#8) | |
| 21 | May 24, 2015 | Tomorrowland | 23.2 | Miss Happy (#3), Unfriended (#4), Dragon Ball Z: Resurrection 'F' (#8), Song of the Sea (#9), A Little Chaos (#10) | |
| 22 | May 31, 2015 | San Andreas | 38.0 | Yes or No 2.5 (#5), Khuatho (#7) | |
| 23 | June 7, 2015 | Spy | 17.0 | Cha-lui: Lost in Seoul (#5), Extraterrestrial (#8) | |
| 24 | June 14, 2015 | Jurassic World | 127.6 | A Matter of Taste (#4), La Famille Bélier (#5) | |
| 25 | June 21, 2015 | Jurassic World | 61.6 | Survivor (#2), Insidious: Chapter 3 (#3), Monsters: Dark Continent (#5), The Loft (#6), Little Forest: Winter/Spring (#8), Love & Mercy (#9) | |
| 26 | June 28, 2015 | Jurassic World | 27.3 | Barely Lethal (#2), It Follows (#5), Maggie (#6), Lovesucks (#9) | |
| 27 | July 5, 2015 | Terminator Genisys | 52.3 | The Wolfpack (#5), The Trials of Cate McCall (#6) | |
| 28 | July 12, 2015 | Minions | 61.5 | Magic Mike XXL (#3), F.Hilaire (#5), Danny Collins (#6) | |
| 29 | July 19, 2015 | Ant-Man | 45.5 | Kidnapping Freddy Heineken (#4), How to Win at Checkers (Every Time) (#7) | |
| 30 | July 26, 2015 | Ant-Man | 22.7 | Love You 100K (#2), Ted 2 (#3), Southpaw (#5), Poltergeist (#6), Red Wine in the Dark Night (#7), Latitude 6 (#9) | |
| 31 | August 2, 2015 | Mission: Impossible – Rogue Nation | 70.6 | There's Something About Tott (#5) | |
| 32 | August 9, 2015 | Fantastic Four | 23.0 | Dark Places (#5), Jo The Social Network Spy (#9), The Blue Hour (#10) | |
| 33 | August 16, 2015 | Inside Out | 15.6 | The Man from U.N.C.L.E. (#3), Parasyte: Part 2 (#5), Monster Hunt (#6), Our Little Sister (#8), The Diabolical (#9) | |
| 34 | August 23, 2015 | Hitman: Agent 47 | 18.0 | Pixels (#3), Love's Coming 2 (#8), Exeter (#10) | |
| 35 | August 30, 2015 | Attack on Titan: Part I | 12.7 | Love H2O (#5), Absolutely Anything (#6), Paper Towns (#7), Amy (#10) | |
| 36 | September 6, 2015 | Heart Attack | 46.9 | The Transporter Refueled (#2) | |
| 37 | September 13, 2015 | Heart Attack | 14.8 | Self/less (#3), No Escape (#4), SPL II: A Time for Consequences (#5), The Shamer's Daughter (#7) | |
| 38 | September 20, 2015 | Maze Runner: The Scorch Trials | 45.0 | Mae Bia (#2) | |
| 39 | September 27, 2015 | Maze Runner: The Scorch Trials | 18.5 | Everest (#2), Boruto: Naruto the Movie (#4), Cooties (#5), Pawn Sacrifice (#8), The Green Inferno (#9), Siam Yuth: The Dawn of the Kingdom (#10) | |
| 40 | October 4, 2015 | May Who? | 22.3 | The Martian (#2), Hotel Transylvania 2 (#3), Attack on Titan: The Movie - Part 2: End of the World (#4), | |
| 41 | October 11, 2015 | Pan | 16.0 | Sicario (#5), Pokémon the Movie: Hoopa and the Clash of Ages (#7), Sinister 2 (#8) | |
| 42 | October 18, 2015 | Karma | 15.7 | The Intern (#5), The Walk (#6), Crimson Peak (#7), Detective Conan: Sunflowers of Inferno (#8) | |
| 43 | October 25, 2015 | The Last Witch Hunter | 31.5 | Hor Taew Tak 5 (#3), The Little Prince (#5), Bridge of Spies (#6) | |
| 44 | November 1, 2015 | The Last Witch Hunter | 12.7 | Love Arumirai (#2), Ghost Ship (#3), Scouts Guide to the Zombie Apocalypse (#8), Lady of the Dynasty (#10) | |
| 45 | November 8, 2015 | Spectre | 56.8 | —N/a | |
| 46 | November 15, 2015 | Spectre | 22.1 | American Ultra (#2), The 33 (#3), The Gift (#4), Tiger Woman (#5), Love Next Door 2 (#10) | |
| 47 | November 22, 2015 | The Hunger Games: Mockingjay – Part 2 | 50.6 | The Lobster (#3) | |
| 48 | November 29, 2015 | The Hunger Games: Mockingjay – Part 2 | 17.1 | The Good Dinosaur (#2), Momentum (#5), Knock Knock (#6), Kill Your Friends (#7), By the Sea (#8), Gayby Baby (#10) | |
| 49 | December 6, 2015 | In the Heart of the Sea | 11.7 | Senior (#2), Khun Thongdang The Inspirations (#3), Krampus (#6), Suffragette (#10) | |
| 50 | December 13, 2015 | Point Break | 23.0 | The New Adventures of Aladdin (#7), Crayon Shin-chan: Intense Battle! Robo Dad Strikes Back (#8) | |
| 51 | December 20, 2015 | Star Wars: The Force Awakens | 58.9 | Fathers and Daughters (#7), Irrational Man (#8) | |
| 52 | December 27, 2015 | Star Wars: The Force Awakens | 25.9 | Goosebumps (#2), Love the Coopers (#4) | |

== Highest-grossing films ==
=== In-Year Release ===
International film Thai film

Highest-grossing films of 2015 by In-year release (Only in Bangkok, Metropolitan region and Chiang Mai cinemas)
| Rank | Title | Distributor | Gross (฿ million) |
|---|---|---|---|
| 1 | Furious 7 | United International Pictures | 387.85 |
| 2 | Avengers: Age of Ultron | Walt Disney Pictures | 294.77 |
| 3 | Jurassic World | United International Pictures | 290.64 |
| 4 | Star Wars: The Force Awakens | Walt Disney Pictures | 155.62 |
| 5 | Mission: Impossible – Rogue Nation | United International Pictures | 140.11 |
| 6 | Minions | United International Pictures | 116.23 |
| 7 | Spectre | Sony Pictures Releasing | 115.75 |
| 8 | The Legend of King Naresuan 6 | Sahamongkol Film | 115.11 |
| 9 | Ant-Man | Walt Disney Pictures | 113.25 |
| 10 | Terminator Genisys | United International Pictures | 102.36 |

== See also ==
- List of highest-grossing films in Thailand

| Preceded by 2014 | 2015 | Succeeded by 2016 |
