= List of 2020 box office number-one films in Thailand =

This is a list of films which placed number one at the weekend box office for the year 2020 only in Bangkok, Metropolitan region and Chiang Mai, Thailand with the gross in Thai baht.

== Number-one films ==
#	Weekend end date	Film	Gross (฿ million)	Weekend openings in the Top 10	Ref.
1	January 5, 2020	Jumanji: The Next Level	17.06	Happy New You (#3), Primal (#5), Kim Ji-young, Born 1982 (#6)	
2	January 12, 2020	Jumanji: The Next Level	8.08	Ashfall (#2), Spies in Disguise (#3), Little Women (#5), Sodemacom Killer 2 (#6)	
3	January 19, 2020	Dolittle	16.83	Underwater (#2), Kumanthong (#5), Who (#8)	
4	January 26, 2020	Bad Boys for Life	14.01	Ip Man 4: The Finale (#2), Thi-Baan x BNK48 (#3), Dark Waters (#7), Playing with Fire (#9)	
5	February 2, 2020	1917	10.51	The Gentlemen (#4), Secret Zoo (#7), God's Blessing on This Wonderful World! Legend of Crimson (#8), Better Days (#9)	
6	February 9, 2020	Birds of Prey	14.46	Classic Again (#4), Bombshell (#6)	
7	February 16, 2020	Low Season	14.70	The Grudge (#4), The Room (#5), The King's Avatar: For the Glory (#8)	
8	February 23, 2020	Pee Nak 2	16.02	Code 8 (#3), Pain and Glory (#8), Portrait of a Lady on Fire (#10)	
9	March 1, 2020	Sonic the Hedgehog	7.00	The Call of the Wild (#4), Lupin III: The First (#5), The Closet (#6)	
10	March 8, 2020	The Invisible Man	6.35	Onward (#2), Iamhere (#9)	
11	March 15, 2020	Bloodshot	8.09	Brahms: The Boy II (#2), My Spy (#5), Jojo Rabbit (#6), Last Letter (#8), Present Still Perfect (#9)	
There is no box office data on the weekends of March 22 through May 31 due to the COVID-19 pandemic.
23	June 7, 2020	Pojaman The Legacy	2.00	—N/a	
24	June 14, 2020	Pojaman The Legacy	1.11	Baba Yaga: Terror of the Dark Forest (#2), Your Name. (re–release) (#4), Weathering with You (re–release) (#5), Begin Again (re–release) (#6)	
25	June 21, 2020	Fantasy Island	1.25	Guns Akimbo (#2), Emma. (#5), I Still Believe (#6)	
26	June 28, 2020	Morning Glory Love Story	2.06	Trolls World Tour (#2), 32 Malasana Street (#3), Vivarium (#4), The Dark Knight (re–release) (#6), The Dark Knight Rises (re–release) (#8), Batman Begins (re–release) (#9)	
27	July 5, 2020	My Hero Academia: Heroes Rising	3.20	Check-in Shock (#3), Akira (re–release) (#5), Mr. Jones (#6), Achoura (#8)	
28	July 12, 2020	My Hero Academia: Heroes Rising	1.36	Blood Quantum (#3), Kamen Rider Reiwa: The First Generation (#4), Our 30 Minute Sessions (#7)	
29	July 19, 2020	Digimon Adventure: Last Evolution Kizuna	2.84	The Bridge Curse (#2), Train to Busan (re–release) (#4), Rak Kham Khan (#8), John Wick: Chapter 3 – Parabellum (re–release) (#9), The Lost Prince (#10)	
30	July 26, 2020	Train to Busan: Peninsula	19.65	Love Rumble (#2), Eyes On Me: The Movie (#3), Crayon Shin-chan: Honeymoon Hurricane ~The Lost Hiroshi~ (#5), Made in Abyss: Dawn of the Deep Soul (#7), Suk Suk (#8)	
31	August 2, 2020	Train to Busan: Peninsula	8.92	Ava (#2), Rak Na Sup Sup (#6), Sumikko Gurashi the Movie: The Unexpected Picture Book and the Secret Child (#7), Still Human (#8)	
32	August 9, 2020	Train to Busan: Peninsula	3.92	Interstellar (re–release) (#2), White Snake (#3), The Truth (#6), Wet Season (#7)	
33	August 16, 2020	Black Water: Abyss	2.72	Unhinged (#2), Nemesis (#4), Inception (re–release) (#5), The Hunt (#6)	
34	August 23, 2020	Black Water: Abyss	1.14	Intruder (#2), Lingering (#4), The Protector (re–release) (#7), Late Night (#8)	
35	August 30, 2020	Tenet	18.20	The New Mutants (#2), Bring the Soul: The Movie (#3)	
36	September 6, 2020	Mulan	26.38	The Secret Garden (#4)	
37	September 13, 2020	Mulan	13.02	Break the Silence: The Movie (#3), Mother Gamer (#4), The High Note (#5), Special Actors (#8)	
38	September 20, 2020	Mulan	5.21	Antebellum (#3), Ode to Joy (#5)	
39	September 27, 2020	Greenland	8.32	Tesla (#3), Behind You (#5), Love at Second Sight (#7), I Am Woman (#9)	
40	October 4, 2020	Greenland	3.60	Vanguard (#2), Deliver Us from Evil (#5), The Last Full Measure (#6)	
41	October 11, 2020	Greenland	1.72	Love You Koak E-Gerng (#2), The Eight Hundred (#3), The War with Grandpa (#5), The Secrets We Keep (#8), Love You Forever (#9)	
42	October 18, 2020	My God!! Father	2.43	Honest Thief (#2), Ultraman Taiga The Movie: New Generation Climax (#8)	
43	October 25, 2020	The Ghoul: Horror at the Howling Field	4.75	Pinocchio (#2), Fate/stay night: Heaven's Feel III. spring song (#3), Relic (#6)	
44	November 1, 2020	The Ghoul: Horror at the Howling Field	1.75	Cosmoball (#2), The Craft: Legacy (#4), Impetigore (#5), In the Mood for Love (re–release) (#6)	
45	November 8, 2020	The Witches	5.85	Call Me Daddy (#2), The Outpost (#3), Z (#4), Leap (#7), She Dies Tomorrow (#10)	
46	November 15, 2020	The Witches	2.97	The Empty Man (#3), My Rhythm (#6), The Broken Hearts Gallery (#7), Happy Together (re–release) (#8)	
47	November 22, 2020	Riam Fighting Angel	21.09	Doraemon: Nobita's New Dinosaur (#2), Waning Moon (#4), Freaky (#5), Malevolent (#6), Mad Max: Fury Road (re–release) (#10)	
48	November 29, 2020	Riam Fighting Angel	18.70	The Croods: A New Age (#2), Ela Auey (#4), Invasion (#5), Run (#6), Come Away (#7), Fallen Angels (re–release) (#10)	
49	December 6, 2020	The Con-Heartist	19.54	A Mermaid in Paris (#10)	
50	December 13, 2020	Demon Slayer The Movie: Mugen Train	32.28	Ghosts of War (#4), Office Uprising (#7), Seeda (#8), 2046 (re–release) (#10)	
51	December 20, 2020	Wonder Woman 1984	35.80	Soul Snatcher (#5), Memories of Murder (re–release) (#7), School Town King (#10)	
52	December 27, 2020	Wonder Woman 1984	9.20	Soul (#2), Please (Her) (#5), A Gift from Bob (#6), Horizon Line (#7), Chungking Express (re–release) (#8), Ammonite (#10)	

== Highest-grossing films ==
=== In-Year Release ===
International film Thai film

Highest-grossing films of 2020 by In-year release (Only in Bangkok, Metropolitan region and Chiang Mai cinemas)
Rank	Title	Distributor	Gross (฿ million)
1	Riam Fighting Angel	M Pictures	76.49
2	Demon Slayer The Movie: Mugen Train	M Pictures	74.27
3	Wonder Woman 1984	Warner Bros. Pictures	65.80
4	Mulan	Walt Disney Pictures	64.64
5	Tenet	Warner Bros. Pictures	59.23
6	The Con-Heartist	GDH	56.49
7	Train to Busan: Peninsula	Mongkol Major	52.77
8	Low Season	Sahamongkol Film	41.30
9	Pee Nak 2	Five Star Production	35.91
10	Birds of Prey	Warner Bros. Pictures	35.66

Highest-grossing films by MOC rating of 2020
G	Demon Slayer The Movie: Mugen Train
13	Riam Fighting Angel
15	Train to Busan: Peninsula
18	Birds of Prey
20	Pain and Glory

== See also ==
- List of highest-grossing films in Thailand

Preceded by 2019	2020	Succeeded by 2021
