= List of 2016 box office number-one films in Thailand =

This is a list of films which placed number one at the weekend box office for the year 2016 only in Bangkok, Metropolitan region and Chiang Mai, Thailand with the gross in Thai baht.

== Number-one films ==
#	Weekend end date	Film	Gross (฿ million)	Weekend openings in the Top 10	Ref.
1	January 3, 2016	Star Wars: The Force Awakens	18.3	Pantai Norasingha (#2), The Peanuts Movie (#4), Daddy's Home (#5), Snap (#6), Barcelona Christmas Night (#8)	
2	January 10, 2016	Star Wars: The Force Awakens	6.9	The Hateful Eight (#3), The Big Short (#5), The Dressmaker (#6), Crayon Shin-chan: My Moving Story! Cactus Large Attack! (#10)	
3	January 17, 2016	The 5th Wave	16.3	Ip Man 3 (#2), Spotlight (#4)	
4	January 24, 2016	Grace	10.0	Steve Jobs (#4), The Dwarves Must Be Crazy (#6)	
5	January 31, 2016	The Boy	12.8	13 Hours: The Secret Soldiers of Benghazi (#2), The Finest Hours (#3), The Danish Girl (#7), Teacher and Stray Cat (#9), Exposed (#10)	
6	February 7, 2016	The Revenant	9.0	The Monkey King 2 (#2), Pride and Prejudice and Zombies (#3), Dirty Grandpa (#8), Extraction (#9), Room (#10)	
7	February 14, 2016	Deadpool	81.0	Love Beat (#4), Carol (#7), The Choice (#10)	
8	February 21, 2016	Deadpool	26.0	Zoolander 2 (#2), Concussion (#3), Joy (#6), Legend (#9)	
9	February 28, 2016	Gods of Egypt	50.4	Zootopia (#2), Monkey Twins (#8), Son of Saul (#9), Anomalisa (#10)	
10	March 6, 2016	London Has Fallen	25.1	Hail, Caesar! (#8), Love Say Hey (#9), Mojin: The Lost Legend (#10)	
11	March 13, 2016	The Divergent Series: Allegiant	23.0	Kung Fu Panda 3 (#2), The Hunting Ground (#7)	
12	March 20, 2016	The Divergent Series: Allegiant	11.0	13 Secrets (#5), Friend Request (#7), Ride Along 2 (#8), Triple 9 (#9), Jane Got a Gun (#10)	
13	March 27, 2016	Batman v Superman: Dawn of Justice	80.0	Risen (#6)	
14	April 3, 2016	Batman v Superman: Dawn of Justice	24.5	Ghost Is All Around (#2), 10 Cloverfield Lane (#3), My Big Fat Greek Wedding 2 (#4), All Things Must Pass: The Rise and Fall of Tower Records (#9)	
15	April 10, 2016	Joking Jazz 4G	50.4	The Huntsman: Winter's War (#2), The Himalayas (#10)	
16	April 17, 2016	The Jungle Book	52.1	Take Me Home (#4), The Mermaid (#5), Knight of Cups (#10)	
17	April 24, 2016	The Jungle Book	26.1	Hardcore Henry (#4), The Wave (#5), Before I Wake (#7), Colonia (#8)	
18	May 1, 2016	Captain America: Civil War	131.3	Terra Formars (#4)	
19	May 8, 2016	Captain America: Civil War	50.9	Buppha Rahtree: Haunting In Japan (#2), Neighbors 2: Sorority Rising (#3), Criminal (#4), The Witch (#7), Mother's Day (#8), High-Rise (#9)	
20	May 15, 2016	The Angry Birds Movie	18.8	Equals (#3), The Bodyguard (#7), The Man Who Knew Infinity (#8)	
21	May 22, 2016	X-Men: Apocalypse	68.0	The Crown (#5), Pandemic (#7), Bolshoi Babylon (#10)	
22	May 29, 2016	Warcraft: The Beginning	45.1	Money Monster (#3), If Cats Disappeared from the World (#6), Bastille Day (#7), Fathers (#8)	
23	June 5, 2016	Teenage Mutant Ninja Turtles: Out of the Shadows	28.2	Me Before You (#2), Mr. Right (#8), High Strung (#9)	
24	June 12, 2016	Now You See Me 2	52.8	The Conjuring 2 (#2), Where to Invade Next (#8)	
25	June 19, 2016	Now You See Me 2	20.0	Finding Dory (#2), Central Intelligence (#4), The Nice Guys (#5)	
26	June 26, 2016	Independence Day: Resurgence	51.0	A Hologram for the King (#6), Queen of the Desert (#8)	
27	July 3, 2016	The Legend of Tarzan	29.0	Sing Street (#5), Precious Cargo (#8)	
28	July 10, 2016	The Shallows	17.8	The BFG (#2), Cell (#7), I Am a Hero (#8)	
29	July 17, 2016	Khun Phan	26.1	Ice Age: Collision Course (#2), Ghostbusters (#3), The Purge: Election Year (#4)	
30	July 24, 2016	Star Trek Beyond	25.1	Lights Out (#2), Café Society (#10)	
31	July 31, 2016	Jason Bourne	30.4	The Secret Life of Pets (#3), Midnight University (#4), Big Bang Made the Movie (#6), Bad Moms (#8)	
32	August 7, 2016	Suicide Squad	50.5	—	
33	August 14, 2016	Suicide Squad	19.0	Train to Busan (#2), Alice Through the Looking Glass (#3), Skiptrace (#5), Senses from Siam (#7), Our Kind of Traitor (#8), Nine Lives (#9), The Handmaiden (#10)	
34	August 21, 2016	Train to Busan	17.5	Ben-Hur (#2), Nerve (#5), Deadstock (#9), Sadako vs. Kayako (#10)	
35	August 28, 2016	Mechanic: Resurrection	17.2	Pete's Dragon (#3), One Piece Film: Gold (#4), Grandma (#5), The Neon Demon (#10)	
36	September 4, 2016	One Day	45.5	Abattoir (#8)	
37	September 11, 2016	One Day	23.1	Sully (#2), Shin Godzilla (#3), League of Gods (#4), Kubo and the Two Strings (#5), SMTown: The Stage (#10)	
38	September 18, 2016	Don't Breathe	10.3	Phubao Thibaan 2: E-san New Old Songs (#7), Seoul Station (#9)	
39	September 25, 2016	Don't Breathe	6.6	Bridget Jones's Baby (#2), Storks (#3), Blair Witch (#6), A Chinese Odyssey Part Three (#7), Operation Avalanche (#8), Tsukiji Wonderland (#9)	
40	October 2, 2016	Miss Peregrine's Home for Peculiar Children	23.4	Deepwater Horizon (#2)	
41	October 9, 2016	Fast 888	16.8	Snowden (#4), The Girl on the Train (#5), Masterminds (#6), Yo-kai Watch: The Movie (#10)	
42	October 16, 2016	Max Steel	6.0	The Accountant (#2), The Magnificent Seven (#3), Detective Conan: The Darkest Nightmare (#5), Pokémon the Movie: Volcanion and the Mechanical Marvel (#8)	
43	October 23, 2016	Jack Reacher: Never Go Back	12.5	L.O.R.D: Legend of Ravaging Dynasties (#4), Rudolf the Black Cat (#9)	
44	October 30, 2016	Doctor Strange	56.9	The Nursery (#4)	
45	November 6, 2016	Doctor Strange	24.0	Death Note: Light Up the New World (#2), Haunted School (#3), Ouija: Origin of Evil (#4), The Girl with All the Gifts (#6)	
46	November 13, 2016	Your Name.	22.5	Inferno (#2), From Bangkok to Mandalay (#8), In the Room (#10)	
47	November 20, 2016	Fantastic Beasts and Where to Find Them	70.0	The Warriors Gate (#5), Shut In (#6)	
48	November 27, 2016	Fantastic Beasts and Where to Find Them	28.0	Suddenly Twenty (#2), Trolls (#3), Billy Lynn's Long Halftime Walk (#6), The Disappointments Room (#7)	
49	December 4, 2016	Moana	12.6	A Gift (#3), A Monster Calls (#5), Nocturnal Animals (#8), Bleed for This (#9)	
50	December 11, 2016	Underworld: Blood Wars	26.5	The Light Between Oceans (#7)	
51	December 18, 2016	Rogue One: A Star Wars Story	30.5	Sword Master (#4), Office Christmas Party (#6), Collateral Beauty (#7)	
52	December 25, 2016	Passengers	14.2	Assassin's Creed (#2), Sing (#4), A Street Cat Named Bob (#7), Detective Conan Episode "ONE" (#8)	

== Highest-grossing films ==
=== In-Year Release ===
International film Thai film

Highest-grossing films of 2016 by In-year release (Only in Bangkok, Metropolitan region and Chiang Mai cinemas)
Rank	Title	Distributor	Gross (฿ million)
1	Captain America: Civil War	Walt Disney Pictures	311.2
2	Joking Jazz 4G	M Pictures	166.5
3	Deadpool	20th Century Fox	151.6
4	Fantastic Beasts and Where to Find Them	Warner Bros. Pictures	150.6
5	Batman v Superman: Dawn of Justice	Warner Bros. Pictures	148.2
6	Doctor Strange	Walt Disney Pictures	133.6
7	The Jungle Book	Walt Disney Pictures	132.4
8	X-Men: Apocalypse	20th Century Fox	111.3
9	One Day	GDH	110.9
10	Gods of Egypt	Mongkol Major	107.5

== See also ==
- List of highest-grossing films in Thailand

Preceded by 2015	2016	Succeeded by 2017
