= List of 2018 box office number-one films in Thailand =

This is a list of films which placed number one at the weekend box office for the year 2018 only in Bangkok, Metropolitan region and Chiang Mai, Thailand with the gross in Thai baht.

== Number-one films ==
#	Weekend end date	Film	Gross (฿ million)	Weekend openings in the Top 10	Ref.
1	January 7, 2018	Jumanji: Welcome to the Jungle	21.80	Insidious: The Last Key (#2), 24 Hours to Live (#6)	
2	January 14, 2018	The Legend of Muay Thai: 9 Satra	20.19	The Commuter (#3), Darkest Hour (#6), Faces Places (#10)	
3	January 21, 2018	The Legend of Muay Thai: 9 Satra	10.75	12 Strong (#2), Bleeding Steel (#3), Fate/kaleid liner Prisma Illya: Vow in the Snow (#10)	
4	January 28, 2018	Maze Runner: The Death Cure	44.14	The Post (#4), Haunted Hotel (#7), The Florida Project (#10)	
5	February 4, 2018	Maze Runner: The Death Cure	16.87	Downsizing (#2), The Shape of Water (#3), Samui Song (#5), The Last Recipe (#8)	
6	February 11, 2018	Fifty Shades Freed	12.95	Den of Thieves (#2), No Game No Life: Zero (#6), Sensei! My Teacher (#8), I, Tonya (#9)	
7	February 18, 2018	Black Panther	77.93	Monster Hunt 2 (#3), Malila: The Farewell Flower (#5), Lady Bird (#7)	
8	February 25, 2018	Black Panther	29.04	Thibaan The Series 2.1 (#2), Winchester (#3), All the Money in the World (#4), Guardians of the Tomb (#5), Molly's Game (#6), Phantom Thread (#9)	
9	March 4, 2018	Black Panther	16.53	Red Sparrow (#2), The Monkey King 3 (#3), Death Wish (#5), Destiny: The Tale of Kamakura (#9)	
10	March 11, 2018	Tomb Raider	21.68	Three Billboards Outside Ebbing, Missouri (#6), Satan's Slaves (#7), Pokémon the Movie: I Choose You! (#10)	
11	March 18, 2018	Tomb Raider	9.64	The Hurricane Heist (#2), A Wrinkle in Time (#3), 3AM Aftershock (#4), Monster Family (#6), Earth: One Amazing Day (#8), This is Your Death (#10)	
12	March 25, 2018	Pacific Rim Uprising	52.18	Phubao Thibaan 3: Man & The Company (#5)	
13	April 1, 2018	Ready Player One	32.50	Doraemon the Movie 2017: Great Adventure in the Antarctic Kachi Kochi (#3), Phoo Sao Kha Lor (#5), Slumber (#6), Eric Clapton: Life in 12 Bars (#8)	
14	April 8, 2018	A Quiet Place	20.05	Peter Rabbit (#3), Joking Jazz 5G (#4), 7 Days in Entebbe (#6), Golden Slumber (#9)	
15	April 16, 2018	Rampage	55.62	Midnight Sun (#6), Blockers (#7)	
16	April 22, 2018	Rampage	19.60	Taxi 5 (#3), Cold Skin (#7), Please Stand By (#10)	
17	April 29, 2018	Avengers: Infinity War	171.67	A Fantastic Woman (#4)	
18	May 6, 2018	Avengers: Infinity War	55.42	Hug Paeng (#2), Incident in a Ghostland (#3), Truth or Dare (#4), Sherlock Gnomes (#5), I Kill Giants (#6), Tonight, at Romance Theater (#7), Fate/stay night: Heaven's Feel I. presage flower (#8), Childhood (#10)	
19	May 13, 2018	Brother of the Year	66.76	Anon (#5), Beirut (#6), Free! Take Your Marks (#10)	
20	May 20, 2018	Deadpool 2	54.90	Book Club (#4), God's Own Country (#9)	
21	May 27, 2018	Deadpool 2	15.20	Solo: A Star Wars Story (#2), The Last Heroes (#4), The Strangers: Prey at Night (#6), Love, Simon (#7), Backstabbing for Beginners (#8), Tully (#9)	
22	June 3, 2018	Deadpool 2	6.76	Higher Power (#7), Kids on the Slope (#8), Terminal (#9), China Salesman (#10)	
23	June 10, 2018	Jurassic World: Fallen Kingdom	149.20	—N/a	
24	June 17, 2018	Jurassic World: Fallen Kingdom	54.04	Ocean's 8 (#2), Hereditary (#3), Hotel Artemis (#4), The 8-Year Engagement (#5), Operation Red Sea (#6)	
25	June 24, 2018	Incredibles 2	27.74	Escape Plan 2: Hades (#3), Be with You (#5), Inuyashiki (#7), Disobedience (#8)	
26	July 1, 2018	Incredibles 2	13.71	Sicario: Day of the Soldado (#3), Beyond the Edge (#5), The 400 Bravers (#8), Maquia: When the Promised Flower Blooms (#10)	
27	July 8, 2018	Ant-Man and the Wasp	57.77	American Animals (#7)	
28	July 15, 2018	Skyscraper	18.72	Future World (#4), 50 First Kisses (#6), Animal World (#7)	
29	July 22, 2018	Skyscraper	9.40	Krut: The Himmaphan Warriors (#3), 7 Days (#4), Billionaire Boys Club (#5), When I Get Home, My Wife Always Pretends to Be Dead (#7), Isle of Dogs (#8), Burning (#9)	
30	July 29, 2018	Mission: Impossible – Fallout	71.28	Adrift (#6), The Cured (#7)	
31	August 5, 2018	Mission: Impossible – Fallout	25.11	App War (#2), The Darkest Minds (#3), Detective Conan: Zero the Enforcer (#4), The Spy Who Dumped Me (#5), Shoplifters (#8)	
32	August 12, 2018	The Meg	34.15	Along with the Gods: The Last 49 Days (#3), Christopher Robin (#4), Mamma Mia! Here We Go Again (#6), Hotel Transylvania 3: Summer Vacation (#7)	
33	August 19, 2018	The Meg	14.20	BNK48: Girls Don't Cry (#2), The First Purge (#4)	
34	August 26, 2018	Khun Pan 2	18.94	Crazy Rich Asians (#3), A.X.L. (#4), Searching (#5), Detective Dee: The Four Heavenly Kings (#8)	
35	September 2, 2018	The Equalizer 2	11.45	Mile 22 (#3), Destination Wedding (#10)	
36	September 9, 2018	The Nun	32.30	2,215 (#3), Peppermint (#5), Kin (#8)	
37	September 16, 2018	The Predator	20.64	Papillon (#5), After the Rain (#9)	
38	September 23, 2018	Bikeman	20.57	Alpha (#2), A Simple Favor (#4), Mara (#7), Dark Crimes (#9)	
39	September 30, 2018	The House with a Clock in Its Walls	14.92	The Pool (#3), Final Score (#5), Ghost Stories (#7), McQueen (#10)	
40	October 7, 2018	Johnny English Strikes Again	19.74	Hell Fest (#5), One Cut of the Dead (#6), Monstrum (#7), Luis and the Aliens (#9)	
41	October 14, 2018	Venom	70.00	A Star Is Born (#4), Rolling to You (#10)	
42	October 21, 2018	Nakee 2	73.54	Doraemon: Nobita's Treasure Island (#3), First Man (#4), Pokémon the Movie: The Power of Us (#7), Our House (#8)	
43	October 28, 2018	Homestay	37.49	Hunter Killer (#3)	
44	November 4, 2018	Homestay	10.80	The Nutcracker and the Four Realms (#2), Halloween (#4), Bohemian Rhapsody (#6), Rampant (#7), Norah (#9), Suspiria (#10)	
45	November 11, 2018	The Grinch	5.80	Overlord (#2), The Girl in the Spider's Web (#3), Viral (#9)	
46	November 18, 2018	Fantastic Beasts: The Crimes of Grindelwald	75.78	Burn the Stage: The Movie (#2), Just a Breath Away (#9)	
47	November 25, 2018	Fantastic Beasts: The Crimes of Grindelwald	20.95	Robin Hood (#2), Thibaan The Series 2.2 (#3), Iceman: The Time Traveller (#6), Penguin Highway (#7), The Miracle of Naga Gem (#10)	
48	December 2, 2018	Ralph Breaks the Internet	25.87	My Hero Academia: Two Heroes (#5), Gravity of Love (#6), 211 (#7), The Travelling Cat Chronicles (#9), The Wrath (#10)	
49	December 9, 2018	Mortal Engines	20.76	Hor Taew Tak 6 (#2), Malicious (#9), Gintama 2: Rules are Made to be Broken (#10)	
50	December 16, 2018	Aquaman	93.40	Reside (#3), Second Act (#7), Down a Dark Hall (#9), Ten Years Thailand (#10)	
51	December 23, 2018	Aquaman	44.17	Bumblebee (#2), I Want to Eat Your Pancreas (#5), The Wife (#6)	
52	December 30, 2018	Aquaman	23.56	Khun Bunlue (#3), Dragon Ball Super: Broly (#4), Mary Poppins Returns (#5), Goosebumps 2: Haunted Halloween (#6), Master Z: Ip Man Legacy (#7), Mia and the White Lion (#8), Green Book (#9), Instant Family (#10)	

== Highest-grossing films ==
=== In-Year Release ===
International film Thai film

Highest-grossing films of 2018 by In-year release (Only in Bangkok, Metropolitan region and Chiang Mai cinemas)
Rank	Title	Distributor	Gross (฿ million)
1	Avengers: Infinity War	Walt Disney Pictures	420.89
2	Jurassic World: Fallen Kingdom	United International Pictures	288.88
3	Aquaman	Warner Bros. Pictures	254.09
4	Black Panther	Walt Disney Pictures	199.04
5	Nakee 2	M Pictures	161.19
6	Mission: Impossible – Fallout	United International Pictures	152.01
7	Brother of the Year	GDH	146.45
8	Fantastic Beasts: The Crimes of Grindelwald	Warner Bros. Pictures	138.59
9	Venom	Sony Pictures Releasing	137.31
10	Ant-Man and the Wasp	Walt Disney Pictures	128.74

== See also ==
- List of highest-grossing films in Thailand

Preceded by 2017	2018	Succeeded by 2019
