= List of 2022 box office number-one films in Thailand =

This is a list of films which placed number one at the weekend box office for the year 2022 only in Bangkok, Metropolitan region and Chiang Mai, Thailand with the gross in Thai baht.

== Number-one films ==
#	Weekend end date	Film	Gross (฿ million)	Weekend openings in the Top 10	Ref.
1	January 2, 2022	Spider-Man: No Way Home	44.47	The King's Man (#2), Som Pla Noi (#3), The Addams Family 2 (#6), CODA (#7), A Writer's Odyssey (#8), Jolt (#9)	
2	January 9, 2022	Spider-Man: No Way Home	11.17	My Hero Academia: World Heroes' Mission (#3), Clifford the Big Red Dog (#6), Ghost Mansion (#7), Pig (#9)	
3	January 16, 2022	Spider-Man: No Way Home	4.76	Ghostbusters: Afterlife (#2), Sing 2 (#5), Spencer (#8), Fate/Grand Order: Final Singularity-Grand Temple of Time: Solomon (#9), Till Death (#10)	
4	January 23, 2022	Harry Potter and the Philosopher's Stone (re–release)	10.68	Scream (#3), House of Gucci (#4), Cube (#7), Nightmare Alley (#10)	
5	January 30, 2022	Resident Evil: Welcome to Raccoon City	3.58	Tell the World I Love You (#4), Special Delivery (#8)	
6	February 6, 2022	Moonfall	6.08	The 355 (#5)	
7	February 13, 2022	One for the Road	16.58	Death on the Nile (#2), Gintama: The Very Final (#4), Marry Me (#6), A Man And A Woman (#7), Sing a Bit of Harmony (#8)	
8	February 20, 2022	Uncharted	7.32	Dog (#5), Brave: Gunjyo Senki (#6), The Worst Person in the World (#7), Summer Ghost (#8), King Richard (#9)	
9	February 27, 2022	Uncharted	3.02	Cracked (#3), Blacklight (#4), The Godfather (50th Anniversary re–release) (#6), Misaki no Mayoiga (#10)	
10	March 6, 2022	The Batman	21.96	Memoria (#5), Pompo: The Cinéphile (#7)	
11	March 13, 2022	The Batman	9.93	BTS Permission to Dance on Stage - Seoul: Live Viewing (#2), Thibaan The Series: Moh Pla Wan (#3), The Labyrinth (#5), The Desperate Hour (#6), C'mon C'mon (#9)	
12	March 20, 2022	Pee Nak 3	9.42	Ambulance (#3), It's a Summer Film (#6), Book of Love (#7), Jackass Forever (#8)	
13	March 27, 2022	Haunted Universities 2nd Semester	6.59	Harry Potter and the Chamber of Secrets (re–release) (#3), The Bad Guys (#5), In the Wake (#8)	
14	April 3, 2022	Morbius	10.69	Daeng Phra Khanong (#2), Hide and Seek (#8)	
15	April 10, 2022	Daeng Phra Khanong	3.41	Sonic the Hedgehog 2 (#3), Fast and Feel Love (#4), The Contractor (#6), The Godfather Part II (50th Anniversary re–release) (#9)	
16	April 17, 2022	Fantastic Beasts: The Secrets of Dumbledore	31.34	My True Friends: The Beginning (#10)	
17	April 24, 2022	Fantastic Beasts: The Secrets of Dumbledore	8.62	The Lost City (#2), SLR (#3), Seventeen Power of Love: The Movie (#4)	
18	May 1, 2022	Fantastic Beasts: The Secrets of Dumbledore	4.72	Bug Tangmo (#3), Gold (#7)	
19	May 8, 2022	Doctor Strange in the Multiverse of Madness	86.34	—N/a	
20	May 15, 2022	Doctor Strange in the Multiverse of Madness	31.59	Everything Everywhere All at Once (#2), The Rocket Angels (#3), Seoul Ghost Stories (#4), Six Minutes to Midnight (#6), It's A Flickering Life (#9), The Piano Teacher (re–release) (#10)	
21	May 22, 2022	Doctor Strange in the Multiverse of Madness	11.04	The Unbearable Weight of Massive Talent (#3), Superwho? (#4), What She Likes... (#8)	
22	May 29, 2022	Top Gun: Maverick	24.48	Detective Conan: The Bride of Halloween (#3), PULL-UP Mark Tuan Fan Meeting Live Viewing (#4), What to Do with the Dead Kaiju? (#6), Fireheart (#7)	
23	June 5, 2022	Top Gun: Maverick	21.54	Shark Bait (#4), The Antique Shop (#5), The Last 10 Years (#6), Operation Mincemeat (#7), After Yang (#8), Ultra Galaxy Fight: The Destined Crossroad (#9)	
24	June 12, 2022	Jurassic World Dominion	63.08	Mobile Suit Gundam: Cucuruz Doan's Island (#7)	
25	June 19, 2022	Jurassic World Dominion	23.55	Lightyear (#2), The Roundup (#4), Ox-Head Village (#5), Anchor (#6)	
26	June 26, 2022	Jujutsu Kaisen 0	18.50	Elvis (#3), The Fabric (#6), Broker (#7)	
27	July 3, 2022	Minions: The Rise of Gru	12.43	Monrak Wourchon (#7), Deemo: Memorial Keys (#10)	
28	July 10, 2022	Thor: Love and Thunder	63.42	—N/a	
29	July 17, 2022	Thor: Love and Thunder	23.07	The Black Phone (#3), Fearless Love (#4), Cherry Magic! The Movie (#8), Notre-Dame on Fire (#9), Blue Thermal (#10)	
30	July 24, 2022	Thor: Love and Thunder	8.62	The Witch: Part 2. The Other One (#5), What Did You Eat Yesterday? The Movie (#9)	
31	July 31, 2022	Love Destiny: The Movie	71.93	The Beast Below (#4)	
32	August 7, 2022	Love Destiny: The Movie	28.76	Emergency Declaration (#2), DC League of Super-Pets (#4), Fruits Basket: Prelude (#5)	
33	August 14, 2022	Love Destiny: The Movie	19.36	Bullet Train (#2), Happy Ending (#3), The Way of the Househusband (#8), You Are Not My Mother (#10)	
34	August 21, 2022	Love Destiny: The Movie	6.36	Nope (#2), The Lake (#4), Contorted (#7), The Burning Sea (#10)	
35	August 28, 2022	One Piece Film: Red	31.49	Beast (#3), Downton Abbey: A New Era (#8)	
36	September 4, 2022	One Piece Film: Red	9.13	The Invitation (#3), The World of Killing People (#4), The Up Rank (#5), Hunt (#6), Laal Singh Chaddha (#10)	
37	September 11, 2022	Harry Potter and the Prisoner of Azkaban (re–release)	3.68	Love 101 (#4), Plan 75 (#8), Brahmāstra: Part One – Shiva (#9)	
38	September 18, 2022	Six Characters	1.87	Spider-Man: No Way Home (re–release) (#4), Where the Crawdads Sing (#6), A Banquet (#8)	
39	September 25, 2022	Avatar (re–release)	7.88	Shin Ultraman (#2), The Reef: Stalked (#3), Moloch (#4), Decision to Leave (#7)	
40	October 2, 2022	Dragon Ball Super: Super Hero	3.07	Smile (#2), The Quintessential Quintuplets Movie (#4), Don't Look at the Demon (#5), Hug Chao Eli (#7)	
41	October 9, 2022	Doraemon: Nobita's Little Star Wars 2021	4.19	Harry Potter and the Goblet of Fire (re–release) (#2), Ticket to Paradise (#4), The One Hundred (#5), Amsterdam (#6), Vesper (#9)	
42	October 16, 2022	Faces of Anne	4.85	Halloween Ends (#2), Confidential Assignment 2: International (#4), Evangelion: 3.0+1.0 Thrice Upon a Time (#6), Alive Drift (#9)	
43	October 23, 2022	Black Adam	27.70	My Tempo (#5)	
44	October 30, 2022	Black Adam	11.49	OMG! Oh My Girl (#2), Prey for the Devil (#3), Coldplay – Music of the Spheres: Live Broadcast from Buenos Aires (#5), Hot Blooded (#9)	
45	November 6, 2022	Black Adam	5.16	Project Wolf Hunting (#3), Triangle of Sadness (#4), Nocebo (#6), Bros (#7), Teasing Master Takagi-san: The Movie (#9)	
46	November 13, 2022	Black Panther: Wakanda Forever	62.54	Confession (#5), Uunchai (#7)	
47	November 20, 2022	Black Panther: Wakanda Forever	23.25	The Menu (#2), Even If This Love Disappears From the World Tonight (#4), Speak No Evil (#6), Remember (#7), Toxic (#8), The Blue Skies at Your Feet (#9)	
48	November 27, 2022	Bua Pan: Beauty and the Blade	8.99	Strange World (#3), The Cheese Sisters (#5), Jeepers Creepers: Reborn (#6), Bones and All (#9)	
49	December 4, 2022	NCT Dream The Movie: In A Dream	10.86	Sword Art Online Progressive: Scherzo of Deep Night (#4), Violent Night (#5), Decibel (#6), Three Thousand Years of Longing (#7), 777 Charlie (#10)	
50	December 11, 2022	Black Panther: Wakanda Forever	2.43	The Lair (#4), Top Gun: Maverick (re–release) (#6), Hanuman White Monkey: Beginning of the End (#9), Whisper of the Heart (#10)	
51	December 18, 2022	Avatar: The Way of Water	99.91	—N/a	
52	December 25, 2022	Avatar: The Way of Water	59.65	Lyle, Lyle, Crocodile (#2), A Hundred Flowers (#6), Scala (#8)	

== Highest-grossing films ==
=== In-Year Release ===
International film Thai film

Highest-grossing films of 2022 by In-year release (Only in Bangkok, Metropolitan region and Chiang Mai cinemas)
Rank	Title	Distributor	Gross (฿ million)
1	Avatar: The Way of Water	Walt Disney Pictures	376.23
2	Doctor Strange in the Multiverse of Madness	Walt Disney Pictures	220.92
3	Love Destiny: The Movie	GDH	167.67
4	Thor: Love and Thunder	Walt Disney Pictures	163.16
5	Black Panther: Wakanda Forever	Walt Disney Pictures	147.90
6	Jurassic World Dominion	United International Pictures	138.07
7	Top Gun: Maverick	United International Pictures	104.40
8	Fantastic Beasts: The Secrets of Dumbledore	Warner Bros. Pictures	77.35
9	Black Adam	Warner Bros. Pictures	68.86
10	One Piece Film: Red	Dream Express (DEX)	56.40

Highest-grossing films by MOC rating of 2022
G	Love Destiny: The Movie
13	Avatar: The Way of Water
15	Haunted Universities 2nd Semester
18	Bullet Train
20	Project Wolf Hunting

== See also ==
- List of highest-grossing films in Thailand

Preceded by 2021	2022	Succeeded by 2023
