= List of 2014 box office number-one films in Thailand =

This is a list of films which placed number one at the weekend box office for the year 2014 only in Bangkok, Metropolitan region and Chiang Mai, Thailand with the gross in Thai baht.

== Number-one films ==
#	Weekend end date	Film	Gross (฿ million)	Weekend openings in the Top 10	Ref.
1	January 5, 2014	47 Ronin	14.3	Free Birds (#8)	
2	January 12, 2014	Cloudy with a Chance of Meatballs 2	7.2	The Parallel (#6), Ultraman Zero: The Revenge of Belial (#7)	
3	January 19, 2014	Jack Ryan: Shadow Recruit	12.1	3 A.M. 3D: Part 2 (#2), 12 Years a Slave (#4), Oldboy (#9)	
4	January 26, 2014	I, Frankenstein	22.0	Firestorm (#4), Jackass Presents: Bad Grandpa (#7), Dallas Buyers Club (#10)	
5	February 2, 2014	I, Frankenstein	12.1	The Wolf of Wall Street (#2), Lone Survivor (#3), 4 Kings (#4), Until Now (#5), Paranormal Activity: The Marked Ones (#6), Badges of Fury (#8)	
6	February 9, 2014	The Legend of Hercules	13.0	Still 2 (#2), Her (#6), Nurse 3D (#9)	
7	February 16, 2014	RoboCop	40.0	Timeline (#2), Endless Love (#7), That Awkward Moment (#8)	
8	February 23, 2014	Pompeii	12.5	The Monuments Men (#4), Saving Mr. Banks (#5), My Bromance (#7)	
9	March 2, 2014	The Monkey King 3D	10.0	3 Days to Kill (#2), She Devil (#7), Open Grave (#9)	
10	March 9, 2014	300: Rise of an Empire	35.0	Mr. Peabody & Sherman (#2)	
11	March 16, 2014	Non-Stop	17.2	The Lego Movie (#3), Vampire Academy (#4), Threesome (#5), Delivery Man (#7)	
12	March 23, 2014	The Teacher's Diary	28.0	Divergent (#2)	
13	March 30, 2014	The Teacher's Diary	21.4	Sabotage (#3), Dhoom 3 (#7), Thanks for Sharing (#8)	
14	April 6, 2014	Captain America: The Winter Soldier	71.3	Tarzan (#4)	
15	April 13, 2014	Noah	27.4	Make Me Shudder 2 (#3), Rio 2 (#4), My Best Years aka Rock Paper Scissors (#6), The Lunchbox (#9)	
16	April 20, 2014	Need for Speed	15.7	Transcendence (#2), My House (#7), Lupin the 3rd vs. Detective Conan: The Movie (#8), Khumba (#10)	
17	April 27, 2014	Brick Mansions	14.0	The Railway Man (#7)	
18	May 4, 2014	The Amazing Spider-Man 2	86.3	—N/a	
19	May 11, 2014	The Amazing Spider-Man 2	26.7	Bad Neighbors (#2), Oculus (#3), 13 Sins (#4), Spirits War (#8)	
20	May 18, 2014	Godzilla	51.6	Haunt (#5), Enemy (#6)	
21	May 25, 2014	X-Men: Days of Future Past	50.5	Draft Day (#5), The Quiet Ones (#6)	
22	June 1, 2014	The Legend of King Naresuan 5	95.3	The Raid: Berandal (#4), Le Week-End (#5)	
23	June 8, 2014	The Legend of King Naresuan 5	35.0	Edge of Tomorrow (#2), Flight 7500 (#4), The Rooms (#6), Sri Thanonchai 555+ (#9)	
24	June 15, 2014	Maleficent	56.0	How to Train Your Dragon 2 (#2), Pob Na Pluak (#5), Spooks in Thailand (#7)	
25	June 22, 2014	Maleficent	29.0	Hong Hoon (#5), Phubao Thibaan E-San Indy (#6), Iceman 3D (#7), Grace of Monaco (#9), Zulu (#10)	
26	June 29, 2014	Transformers: Age of Extinction	128.0	Magic Magic (#10)	
27	July 6, 2014	Transformers: Age of Extinction	61.3	Begin Again (#2), Million Dollar Arm (#6), The Wind Rises (#7), The Last Executioner (#8)	
28	July 13, 2014	Dawn of the Planet of the Apes	38.0	Love Slave (#3), A Million Ways to Die in the West (#5), Earth to Echo (#6)	
29	July 20, 2014	Step Up: All In	25.7	Words and Pictures (#9)	
30	July 27, 2014	Hercules	29.1	Call Me Bad Girl (#2), The Fault in Our Stars (#5), From Vegas to Macau (#8), The Rover (#10)	
31	August 3, 2014	Guardians of the Galaxy	44.3	—N/a	
32	August 10, 2014	The Swimmers	30.0	The Expendables 3 (#3), Into the Storm (#4)	
33	August 17, 2014	The Swimmers	9.5	The Scar (#5), 22 Jump Street (#7)	
34	August 24, 2014	Teenage Mutant Ninja Turtles	30.0	Sin City: A Dame to Kill For (#7), James Cameron's Deep Sea Challenge 3D (#8), Kristy (#10)	
35	August 31, 2014	Lucy	32.0	Chiang Khan Story (#3), Ju-On: The Beginning of the End (#4), What If (#5), Deliver Us from Evil (#8)	
36	September 7, 2014	Lucy	12.5	The November Man (#2), Wer (#7)	
37	September 14, 2014	Lucy	5.4	Sex Tape (#2), Spell (#3), The White Haired Witch of Lunar Kingdom (#6), Kite (#8), Sming (#9)	
38	September 21, 2014	The Maze Runner	34.0	As Above, So Below (#5), Once Upon a Time in Shanghai (#9)	
39	September 28, 2014	The Maze Runner	19.0	A Walk Among the Tombstones (#2), The Purge: Anarchy (#3), Fin Sugoi (#4), Viy (#5)	
40	October 5, 2014	Annabelle	12.0	Planes: Fire & Rescue (#3), Rurouni Kenshin: Kyoto Inferno (#4), Naked Ambition 3D (#8), The Homesman (#10)	
41	October 12, 2014	Autómata	9.3	Dangerous Boys (#2), The Babadook (#3), The Prince (#6), Detective Conan: The Sniper from Another Dimension (#7), The Admiral: Roaring Currents (#10)	
42	October 19, 2014	Dracula Untold	34.0	The Best of Me (#4), Saint Seiya: Legend of Sanctuary (#8)	
43	October 26, 2014	Dracula Untold	13.9	John Wick (#2), Fury (#3), Gone Girl (#4), O.T. Ghost Overtime (#5), Doraemon: New Nobita's Great Demon—Peko and the Exploration Party of Five (#6), Love, Rosie (#9)	
44	November 2, 2014	The Equalizer	8.6	The Eyes Diary (#6), The Couple (#8), Heisei Rider vs. Shōwa Rider: Kamen Rider Taisen feat. Super Sentai (#9), Whiplash (#10)	
45	November 9, 2014	Interstellar	31.7	Namo OK (#3), Rurouni Kenshin: The Legend Ends (#4)	
45	November 16, 2014	Interstellar	22.9	Vengeance of an Assassin (#2), Ouija (#3), Before I Go to Sleep (#4), The Hundred-Foot Journey (#7)	
47	November 23, 2014	The Hunger Games: Mockingjay – Part 1	59.3	Magic in the Moonlight (#7)	
48	November 30, 2014	The Hunger Games: Mockingjay – Part 1	17.7	Horns (#3), 1448 Love Among Us (#5), Saint Laurent (#6), The Return (#7), Summer to Winter (#9), Sur-Real (#10)	
49	December 7, 2014	Big Hero 6	23.3	Exodus: Gods and Kings (#2), App Love (#4)	
50	December 14, 2014	I Fine..Thank You..Love You	99.3	Kill the Messenger (#5), Serena (#7), Young Ones (#8)	
51	December 21, 2014	I Fine..Thank You..Love You	53.9	The Hobbit: The Battle of the Five Armies (#2), Stonehearst Asylum (#5), The Possession of Michael King (#6)	
52	December 28, 2014	I Fine..Thank You..Love You	30.0	Night at the Museum: Secret of the Tomb (#3), Love on the Rocks (#4), Ghost Coins (#6), The Tale of the Princess Kaguya (#8), The Good Lie (#9)	

== Highest-grossing films ==
=== In-Year Release ===
International film Thai film

Highest-grossing films of 2014 by In-year release (Only in Bangkok, Metropolitan region and Chiang Mai cinemas)
Rank	Title	Distributor	Gross (฿ million)
1	I Fine..Thank You..Love You	GTH	330.5
2	Transformers: Age of Extinction	United International Pictures	310.2
3	The Legend of King Naresuan 5	Sahamongkol Film	206.8
4	The Amazing Spider-Man 2	Sony Pictures Releasing	175.2
5	Captain America: The Winter Soldier	Walt Disney Pictures	158.0
6	Maleficent	Walt Disney Pictures	129.0
7	X-Men: Days of Future Past	20th Century Fox	114.0
8	The Hobbit: The Battle of the Five Armies	Warner Bros. Pictures	112.0
9	Guardians of the Galaxy	Walt Disney Pictures	105.5
10	The Hunger Games: Mockingjay – Part 1	Mongkol Major	104.5

== See also ==
- List of highest-grossing films in Thailand

Preceded by 2013	2014	Succeeded by 2015
