= List of 2021 box office number-one films in Thailand =

This is a list of films which placed number one at the weekend box office for the year 2021 only in Bangkok, Metropolitan region and Chiang Mai, Thailand with the gross in Thai baht.

== Number-one films ==
#	Weekend end date	Film	Gross (฿ million)	Weekend openings in the Top 10	Ref.
1	January 3, 2021	Monster Hunter	9.86	Detective Conan: The Scarlet School Trip (#6), Josée (#10)	
There is no box office data on the weekend of January 10.
3	January 17, 2021	Monster Hunter	1.20	Tomorrow I Will Date with Yesterday's You (#8)	
There is no box office data on the weekend of January 24.
5	January 31, 2021	Monster Hunter	0.75	The End of the Storm (#2), Ready Player One (re–release) (#9), The Lighthouse (re–release) (#10)	
6	February 7, 2021	Jiu Jitsu	1.15	Happiest Season (#3), Ideal Home (#7)	
7	February 14, 2021	Shadow in the Cloud	1.64	The Cursed Lesson (#2), I Remember (#4), Endings, Beginnings (#8)	
8	February 21, 2021	Detective Chinatown 3	1.42	Howling Village (#2), The Cornered Mouse Dreams of Cheese (#4), Breaking News in Yuba County (#6)	
9	February 28, 2021	Tom & Jerry	5.42	Skylines (#2), Violet Evergarden: The Movie (#3), Willy's Wonderland (#5)	
10	March 7, 2021	Raya and the Last Dragon	11.88	The Marksman (#2), Boss Level (#3)	
11	March 14, 2021	Raya and the Last Dragon	9.98	Haunted Tales (#2), Chaos Walking (#3), Music (#8), Roohi (#9)	
12	March 21, 2021	Raya and the Last Dragon	5.28	God Bless The Trainees Too! (#2), The Legend of Hei (#5), Pharaoh's War (#6)	
13	March 28, 2021	Godzilla vs. Kong	85.35	Fate/Grand Order The Movie Divine Realm of the Round Table: Camelot Wandering: Agateram (#4), True Mothers (#7)	
14	April 4, 2021	Godzilla vs. Kong	28.48	Detective Conan: The Scarlet Alibi (#2), My Boss is a Serial Killer (#3), Minari (#7), The Mauritanian (#8), The Nightingale (#9)	
15	April 11, 2021	Mortal Kombat	5.20	Stand by Me Doraemon 2 (#3), Come and See (#4), Master Petchtai (#7)	
16	April 18, 2021	Mortal Kombat	3.04	Seo Bok (#2), Nobody (#3), The Courier (#7)	
17	April 25, 2021	Mortal Kombat	0.54	Promising Young Woman (#5), Collectors (#6)	
There is no box office data on the weekends of May 2 through October 17 due to the COVID-19 pandemic.
43	October 24, 2021	Fast & Furious 9	19.76	Dune (#3), Jungle Cruise (#5), Minamata (#7)	
44	October 31, 2021	The Medium	19.20	The Unholy (#7), The Ice Road (#8), The Last Duel (#9), Game Changer (#10)	
45	November 7, 2021	Eternals	37.16	Get Him Girl! (#3), Josee, the Tiger and the Fish (#6), Hitman's Wife's Bodyguard (#9), Midnight (#10)	
46	November 14, 2021	Eternals	13.14	2gether: The Movie (#2), The Misfits (#4), Escape Room: No Way Out (#5), The Green Knight (#10)	
47	November 21, 2021	Eternals	5.72	Don't Breathe 2 (#3), Phu Bao Thai Ban E-Saan Juad (#5), Go Away Mr. Tumor (#7), Spiral (#8), Copshop (#9)	
48	November 28, 2021	Venom: Let There Be Carnage	5.71	Encanto (#2), Halloween Kills (#4), Great White (#5), The Protégé (#6), Escape from Mogadishu (#8), Recalled (#10)	
49	December 5, 2021	Venom: Let There Be Carnage	15.59	Oh My Ghost! The Fierce Escape from Covid-19 (#2), Tokyo Revengers (#4), Om! Crush on Me (#5), Voyagers (#10)	
50	December 12, 2021	4 Kings	18.68	Case Closed: The Scarlet Bullet (#3), Sword Art Online Progressive: Aria of a Starless Night (#4), PAW Patrol: The Movie (#6), Last Night in Soho (#7), West Side Story (#9), Monsta X: The Dreaming (#10)	
51	December 19, 2021	4 Kings	14.25	The Matrix Resurrections (#2), The Boss Baby: Family Business (#5), Son (#10)	
52	December 26, 2021	Spider-Man: No Way Home	112.62	Seance (#7), Crayon Shin-chan: Crash! Graffiti Kingdom and Almost Four Heroes (#8)	

== Highest-grossing films ==
=== In-Year Release ===
International film Thai film

Highest-grossing films of 2021 by In-year release (Only in Bangkok, Metropolitan region and Chiang Mai cinemas)
Rank	Title	Distributor	Gross (฿ million)
1	Spider-Man: No Way Home	Sony Pictures Releasing	239.29
2	Godzilla vs. Kong	Warner Bros. Pictures	177.85
3	Eternals	Walt Disney Pictures	75.01
4	4 Kings	M Pictures	69.82
5	The Medium	GDH	54.04
6	Shang-Chi and the Legend of the Ten Rings	Walt Disney Pictures	44.74
7	Raya and the Last Dragon	Walt Disney Pictures	44.00
8	Venom: Let There Be Carnage	Sony Pictures Releasing	43.97
9	No Time to Die	United International Pictures	41.77
10	Fast & Furious 9	United International Pictures	41.29

Highest-grossing films by MOC rating of 2021
G	Spider-Man: No Way Home
13	Eternals
15	4 Kings
18	The Medium
20	Fidelity

== See also ==
- List of highest-grossing films in Thailand

Preceded by 2020	2021	Succeeded by 2022
