= List of 2013 box office number-one films in Thailand =

This is a list of films which placed number one at the weekend box office for the year 2013 only in Bangkok, Metropolitan region and Chiang Mai, Thailand with the gross in Thai baht.

== Number-one films ==
#	Weekend end date	Film	Gross (฿ million)	Weekend openings in the Top 10	Ref.
1	January 6, 2013	Crazy Crying Lady	18.3	The Guillotines (#7), The Bay (#9)	
2	January 13, 2013	Crazy Crying Lady	11.6	Upside Down (#2), Texas Chainsaw 3D (#3), The Man with the Iron Fists (#4), Gangster Squad (#5)	
3	January 20, 2013	The Last Stand	8.5	Killing Them Softly (#8)	
4	January 27, 2013	Hansel & Gretel: Witch Hunters	27.4	The Last Tycoon (#3), So Undercover (#8)	
5	February 3, 2013	Long Weekend	12.5	Parker (#3), Les Misérables (#4), Zero Dark Thirty (#5)	
6	February 10, 2013	Jan Dara: The Finale	17.2	Bullet to the Head (#6), Lost in Thailand (#7), Mama (#8), Bachelorette (#10)	
7	February 17, 2013	A Good Day to Die Hard	30.2	Warm Bodies (#2), Choice (#4), Safe Haven (#7)	
8	February 24, 2013	A Good Day to Die Hard	11.9	Beautiful Creatures (#2), Snitch (#4), Flight (#5), Silver Linings Playbook (#8)	
9	March 3, 2013	Jack the Giant Slayer	32.3	Stoker (#6), Gambit (#9)	
10	March 10, 2013	Oz the Great and Powerful	24.8	Panya Raenu 3: Lost in India (#3), The Grandmaster (#4), 21 & Over (#5), Cirque du Soleil: Worlds Away (#9)	
11	March 17, 2013	Oz the Great and Powerful	13.2	The Haunting in Connecticut 2: Ghosts of Georgia (#3), Django Unchained (#4), Suddenly It's Magic (#7), Side Effects (#9)	
12	March 24, 2013	Olympus Has Fallen	14.9	OOO, Den-O, All Riders: Let's Go Kamen Riders (#4), Movie 43 (#6)	
13	March 31, 2013	Pee Mak	105.9	G.I. Joe: Retaliation (#2), Lincoln (#4), The Croods (#7)	
14	April 7, 2013	Pee Mak	91.1	Sunset at Chaophraya (#2), The Host (#5)	
15	April 14, 2013	Pee Mak	70.9	Oblivion (#2), The Last Exorcism Part II (#7), A Turtle's Tale 2: Sammy's Escape from Paradise (#8), Vamps (#9)	
16	April 21, 2013	Pee Mak	45.6	Grean Fictions (#3), Scary Movie 5 (#4), Road to Ninja: Naruto the Movie (#6), Bodyslam Nanglen (#7), Penthouse North (#10)	
17	April 28, 2013	Pee Mak	25.8	One Piece Film: Z (#2), The Expatriate (#4), The Place Beyond the Pines (#7)	
18	May 5, 2013	Iron Man 3	104.3	—N/a	
19	May 12, 2013	Iron Man 3	34.5	Star Trek Into Darkness (#2), Love in the Rain (#3), Evil Dead (#5), Welcome to the Punch (#6), 3096 Days (#7)	
20	May 19, 2013	Star Trek Into Darkness	13.1	The Great Gatsby (#4), Rurouni Kenshin (#7), Dead Man Down (#8)	
21	May 26, 2013	Fast & Furious 6	106.7	Epic (#2), Crush (#8)	
22	June 2, 2013	Fast & Furious 6	38.7	Now You See Me (#2), The Hangover Part III (#3), Jurassic Park 3D (#4), Young Bao The Movie (#5), Aftershock (#7)	
23	June 9, 2013	After Earth	24.7	Hummingbird (#5), Angels (#7), The Call (#10)	
24	June 16, 2013	Man of Steel	50.1	The Barrens (#8), The Silent War (#9), True Love (#10)	
25	June 23, 2013	World War Z	47.3	Mud (#6)	
26	June 30, 2013	World War Z	22.4	Last Summer (#2), Odd Thomas (#5), Journey to the West: Conquering the Demons (#6), Huk Aum Lum (#8), Paradoxocracy (#9)	
27	July 7, 2013	Despicable Me 2	21.1	The Lone Ranger (#2), The Cop (#7)	
28	July 14, 2013	Pacific Rim	52.0	Byzantium (#5), Arthur Newman (#9)	
29	July 21, 2013	Pacific Rim	22.5	Red 2 (#2), Turbo (#4), Man of Tai Chi (#5), Only God Forgives (#6), Kamen Rider × Super Sentai × Space Sheriff: Super Hero Taisen Z (#8), Present Perfect Continuous Tense (#9)	
30	July 28, 2013	The Wolverine	39.8	I'm So Excited! (#8), My Sweet Orange Tree (#9)	
31	August 4, 2013	Monsters University	19.3	2 Guns (#3), Mr. Go (#4), Pawnshop (#6)	
32	August 11, 2013	Yam Yasothon 3	24.2	R.I.P.D. (#2), The Purge (#7), The Big Wedding (#8)	
33	August 18, 2013	Percy Jackson: Sea of Monsters	36.9	Saving General Yang (#6), The To Do List (#8), Evangelion: 3.0 You Can (Not) Redo (#10)	
34	August 25, 2013	The Mortal Instruments: City of Bones	20.5	The Conjuring (#3), Kick-Ass 2 (#4), The Second Sight 3D (#5)	
35	September 1, 2013	White House Down	25.9	Make Your Move (#7), Vehicle 19 (#9), Tang Wong (#10)	
36	September 8, 2013	Riddick	29.2	The Bling Ring (#5), Switch (#7), Closed Circuit (#8), The Man Who Laughs (#9)	
37	September 15, 2013	Riddick	11.3	Jobs (#2), Pain & Gain (#4), First Love (#5), Sadako 3D (#6)	
38	September 22, 2013	Elysium	24.5	Diana (#4), You're Next (#5)	
39	September 29, 2013	Elysium	11.7	Rush (#2), Runner Runner (#3), The Heat (#9)	
40	October 6, 2013	Make Me Shudder	15.7	Gravity (#2), The Smurfs 2 (#3), Prisoners (#4)	
41	October 13, 2013	Gravity	9.3	About Time (#3), Insidious: Chapter 2 (#5), Love Syndrome (#6), Detective Conan: Private Eye in the Distant Sea (#7), Lee Daniels' The Butler (#10)	
42	October 20, 2013	Escape Plan	17.8	Doraemon: Nobita's Secret Gadget Museum (#2), Vikingdom (#7), Coffee Please (#9)	
43	October 27, 2013	Tom Yum Goong 2	21.1	Planes (#3), Dragon Ball Z: Battle of Gods (#7)	
44	November 3, 2013	Hashima Project	20.2	Ender's Game (#2), Spiders 3D (#8)	
45	November 10, 2013	Thor: The Dark World	72.0	—N/a	
45	November 17, 2013	Thor: The Dark World	26.6	Malavita (#2), Grown Ups 2 (#3), Possessed (#4), Lovelace (#7)	
47	November 24, 2013	The Hunger Games: Catching Fire	50.6	The Counselor (#3)	
48	December 1, 2013	The Hunger Games: Catching Fire	19.7	Oh My Ghost (#2), Looktung Millionaire (#3), Carrie (#4), Don Jon (#7), Evidence (#8), The World's End (#9), Mary Is Happy, Mary Is Happy (#10)	
49	December 8, 2013	Frozen	14.2	Snowpiercer (#2), Young Detective Dee: Rise of the Sea Dragon (#6), Romeo & Juliet (#7), Like Father, Like Son (#10)	
50	December 15, 2013	The Hobbit: The Desolation of Smaug	48.0	Empire State (#3), Battle of the Year (#6)	
51	December 22, 2013	The Hobbit: The Desolation of Smaug	18.0	American Hustle (#3), Last Vegas (#4), Captain Phillips (#5), Homefront (#6), Journey to the Christmas Star (#9)	
52	December 29, 2013	47 Ronin	24.7	Love Sick (#2), Walking with Dinosaurs 3D (#4), Police Story 2013 (#5), The Secret Life of Walter Mitty (#8)	

== Highest-grossing films ==
=== In-Year Release ===
International film Thai film

Highest-grossing films of 2013 by In-year release (Only in Bangkok, Metropolitan region and Chiang Mai cinemas)
Rank	Title	Distributor	Gross (฿ million)
1	Pee Mak	GTH	568.5
2	Iron Man 3	Walt Disney Pictures	262.9
3	Fast & Furious 6	United International Pictures	213.7
4	Thor: The Dark World	Walt Disney Pictures	142.3
5	Pacific Rim	Warner Bros. Pictures	117.0
6	G.I. Joe: Retaliation	United International Pictures	115.2
7	The Hunger Games: Catching Fire	Mongkol Major	106.6
8	World War Z	United International Pictures	104.8
9	The Hobbit: The Desolation of Smaug	Warner Bros. Pictures	104.5
10	Man of Steel	Warner Bros. Pictures	96.0

== See also ==
- List of highest-grossing films in Thailand

Preceded by 2012	2013	Succeeded by 2014
