= List of highest-grossing films in Thailand =

The following is a list of the highest-grossing films in Thailand. This list only accounts for the films' box office earnings in Bangkok, Metropolitan region and Chiang Mai cinemas with the gross in Thai baht and not their ancillary revenues (i.e. home video sales, video rentals, television broadcasts, or merchandise sales).

== Highest-grossing films ==
† Background shading indicates films playing on 16 November 2026 in Thai theaters.

Highest-grossing films (Only in Bangkok, Metropolitan region and Chiang Mai cinemas)
Rank	Peak	Title	Distributor	Gross (฿ million)	Year	Ref
1	1	Avengers: Endgame	Walt Disney Pictures	617.55	2019	
2	1	Pee Mak	GTH	568.55	2013	
3	2	Avengers: Infinity War	Walt Disney Pictures	420.89	2018	
4	2	Furious 7	United International Pictures	387.85	2015	
5	5	Avatar: The Way of Water	Walt Disney Pictures	376.23	2022	
6	2	I Fine..Thank You..Love You	GTH	330.55	2014	
7	1	The Legend of Suriyothai	Sahamongkol Film	324.5^{R}	2001	
8	5	The Fate of the Furious	United International Pictures	321.96	2017	
9	5	Captain America: Civil War	Walt Disney Pictures	311.21	2016	
10	3	Transformers: Age of Extinction	United International Pictures	310.23	2014	
11	2	Avatar	20th Century Fox	303	2009	
12	7	Avengers: Age of Ultron	Walt Disney Pictures	294.77	2015	
13	3	Transformers: Dark of the Moon	United International Pictures	291.20	2011	
14	9	Jurassic World	United International Pictures	290.64	2015	
15	13	Jurassic World: Fallen Kingdom	United International Pictures	288.88	2018	
16	16	Death Whisperer 2	M Studio	286.08	2024	
17	17	Spider-Man: Brand New Day	Sony Pictures Releasing	277.76	2026	
18	17	Avatar: Fire and Ash	Walt Disney Pictures	272.82	2025	
19	5	Iron Man 3	Walt Disney Pictures	262.92	2013	
20	15	Captain Marvel	Walt Disney Pictures	260.78	2019	
21	15	Aquaman	Warner Bros. Pictures	254.09	2018	
22	4	The Avengers	Walt Disney Pictures	252.16	2012	
23	20	The Undertaker	Taibaan Studio	245.10	2023	
24	19	Spider-Man: No Way Home	Sony Pictures Releasing	239.29	2021	
25	19	Spider-Man: Far From Home	Sony Pictures Releasing	238.99	2019	
26	4	Harry Potter and the Deathly Hallows – Part 2	Warner Bros. Pictures	236.23	2011	
27	22	Doctor Strange in the Multiverse of Madness	Walt Disney Pictures	221.00	2022	
28	2	The Legend of King Naresuan 1	Sahamongkol Film	219.06	2007	
29	3	The Legend of King Naresuan 2	Sahamongkol Film	216.87	2007	
30	4	2012	Columbia TriStar	214.98	2009	
31	11	Fast & Furious 6	United International Pictures	213.72	2013	
32	1	Titanic	20th Century Fox	213.65	1997	
33	13	The Legend of King Naresuan 5	Sahamongkol Film	206.86	2014	
34	5	Transformers: Revenge of the Fallen	United International Pictures	201.60	2009	
35	8	The Legend of King Naresuan 3	Sahamongkol Film	201.08	2011	
36	23	Black Panther	Walt Disney Pictures	199.04	2018	
37	34	Death Whisperer	M Studio	198.70	2023	
38	38	The Odyssey	United International Pictures	198.45	2026	
39	3	Harry Potter and the Goblet of Fire	Warner Bros. Pictures	190.86	2005	
40	13	The Twilight Saga: Breaking Dawn – Part 2	Mongkol Major	189.93	2012	
41	3	The Lord of the Rings: The Return of the King	Mongkol Major	184.63	2003	
42	4	Tom-Yum-Goong	Sahamongkol Film	183.35	2005	
43	25	Spider-Man: Homecoming	Sony Pictures Releasing	182.97	2017	
44	26	Thor: Ragnarok	Walt Disney Pictures	182.61	2017	
45	8	Spider-Man 3	Columbia TriStar	179.30	2007	
46	44	Demon Slayer The Movie: Infinity Castle	Sony Pictures Releasing	175.6^{D}	2025	
47	20	The Amazing Spider-Man 2	Sony Pictures Releasing	175.22	2014	
48	38	Hobbs & Shaw	United International Pictures	172.79	2019	
49	44	How to Make Millions Before Grandma Dies	GDH	172.70	2024	
50	12	Harry Potter and the Deathly Hallows – Part 1	Warner Bros. Pictures	171.40	2010	

^{R}The gross for The Legend of Suriyothai includes the original release in 2001 and the extended edition release in 2003.

^{D}The gross for Demon Slayer The Movie: Infinity Castle includes the original release in 2025 and the ScreenX format edition release in 2026.

== Highest-grossing domestic films ==
† Background shading indicates films playing on 16 November 2026 in Thai theaters.

Highest-grossing domestic films (Only in Bangkok, Metropolitan region and Chiang Mai cinemas)
Rank	Peak	Title	Distributor	Gross (฿ million)	Year	Ref
1	1	Pee Mak	GTH	568.55	2013	
2	2	I Fine..Thank You..Love You	GTH	330.55	2014	
3	1	The Legend of Suriyothai	Sahamongkol Film	324.5^{R}	2001	
4	4	Death Whisperer 2	M Studio	286.08	2024	
5	4	The Undertaker	Taibaan Studio	245.10	2023	
6	2	The Legend of King Naresuan 1	Sahamongkol Film	219.06	2007	
7	3	The Legend of King Naresuan 2	Sahamongkol Film	216.87	2007	
8	5	The Legend of King Naresuan 5	Sahamongkol Film	206.86	2014	
9	4	The Legend of King Naresuan 3	Sahamongkol Film	201.08	2011	
10	9	Death Whisperer	M Studio	198.70	2023	
11	2	Tom-Yum-Goong	Sahamongkol Film	183.35	2005	
12	11	How to Make Millions Before Grandma Dies	GDH	172.70	2024	
13	9	Love Destiny: The Movie	GDH	167.67	2022	
14	9	Joking Jazz 4G	M Pictures	166.53	2016	
15	10	Nakee 2	M Pictures	161.19	2018	
16	1	Bang Rajan	Film Bangkok	151	2000	
17	7	ATM: Er Rak Error	GTH	150.11	2012	
18	1	Nang Nak	Tai Entertainment	149.60	1999	
19	13	Brother of the Year	GDH	146.45	2018	
20	7	Bangkok Traffic (Love) Story	GTH	145.82	2009	
21	4	The Holy Man	Phranakorn Film	141.86	2005	
22	17	Tootsies & The Fake	GDH	140.02	2019	
23	23	Death Whisperer 3	M Studio	137.90	2025	
24	4	My Girl	GMM–Tai–Hub Ho Hin Films	137.30	2003	
25	18	Friend Zone	GDH	134.15	2019	
26	11	The Legend of King Naresuan 4	Sahamongkol Film	131.60	2011	
27	10	Hello Stranger	GTH	131.04	2010	
28	11	Loser Lover	M39 Studio	125.03	2010	
29	3	Killer Tattoo	RS Film	123	2001	
30	14	Ladda Land	GTH	116.46	2011	
31	20	The Legend of King Naresuan 6	Sahamongkol Film	115.11	2015	
32	22	Bad Genius	GDH	112.15	2017	
33	22	One Day	GDH	110.91	2016	
34	6	Shutter	GTH	109.98	2004	
35	11	Phobia 2	GTH	109.41	2009	
36	36	Confessions of a Shaman	M Studio	102.95	2026	
37	20	The Teacher's Diary	GTH	100.17	2014	
38	9	Yam Yasothon	Sahamongkol Film	99.13	2005	
39	5	Ong-Bak: Muay Thai Warrior	Sahamongkol Film	99	2003	
40	2	The Iron Ladies	Tai Entertainment	98.70	2000	
41	16	32 December Love Error	M39 Studio	97.92	2009	
42	14	Ong-Bak 2	Sahamongkol Film	97.44	2008	
43	24	Crazy Crying Lady	M39 Studio	96	2012	
44	40	4 Kings II	Shinesaeng Ad.Venture	95.17	2023	
45	12	Noodle Boxer	RS Film	94.18	2006	
46	12	Khan Kluay	Sahamongkol Film	93.63	2006	
47	46	The Undertaker 2	Taibaan Studio	93.43	2026	
48	12	Nong Teng	Sahamongkol Film	90.12	2006	
49	6	Bangkok Haunted	RS Film	90	2001	
50	19	Saranair: The Movie	Sahamongkol Film	88.14	2009	

== Highest-grossing animated films ==
† Background shading indicates films playing on 16 November 2026 in Thai theaters.

Highest-grossing animated films (Only in Bangkok, Metropolitan region and Chiang Mai cinemas)
Rank	Peak	Title	Distributor	Gross (฿ million)	Year	Ref
1	1	Demon Slayer The Movie: Infinity Castle	Sony Pictures Releasing	175.6^{D}	2025	
2	2	Zootopia 2	Walt Disney Pictures	143.53	2025	
3	1	Frozen 2	Walt Disney Pictures	129.71	2019	
4	1	Minions	United International Pictures	116.23	2015	
5	2	The Lion King^{TLK}	Walt Disney Pictures	112.03	2019	
6	2	How to Train Your Dragon: The Hidden World	United International Pictures	103.16	2019	
7	5	Inside Out 2	Walt Disney Pictures	97.67	2024	
8	1	Khan Kluay	Sahamongkol Film	93.63	2006	
9	3	Zootopia	Walt Disney Pictures	87.67	2016	
10	7	Demon Slayer The Movie: Mugen Train	M Pictures	74.27	2020	
11	2	Khan Kluay 2	Kantana	73.38	2009	
12	3	Despicable Me 2	United International Pictures	69.67	2013	
13	7	Toy Story 4	Walt Disney Pictures	67.09	2019	
14	3	Kung Fu Panda 2	United International Pictures	66.80	2011	
15	7	Incredibles 2	Walt Disney Pictures	63.43	2018	
16	13	Spider-Man: Across the Spider-Verse	Sony Pictures Releasing	62.00	2023	
17	8	Ralph Breaks the Internet	Walt Disney Pictures	61.57	2018	
18	6	Inside Out	Walt Disney Pictures	59.30	2015	
19	8	Kung Fu Panda 3	20th Century Fox	58.79	2016	
20	9	Despicable Me 3	United International Pictures	57.26	2017	

^{TLK}Disney, which produced The Lion King (2019), considered the film to be live-action despite the entire film (aside from its opening shot) being computer animated. Others, such as the Hollywood Foreign Press Association (presenter of the Golden Globe Awards), deemed it to be animated based on specified criteria.

== Highest-grossing films by year ==
† Background shading indicates films playing on 16 November 2026 in Thai theaters.

Highest-grossing films by year of release (Only in Bangkok, Metropolitan region and Chiang Mai cinemas)
Year	Title	Distributor	Gross (฿ million)	Ref
1993	Jurassic Park	United International Pictures	74.34	
1994	Speed	20th Century Fox	56	
1995	Die Hard with a Vengeance	Buena Vista International	60	
1996	Independence Day	20th Century Fox	123.42	
1997	Titanic	20th Century Fox	213.65	
1998	Armageddon	Buena Vista International	116.09	
1999	Nang Nak	Tai Entertainment	149.60	
2000	Bang Rajan	Film Bangkok	151	
2001	The Legend of Suriyothai	Sahamongkol Film	324.5^{R}	
2002	Harry Potter and the Chamber of Secrets	Warner Bros. Pictures	149.81	
2003	The Lord of the Rings: The Return of the King	Mongkol Major	184.63	
2004	Harry Potter and the Prisoner of Azkaban	Warner Bros. Pictures	161.80	
2005	Harry Potter and the Goblet of Fire	Warner Bros. Pictures	190.86	
2006	Pirates of the Caribbean: Dead Man's Chest	Buena Vista International	125.93	
2007	The Legend of King Naresuan 1	Sahamongkol Film	219.06	
2008	The Mummy: Tomb of the Dragon Emperor	United International Pictures	123	
2009	Avatar	20th Century Fox	303	
2010	Harry Potter and the Deathly Hallows – Part 1	Warner Bros. Pictures	171.40	
2011	Transformers: Dark of the Moon	United International Pictures	291.20	
2012	The Avengers	Walt Disney Pictures	252.16	
2013	Pee Mak	GTH	568.55	
2014	I Fine..Thank You..Love You	GTH	330.55	
2015	Furious 7	United International Pictures	387.85	
2016	Captain America: Civil War	Walt Disney Pictures	311.21	
2017	The Fate of the Furious	United International Pictures	321.96	
2018	Avengers: Infinity War	Walt Disney Pictures	420.89	
2019	Avengers: Endgame	Walt Disney Pictures	617.55	
2020	Riam Fighting Angel	M Pictures	76.49	
2021	Spider-Man: No Way Home	Sony Pictures Releasing	239.29	
2022	Avatar: The Way of Water	Walt Disney Pictures	376.23	
2023	The Undertaker	Taibaan Studio	245.10	
2024	Death Whisperer 2	M Studio	286.08	
2025	Avatar: Fire and Ash	Walt Disney Pictures	272.82	
2026	Spider-Man: Brand New Day	Sony Pictures Releasing	277.76	

== Timeline of highest-grossing films ==
Timeline of the highest-grossing films (Only in Bangkok, Metropolitan region and Chiang Mai cinemas)
Established	Title	Distributor	Gross (฿ million)	Ref
1993	Jurassic Park	United International Pictures	74.34	
1996	Eraser	Warner Bros. Pictures	79.85	
1996	Independence Day	20th Century Fox	123.42	
1997	The Lost World: Jurassic Park	United International Pictures	124.75	
1998	Titanic	20th Century Fox	213.65	
2001	The Legend of Suriyothai	Sahamongkol Film	324.5^{R}	
2013	Pee Mak	GTH	568.55	
2019	Avengers: Endgame	Walt Disney Pictures	617.55	

== Biggest opening records ==
=== Biggest opening day ===
† Background shading indicates films opening on a public holiday.

Biggest opening day for films^{OD} (Only in Bangkok, Metropolitan region and Chiang Mai cinemas)
Rank	Title	Date	Gross (฿ million)	Ref
1	Avengers: Endgame	April 24, 2019	75.32	
2	Avengers: Infinity War	April 25, 2018	54.88	
3	Iron Man 3 †	May 1, 2013	45.53	
4	Furious 7	April 1, 2015	41.60	
5	Doctor Strange in the Multiverse of Madness †	May 4, 2022	41.28	
6	The Fate of the Furious	April 12, 2017	39.36	
7	The Avengers †	May 1, 2012	39.13	
8	Captain America: Civil War	April 27, 2016	37.64	
9	Captain Marvel	March 6, 2019	37.17	
10	Spider-Man 3 †	May 1, 2007	34.10	

^{OD}The biggest opening day excluding any revenue from earlier preview showings.

=== Biggest 4–day opening weekend ===
Biggest 4–day opening weekend for films^{OW} (Only in Bangkok, Metropolitan region and Chiang Mai cinemas)
Rank	Title	Weekend	Gross (฿ million)	Ref
1	Avengers: Endgame	April 25–28, 2019	251.89	
2	Avengers: Infinity War	April 26–29, 2018	171.67	
3	Jurassic World: Fallen Kingdom	June 7–10, 2018	149.20	
4	Furious 7	April 2–5, 2015	147	
5	Avengers: Age of Ultron	April 30 – May 3, 2015	132.82	
6	Captain America: Civil War	April 28 – May 1, 2016	131.34	
7	The Fate of the Furious	April 13–16, 2017	129.64	
8	Transformers: Age of Extinction	June 26–29, 2014	128	
9	Jurassic World	June 11–14, 2015	127.62	
10	Spider-Man: Brand New Day	July 30 – August 2, 2026	116.70	

^{OW}The biggest 4–day opening weekend refers to the gross between its first Thursday and Sunday of release excluding any revenue from earlier preview showings or midweek releases.

== Highest-grossing franchises and film series ==
† Background shading indicates that at least one film in the series is playing on 16 November 2026 in Thai theaters.

Highest-grossing franchises and film series (Only in Bangkok, Metropolitan region and Chiang Mai cinemas)(The films in each franchise can be viewed by selecting "show".)

Rank	Series	Total gross	No. of films	Average of films	Highest-grossing film

1
Marvel Cinematic Universe^{S}
฿6,326,600,000
38
฿166,489,474
Avengers: Endgame (฿617,550,000)

The Infinity Saga	฿4,552,640,000	23	฿197,940,870	Avengers: Endgame (฿617,550,000)
/ Phase Three / ฿2,812,020,000 / 11 / ฿255,638,182 / Avengers: Endgame (฿617,550,000); 1 / Avengers: Endgame (2019) / ฿617,550,000; 2 / Avengers: Infinity War (2018) / ฿420,890,000; 3 / Captain America: Civil War (2016) / ฿311,210,000; 4 / Captain Marvel (2019) / ฿260,780,000; 5 / Spider-Man: Far From Home (2019) / ฿238,990,000; 6 / Black Panther (2018) / ฿199,040,000; 7 / Spider-Man: Homecoming (2017) / ฿182,970,000; 8 / Thor: Ragnarok (2017) / ฿182,610,000; 9 / Guardians of the Galaxy Vol. 2 (2017) / ฿135,600,000; 10 / Doctor Strange (2016) / ฿133,640,000; 11 / Ant-Man and the Wasp (2018) / ฿128,740,000
/ Phase Two / ฿1,076,760,000 / 6 / ฿179,460,000 / Avengers: Age of Ultron (฿294,770,000); 1 / Avengers: Age of Ultron (2015) / ฿294,770,000; 2 / Iron Man 3 (2013) / ฿262,920,000; 3 / Captain America: The Winter Soldier (2014) / ฿158,000,000; 4 / Thor: The Dark World (2013) / ฿142,310,000; 5 / Ant-Man (2015) / ฿113,250,000; 6 / Guardians of the Galaxy (2014) / ฿105,510,000
/ Phase One / ฿663,860,000 / 6 / ฿110,643,333 / The Avengers (฿252,160,000); 1 / The Avengers (2012) / ฿252,160,000; 2 / Iron Man 2 (2010) / ฿151,000,000; 3 / Iron Man (2008) / ฿79,600,000; 4 / Captain America: The First Avenger (2011) / ฿75,000,000; 5 / Thor (2011) / ฿67,000,000; 6 / The Incredible Hulk (2008) / ฿39,100,000

The Multiverse Saga	฿1,773,960,000	15	฿118,264,000	Spider-Man: Brand New Day (฿277,760,000)
/ Phase Four / ฿896,340,000 / 7 / ฿128,048,571 / Spider-Man: No Way Home (฿239,290,000); 1 / Spider-Man: No Way Home (2021) / ฿239,290,000; 2 / Doctor Strange in the Multiverse of Madness (2022) / ฿221,000,000; 3 / Thor: Love and Thunder (2022) / ฿163,400,000; 4 / Black Panther: Wakanda Forever (2022) / ฿147,900,000; 5 / Eternals (2021) / ฿75,010,000; 6 / Shang-Chi and the Legend of the Ten Rings (2021) / ฿44,740,000; 7 / Black Widow (2021)^{BW} / ฿5,000,000
/ Phase Five / ฿534,380,000 / 6 / ฿89,063,333 / Deadpool & Wolverine (฿154,600,000); 1 / Deadpool & Wolverine (2024) / ฿154,600,000; 2 / Guardians of the Galaxy Vol. 3 (2023) / ฿122,100,000; 3 / Ant-Man and the Wasp: Quantumania (2023) / ฿82,850,000; 4 / Captain America: Brave New World (2025) / ฿61,340,000; 5 / Thunderbolts* (2025) / ฿61,200,000; 6 / The Marvels (2023) / ฿52,290,000
/ Phase Six / ฿343,240,000 / 2 / ฿171,620,000 / Spider-Man: Brand New Day (฿277,760,000); 1 / Spider-Man: Brand New Day (2026) / ฿277,760,000; 2 / The Fantastic Four: First Steps (2025) / ฿65,480,000

2	Spider-Man	฿2,109,593,000	17	฿124,093,706	Brand New Day (฿277,760,000)
/ Marvel Cinematic Universe / ฿939,010,000 / 4 / ฿234,752,500 / Brand New Day (฿277,760,000); 1 / Brand New Day (2026) / ฿277,760,000; 2 / No Way Home (2021) / ฿239,290,000; 3 / Far From Home (2019) / ฿238,990,000; 4 / Homecoming (2017) / ฿182,970,000
/ Raimi series / ฿464,663,000 / 3 / ฿154,887,667 / Spider-Man 3 (฿179,300,000); 1 / Spider-Man 3 (2007) / ฿179,300,000; 2 / Spider-Man 2 (2004) / ฿157,400,000; 3 / Spider-Man (2002) / ฿127,963,000
/ The Amazing Spider-Man series / ฿320,220,000 / 2 / ฿160,110,000 / The Amazing Spider-Man 2 (฿175,220,000); 1 / The Amazing Spider-Man 2 (2014) / ฿175,220,000; 2 / The Amazing Spider-Man (2012) / ฿145,000,000
/ Sony's Spider-Man Universe / ฿274,760,000 / 6 / ฿45,793,333 / Venom (฿137,310,000); 1 / Venom (2018) / ฿137,310,000; 2 / Venom: The Last Dance (2024) / ฿47,690,000; 3 / Venom: Let There Be Carnage (2021) / ฿43,970,000; 4 / Morbius (2022) / ฿21,930,000; 5 / Madame Web (2024) / ฿14,490,000; 6 / Kraven the Hunter (2024) / ฿9,370,000
/ Spider-Verse / ฿110,940,000 / 2 / ฿55,470,000 / Across the Spider-Verse (฿62,000,000); 1 / Across the Spider-Verse (2023) / ฿62,000,000; 2 / Into the Spider-Verse (2018) / ฿48,940,000

3
Wizarding World
฿1,728,841,000
11
฿157,167,364
Harry Potter and the Deathly Hallows – Part 2 (฿236,230,000)

	Harry Potter series	฿1,362,651,000	8	฿170,331,375	Deathly Hallows – Part 2 (฿236,230,000)
1	Deathly Hallows – Part 2 (2011)	฿236,230,000			
2	Goblet of Fire (2005)	฿190,860,000			
3	Deathly Hallows – Part 1 (2010)	฿171,400,000			
4	Prisoner of Azkaban (2004)	฿161,800,000			
5	Order of the Phoenix (2007)	฿159,600,000			
6	Philosopher's Stone (2001)	฿153,946,000			
7	Chamber of Secrets (2002)	฿149,815,000			
8	Half-Blood Prince (2009)	฿139,000,000			

	Fantastic Beasts series	฿366,190,000	3	฿122,063,333	Fantastic Beasts and Where to Find Them (฿150,600,000)
1	Fantastic Beasts and Where to Find Them (2016)	฿150,600,000			
2	The Crimes of Grindelwald (2018)	฿138,590,000			
3	The Secrets of Dumbledore (2022)	฿77,000,000			

4
Fast & Furious
฿1,593,540,000
11
฿144,867,273
Furious 7 (฿387,850,000)

	The Fast Saga	฿1,420,750,000	10	฿142,075,000	Furious 7 (฿387,850,000)
1	Furious 7 (2015)	฿387,850,000			
2	The Fate of the Furious (2017)	฿321,960,000			
3	Fast & Furious 6 (2013)	฿213,720,000			
4	Fast Five (2011)	฿143,900,000			
5	Fast X (2023)	฿123,530,000			
6	Fast & Furious (2009)	฿92,300,000			
7	Tokyo Drift (2006)	฿52,400,000			
8	F9 (2021)	฿41,290,000			
9	2 Fast 2 Furious (2003)	฿29,500,000			
10	The Fast and the Furious (2001)	฿14,300,000			

Hobbs & Shaw (2019)	฿172,790,000

5	Avengers	฿1,585,370,000	4	฿396,342,500	Endgame (฿617,550,000)
1	Endgame (2019)	฿617,550,000			
2	Infinity War (2018)	฿420,890,000			
3	Age of Ultron (2015)	฿294,770,000			
4	The Avengers (2012)	฿252,160,000			

6
Thai historical film series
by Chatrichalerm Yukol
฿1,415,080,000
7
฿202,154,286
The Legend of Suriyothai (฿324,500,000)

	The Legend of King Naresuan series	฿1,090,580,000	6	฿181,763,333	The Legend of King Naresuan 1 (฿219,060,000)
1	The Legend of King Naresuan 1 (2007)	฿219,060,000			
2	The Legend of King Naresuan 2 (2007)	฿216,870,000			
3	The Legend of King Naresuan 5 (2014)	฿206,860,000			
4	The Legend of King Naresuan 3 (2011)	฿201,080,000			
5	The Legend of King Naresuan 4 (2011)	฿131,600,000			
6	The Legend of King Naresuan 6 (2015)	฿115,110,000			

The Legend of Suriyothai (2001)	฿324,500,000

7	X-Men	฿1,354,420,000	14	฿96,744,286	Deadpool & Wolverine (฿154,600,000)
/ Main series / ฿646,940,000 / 7 / ฿92,420,000 / Days of Future Past (฿114,000,000); 1 / Days of Future Past (2014) / ฿114,000,000; 2 / Apocalypse (2016) / ฿111,300,000; 3 / The Last Stand (2006) / ฿107,000,000; 4 / X2 (2003) / ฿99,510,000; 5 / First Class (2011) / ฿92,000,000; 6 / X-Men (2000) / ฿70,000,000; 7 / Dark Phoenix (2019) / ฿53,130,000
/ Deadpool series / ฿430,750,000 / 3 / ฿143,583,333 / Deadpool & Wolverine (฿154,600,000); 1 / Deadpool & Wolverine (2024) / ฿154,600,000; 2 / Deadpool (2016) / ฿151,600,000; 3 / Deadpool 2 (2018) / ฿124,550,000
/ Wolverine series / ฿264,010,000 / 3 / ฿88,003,333 / Logan (฿99,210,000); 1 / Logan (2017) / ฿99,210,000; 2 / The Wolverine (2013) / ฿85,000,000; 3 / Origins: Wolverine (2009) / ฿79,800,000
The New Mutants (2020) / ฿12,720,000

8	Transformers	฿1,292,970,000	8	฿161,621,250	Age of Extinction (฿310,230,000)
1	Age of Extinction (2014)	฿310,230,000			
2	Dark of the Moon (2011)	฿291,200,000			
3	Revenge of the Fallen (2009)	฿201,600,000			
4	The Last Knight (2017)	฿167,020,000			
5	Transformers (2007)	฿126,900,000			
6	Bumblebee (2018)	฿100,750,000			
7	Rise of the Beasts (2023)	฿85,800,000			
8	One (2024)	฿9,470,000			

9	DC Extended Universe^{S}	฿1,252,760,000	15	฿83,517,333	Aquaman (฿254,090,000)
1	Aquaman (2018)	฿254,090,000			
2	Batman v Superman: Dawn of Justice (2016)	฿148,200,000			
3	Justice League (2017)	฿118,140,000			
4	Wonder Woman (2017)	฿117,290,000			
5	Suicide Squad (2016)	฿99,000,000			
6	Aquaman and the Lost Kingdom (2023)	฿98,960,000			
7	Man of Steel (2013)	฿96,000,000			
8	Shazam! (2019)	฿71,010,000			
9	Black Adam (2022)	฿69,300,000			
10	Wonder Woman 1984 (2020)	฿65,800,000			
11	The Flash (2023)	฿43,400,000			
12	Birds of Prey (2020)	฿35,660,000			
13	Shazam! Fury of the Gods (2023)	฿18,210,000			
14	Blue Beetle (2023)	฿17,350,000			
15	The Suicide Squad (2021)^{TSS}	฿350,000			

10
Jurassic Park
฿1,110,901,000
7
฿158,700,143
Jurassic World (฿290,640,000)

	Jurassic World series	฿863,620,000	4	฿215,905,000	Jurassic World (฿290,640,000)
1	Jurassic World (2015)	฿290,640,000			
2	Fallen Kingdom (2018)	฿288,880,000			
3	Rebirth (2025)	฿146,500,000			
4	Dominion (2022)	฿137,600,000			

	Jurassic Park trilogy	฿247,281,000	3	฿82,427,000	The Lost World (฿124,751,000)
1	The Lost World (1997)	฿124,751,000			
2	Jurassic Park (1993)	฿74,340,000			
3	Jurassic Park III (2001)	฿48,190,000			

11	Avatar	฿952,050,000	3	฿317,350,000	The Way of Water (฿376,230,000)
1	The Way of Water (2022)	฿376,230,000			
2	Avatar (2009)	฿303,000,000			
3	Fire and Ash (2025)	฿272,820,000			

12	Batman	฿794,970,000	13	฿61,151,538	Batman v Superman: Dawn of Justice (฿148,200,000)
/ The Dark Knight trilogy / ฿295,300,000 / 3 / ฿98,433,333 / The Dark Knight Rises (฿133,000,000); 1 / The Dark Knight Rises (2012) / ฿133,000,000; 2 / The Dark Knight (2008) / ฿90,000,000; 3 / Batman Begins (2005) / ฿72,300,000
Batman v Superman: Dawn of Justice (2016) / ฿148,200,000
/ Burton/Schumacher series / ฿134,350,000 / 4 / ฿33,587,500 / Batman & Robin (฿70,250,000); 1 / Batman & Robin (1997) / ฿70,250,000; 2 / Batman Forever (1995) / ฿44,500,000; 3 / Batman Returns (1992) / ฿14,100,000; 4 / Batman (1989) / ฿5,500,000
/ Joker series / ฿132,910,000 / 2 / ฿66,455,000 / Joker (฿119,110,000); 1 / Joker (2019) / ฿119,110,000; 2 / Folie à Deux (2024) / ฿13,800,000
The Batman (2022) / ฿51,500,000
Catwoman (2004) / ฿25,600,000
The Lego Batman Movie (2017) / ฿7,110,000

13
Star Wars^{SW}
฿782,298,000
10
฿78,229,800
The Force Awakens (฿155,620,000)

Skywalker Saga
฿653,808,000
6
฿108,968,000
The Force Awakens (฿155,620,000)

	Sequel trilogy	฿354,490,000	3	฿118,163,333	The Force Awakens (฿155,620,000)
1	VII – The Force Awakens (2015)	฿155,620,000			
2	VIII – The Last Jedi (2017)	฿107,470,000			
3	IX – The Rise of Skywalker (2019)	฿91,400,000			

	Prequel trilogy	฿299,318,000	3	฿99,772,667	The Phantom Menace (฿113,830,000)
1	I – The Phantom Menace (1999)	฿113,830,000			
2	III – Revenge of the Sith (2005)	฿98,050,000			
3	II – Attack of the Clones (2002)	฿87,438,000			

	Standalone films	฿128,490,000	4	฿32,122,500	Rogue One (฿64,580,000)
1	Rogue One (2016)	฿64,580,000			
2	The Mandalorian and Grogu (2026)	฿30,150,000			
3	Solo (2018)	฿29,760,000			
4	The Clone Wars (2008)	฿4,000,000			

14	Mission: Impossible	฿780,563,000	8	฿97,570,375	Fallout (฿152,010,000)
1	Fallout (2018)	฿152,010,000			
2	Rogue Nation (2015)	฿140,110,000			
3	Mission: Impossible III (2006)	฿107,340,000			
4	Ghost Protocol (2011)	฿105,790,000			
5	Mission: Impossible 2 (2000)	฿80,983,000			
6	Dead Reckoning (2023)	฿79,990,000			
7	The Final Reckoning (2025)	฿70,940,000			
8	Mission: Impossible (1996)	฿43,400,000			

15
James Bond^{JB}
฿758,312,000
9
฿84,256,889
Skyfall (฿119,500,000)

	Daniel Craig series	฿453,120,000	5	฿90,624,000	Skyfall (฿119,500,000)
1	Skyfall (2012)	฿119,500,000			
2	Spectre (2015)	฿115,750,000			
3	Quantum of Solace (2008)	฿92,200,000			
4	Casino Royale (2006)	฿83,900,000			
5	No Time to Die (2021)	฿41,770,000			

	Pierce Brosnan series	฿305,192,000	4	฿76,298,000	Die Another Day (฿108,566,000)
1	Die Another Day (2002)	฿108,566,000			
2	Tomorrow Never Dies (1998)	฿82,198,000			
3	The World Is Not Enough (1999)	฿70,328,000			
4	GoldenEye (1995)	฿44,100,000			

16
Middle-earth
฿725,197,000
7
฿103,599,571
The Lord of the Rings: The Return of the King (฿184,630,000)

Jackson series
฿723,767,000
6
฿120,627,833
The Lord of the Rings: The Return of the King (฿184,630,000)

	The Lord of the Rings	฿415,257,000	3	฿138,419,000	The Return of the King (฿184,630,000)
1	The Return of the King (2003)	฿184,630,000			
2	The Two Towers (2002)	฿140,337,000			
3	The Fellowship of the Ring (2001)	฿90,290,000			

	The Hobbit	฿308,510,000	3	฿102,836,667	The Battle of the Five Armies (฿112,000,000)
1	The Battle of the Five Armies (2014)	฿112,000,000			
2	The Desolation of Smaug (2013)	฿104,590,000			
3	An Unexpected Journey (2012)	฿91,920,000			

The War of the Rohirrim (2024)	฿1,430,000

17	Death Whisperer †	฿688,330,000	4	฿172,082,500	Death Whisperer 2 (฿286,080,000)
1	Death Whisperer 2 (2024)	฿286,080,000			
2	Death Whisperer (2023)	฿198,700,000			
3	Death Whisperer 3 (2025)	฿137,900,000			
4	Saming the Werebeast (2026) †	฿65,650,000			

18	Captain America	฿605,550,000	4	฿151,387,500	Civil War (฿311,210,000)
1	Civil War (2016)	฿311,210,000			
2	The Winter Soldier (2014)	฿158,000,000			
3	The First Avenger (2011)	฿75,000,000			
4	Brave New World (2025)	฿61,340,000			

19	Godzilla †	฿590,209,000	7	฿84,315,571	Godzilla vs. Kong (฿162,000,000)
/ MonsterVerse / ฿447,550,000 / 4 / ฿111,887,500 / Godzilla vs. Kong (฿162,000,000); 1 / Godzilla vs. Kong (2021) / ฿162,000,000; 2 / Godzilla x Kong: The New Empire (2024) / ฿114,200,000; 3 / Godzilla: King of the Monsters (2019) / ฿86,350,000; 4 / Godzilla (2014) / ฿85,000,000
Godzilla (1998) / ฿113,519,000
/ Toho films † / ฿29,140,000 / 2 / ฿14,570,000 / Godzilla Minus Zero (฿16,330,000); 1 / Godzilla Minus Zero (2026) † / ฿16,330,000; 2 / Shin Godzilla (2016) / ฿12,810,000

20	Pirates of the Caribbean	฿573,945,000	5	฿114,789,000	Dead Men Tell No Tales (฿131,780,000)
1	Dead Men Tell No Tales (2017)	฿131,780,000			
2	At World's End (2007)	฿130,000,000			
3	Dead Man's Chest (2006)	฿125,930,000			
4	On Stranger Tides (2011)	฿109,800,000			
5	The Curse of the Black Pearl (2003)	฿76,435,000			

^{S}Shared universes for which some properties also have their own entries.

^{BW}Black Widow was shown in Thai theaters only 5 days before release on streaming services due to COVID-19 pandemic and accounts the gross earning only the first 3 days of release.

^{TSS}The Suicide Squad was shown in Thai theaters only 16 days before release on streaming services due to COVID-19 pandemic and accounts the gross earning only the first day of release.

^{JB}James Bond series starring with Roger Moore, Sean Connery, Timothy Dalton and George Lazenby are not known exact figures gross in Thailand.

^{SW}Star Wars original trilogy is not known exact figures gross in Thailand.

== See also ==
- List of highest-grossing films
- List of 2026 box office number-one films in Thailand
