= Present Still Perfect =

- Directed by: Anusorn Soisa-Ngim
- Written by: Anusorn Soisa-Ngim
- Production company: Commetive Productions
- Release date: 12 March 2020 (Thailand)
- Running time: 114 minutes
- Country: Thailand

Present Still Perfect is the sequel to Present Perfect. it is an LGBT romance film shot in Thailand and written and directed by Thai producer Anusorn Soisa-Ngim.

External videos
- Present Still Perfect (2020) Trailer on YouTube

== Plot ==
Present Still Perfect is the sequel Present Perfect (2017), in which "Toey" falls in love with "Oat," a man who is about to get married.

Four years later, "Toey" runs into "Oat" at the airport, and all his pains return. In an attempt to cope with his pains, he decides to travel to Koh Kood where he meets "Jane" the owner of the guest house who recently found out her husband had an affair, and "Kenta," a traveler from Japan who was staying at her place. The peace and beauty of the island brought back his joy, but he knew he couldn't ignore his feelings for "Oat" forever. Until one night, he receives a message from "Oat" about how much he missed him. "Toey replies mentioning that he loves him too, because deep inside being with "Oat" is all he wants, but he's wary, knowing that their love is forbidden. The next morning "Oat" shows up at Koh Kood. Now "Toey" has to decide whether to follow his heart and rekindle relationship with "Oat" or let him go since they can never truly be together.

== Cast ==
- Adisorn Tonawanik as Toey
- Kritsana Maroukasonti as Oat
- Darina Boonchu as Jane
- Ryota Omi as Kenta
- Dhamawat Suntanaphan as Kham
- Chalida Sutitosatham as Namwhan
- Aunruen Soisangim as Namwhan's Mother (voice)
- Lakkana Punwichai as Self (voice)
- Anusorn Soisa-Ngim as Self (voice)
