= Present Perfect (2017 film) =

- แค่นี้ก็ดีแล้ว
- Directed by: Anusorn Soisa-Ngim
- Written by: Anusorn Soisa-Ngim
- Screenplay by: Anusorn Soisa-Ngim
- Produced by: Nuttachai Jiraanont; Tanwarin Sukapisit; Chen Rong Hua
- Starring: Maroukasonti Kritsana; Tonawanik Adisorn
- Cinematography: Nuttanon Charoenhirun
- Release date: 9 March 2017
- Running time: 1 hour 47 minutes
- Countries: Thailand; Japan
- Languages: Thai; Japanese; English

Present Perfect (Thai: แค่นี้ก็ดีแล้ว; RTGS: Khae Ni Ko Di Laeo) is a 2017 LGBT-romantic Thai film directed by Anusorn Soisa-Ngim, starring Maroukasonti Kritsana and Tonawanik Adisorn. The film was produced by Nuttachai Jiraanont, Tanwarin Sukapisit and Chen Rong Hua. It was premiered in Thailand on March 9, 2017.

The film won the Best Film Award at the LGBTQ Amsterdam Film Festival in the Netherlands and screened at many film festivals worldwide, including the World Film Festival of Bangkok, Thailand, Serile Filmului Gay International Film Festival, Romania, Western Visayas Film Festival, Philippines, and Taiwan.

== Synopsis ==
Following a breakup, Toey (Tonawanik Adisorn) decides to heal his broken heart in Higashikawa town where he meets Oat (Maroukasonti Kritsana), a man travelling to Japan to experience freedom for the last time in his life. Going from strangers to friends, romance sparks between the two. Before returning to the "real" world, the two men have to pick up the broken pieces and rebuild.

== Cast ==
=== Main ===
- Maroukasonti Kritsana as Oat
- Tonawanik Adisorn as Toey

=== Supporting ===
- Sittachai Priyada as Mhai
- Midori Tamate as Yumi

== Sequel ==
=== Present Still Perfect ===
The sequel, Present Still Perfect, was released on March 12, 2020. It is written and directed Anusorn Soisa-Ngim.
