= Bangkok Dark Tales =

- Release poster
- Directed by: Anusorn Soisa-ngim; Thanvimol Onpapliw; Alwa Ritsila
- Written by: Arinchai Rattanavijit; Anusorn Soisa-ngim
- Starring: Napat Bunjongjitpaisarn; Adisorn Tonawanik; Tanunya Muntavee; Naravoot Aumnuy; Yhok Sirimart; Nachjaree Horawatchakun; Korawan Lodsantia
- Production company: Commetive Production
- Distributed by: M Pictures
- Release date: May 23, 2019
- Running time: 151 minutes
- Country: Thailand
- Language: Thai

Bangkok Dark Tales (Thai: บางกอก...สยอง, Bangkok...sayong, lit "Bangkok...horror") is a 2019 Thai horror anthology film directed by three different directors. The film is based on urban legends that shocked Bangkokians. Three situations, three horror stories and three creepy places that happened in Bangkok.

== Premise ==
=== Happy New Year ===
Gam, an office girl who has to work late into the night on New Year's Eve with two other trainees. Her desk is next to the desk of a former colleague who recently died due to overwork. His Santa Claus costume that he wore to the office Xmas party was still hanging on the wall, which made her feel uneasy when she glanced at it. Gam is arrogant and often has a sharp tongue with the female trainee and the security guard. On this night when everyone disappears, she must confront and escape for her life a mysterious axe-wielding killer in Santa Claus costume.

=== The 5th Cinema ===
There is an urban legend about a movie theatre that has 5 cinemas portion in total. The 5th cinema shows movies all day and night without opening it to the general public as usual so that ghosts can watch them at the owner's order. Oil, a con artist girl, tricks Eak, a fake rich man that she met through a dating app into watching a late-night movie together. While they were watching a movie, she suddenly invited Eak to go into the 5th cinema. Eak refused but Oil took off her shirt to tempt him to follow her. Before both she and he encountered horror in there and never came back out again.

=== Haunted House ===
Bee and Ann are two best friends who are net idols and online sellers, traveled from the upcountry to Bangkok for the first time to live here. Just the first day they arrived, Ann's mobile phone was snatched and both of them were overcharged by the taxi driver. This made Ann very upset. The couple got a cheap rental house without knowing its origins, with Bee taking care of everything herself. This house is actually haunted, all five members of the house were killed and their spirits still linger here. That allows both Bee and Ann to experience a horror story mixed with comedy in a dark comedy style.

== Cast ==
Happy New Year

- Napat Bunjongjitpaisarn as Gam
- Adisorn Tonawanik as Jack
- Souna Phanthavong as Praew
- Alwa Ritsila as Security Guard
- Voratanapot Tuntiviriyangkul as Suttipong

The 5th Cinema

- Tanunya Muntavee as Oil
- Naravoot Aumnuy as Eak
- Yhok Sirimart as Cinema Manager
- Rattaporn Sukpan as Cinema Employee

Haunted House

- Nachjaree Horawetchakun as Bee
- Korawan Lodsantia as Ann

== Reviews ==
Although the film was not well-received, the reviews in Sanook.com analyzed that the protagonists from all 3 parts were all beautiful women who used their bodies and beauty to seduce men to improve their status. In a society where everyone is trying to survive like Bangkok, even though sometimes the law cannot punish them, there may be some supernatural power that punishes them.
