= Karma (2015 Thai film) =

2015 film

- Film poster
- Directed by: Kanittha Kwanyu
- Written by: Kanittha Kwanyu
- Produced by: Prachya Pinkaew; Sita Vosbein; Paninya Paksa; Settha Veerathunmanon
- Cinematography: Kittipat Jinathong
- Edited by: Thitiphan Mahakijkampol
- Music by: Ittichet Chawang; Payont Permsith
- Distributed by: Sahamongkol Film International
- Release date: 15 October 2015
- Running time: 91 minutes
- Country: Thailand
- Language: Thai

Karma (Thai: อาปัติ, Apatti) is a 2015 Thai horror-drama film directed by Kanittha Kwanyu. It was selected as the Thai entry for the Best Foreign Language Film at the 89th Academy Awards but it was not nominated.

The film, which depicts inappropriate behaviour by monks, drew protests from Buddhist advocacy groups prior to its release, and it was denied screening by the Ministry of Culture's film censorship board. It was released with a few weeks' delay, after several scenes were edited out and the film resubmitted, with its Thai title changed from Abat (อาบัติ) to Apatti (อาปัติ).

== See also ==
- List of submissions to the 89th Academy Awards for Best Foreign Language Film
- List of Thai submissions for the Academy Award for Best Foreign Language Film
