= Bangkok Metropolitan Region =

Metropolitan area in Thailand

Coordinates: 13°51′N 100°25′E

Bangkok Metropolitan Region กรุงเทพมหานครและปริมณฑล
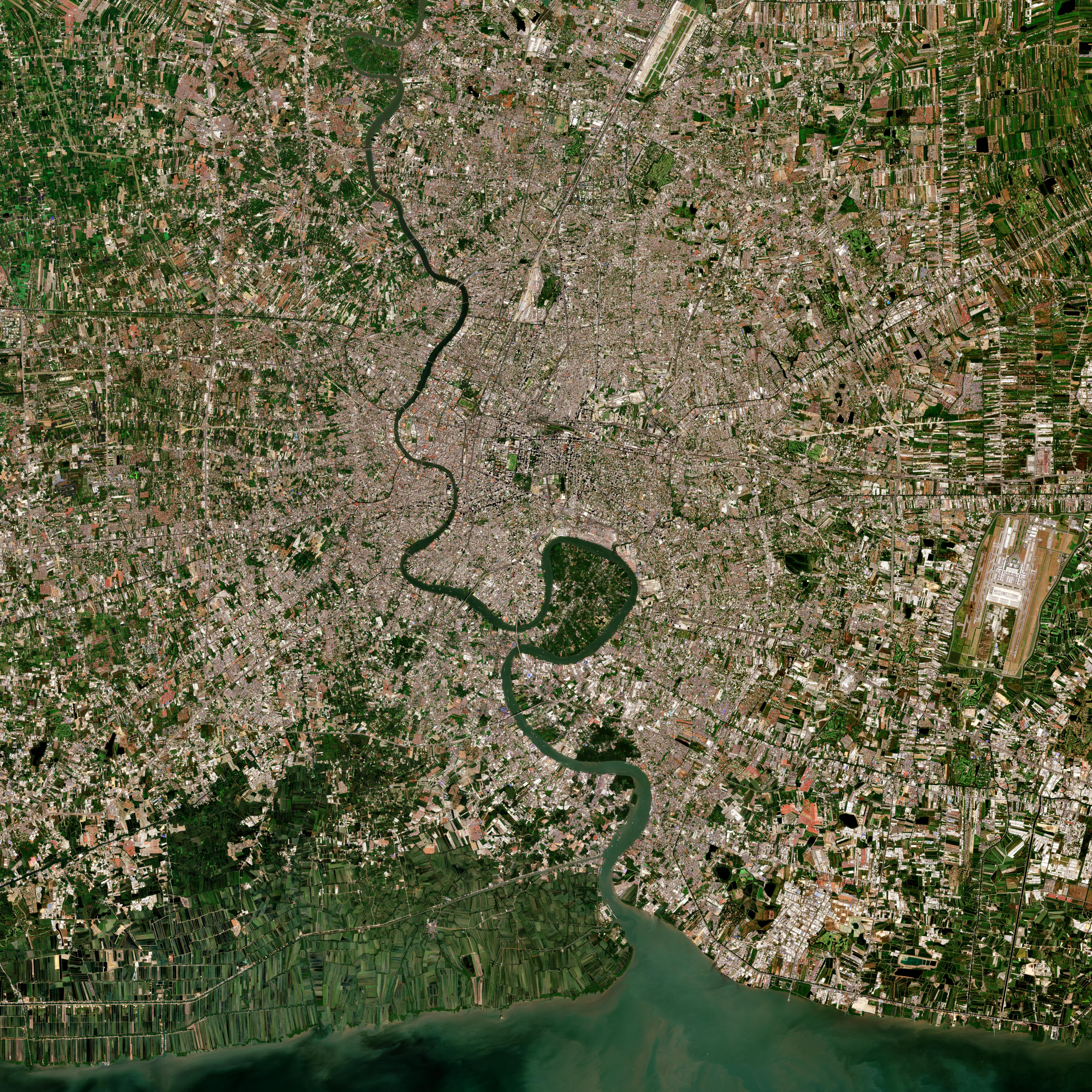
- True-color image of Bangkok and its surrounding provinces

- A map of the Bangkok Metropolitan Region. The red are city-level municipalities and Bangkok's 50 districts. The orange is the town-level municipalities. The yellow are township-level municipalities.
- Country: Thailand
- Region: Central Thailand
- Provinces: Bangkok; Nonthaburi; Nakhon Pathom; Pathum Thani; Samut Prakan; Samut Sakhon

Area
  - Metro: 7,680.7 km^{2} (2,965.5 sq mi)

Population
  - Metro: 17,400,000
  - Metro density: 2,270/km^{2} (5,870/sq mi)

GDP (Nominal, 2024)
  - Metro: ฿8.830 trillion (US$250.772 billion)
  - Per capita: ฿499,501 (US$14,186)
- Time zone: UTC+7 (ICT)

The Bangkok Metropolitan Region (BMR) (Thai: กรุงเทพมหานครและปริมณฑล; RTGS: krung thep maha nakhon lae parimonthon; lit. 'Bangkok and environs'), may refer to a government-defined "political definition" of the urban region surrounding the metropolis of Bangkok, or the built-up area, i.e., urban agglomeration of Bangkok, Thailand, which varies in size and shape, and gets filled in as development expands.

The political definition is defined as the metropolis and the five adjacent provinces of Nakhon Pathom, Pathum Thani, Nonthaburi, Samut Prakan, and Samut Sakhon.

== Area and population ==
Bangkok Metropolitan Region

The Bangkok Metropolitan Region (political definition) covers an area of 7,680.7 km^{2} (2,965.5 sq mi).

Due to the success of the service and tourism industry in Bangkok, the city has gained in popularity for work among provincial Thais from the rural areas and with people from many countries in the Indochina region as well as many South Asian countries. Since around the turn of the century, there has been a large influx of Indians into Thailand (especially Punjabis, Gujaratis, Tamils and Pashtuns), and also Persians, Portuguese, Khmer Krom, Mons, Chinese, as well as others emigrating to Thailand and Bangkok. There are large numbers of workers who legally reside outside the metropolitan area and travel into the city for day jobs. The population of the Bangkok metropolis ("the city") increases to nine million during the day, from eight million at night. The morning influx into the greater metropolitan region is not very significant, rather the influx is seasonal depending upon crop seasons in the rest of the country.

== Urban build-up ==
Bangkok has seen rapid urbanization since its population reached two million in the 1960s. Since the 1980s, greater Bangkok's built-up areas have spilled beyond Bangkok's borders to neighboring provinces, initially to the north and south. Despite a general suburbanization trend, Bangkok remained centralized and the city core remained extremely dense until the early 2000s as heavy commuter traffic limited choices. The countryside between once independent towns and the capital became ever more filled in, with the advent and expansion of urban rail transit, as well as cheap credit enabling automobile adoption by the working class. The outward push of suburbanization has intensified as park and ride lots near train stations have sprung up.

As a sprawling city, Bangkok is transforming into a region where traffic flows in all directions rather than simply to the central core, as it once did. Suburbanization has swallowed ever more fields and swamps, though even parts of Bangkok itself are not built-up. The first areas to suburbanize were in Pathum Thani, Nonthaburi, and Samut Prakan Provinces. Other areas more recently have agglomerated in Samut Sakhon and Nakhon Pathom. Samut Prakan, Nonthaburi, Pathum Thani and Samut Sakhon all have historic city centers.

Due to a lack of strict zoning laws, the metropolitan areas' growth appears haphazard. Central areas like Yaowarat, Siam, Sukhumvit, and Sathorn have seen skyrocketing land speculation as foreign investors are allowed to own condominiums, giving rise to Manhattanization. At the same time, fringe areas are being developed and the boundaries are no longer visible between each provincial city center. Due to the speed of this urban sprawl over the past twenty years, the Bangkok Metropolitan Administration has sought to tackle rising problems of commute times, pollution, and deteriorating air quality. Air quality has been declining year by year, and the city still lacks an effective mass transit network outside Bangkok proper and a clean and effective plan to resolve environmental issues.

=== Population ===
Administrative Area	Area km^{2}	Population (2000Cf)	Population (2010Cp)	Population (2011 DPA Registered)	Population (Jul 2017 Projection National Stat Office)	Population (Dec 2022 DPA Registered**)	Population (2022-2023)	Pop.Density inhabitants/km^{2}(2017 NSO)
Bangkok (Metropolis)	1,568.737	6,355,144	8,249,117	5,674,843	8,750,600	5,527,994	11,070,000	7056.63
Nonthaburi	622.30	816,614	1,333,623	1,122,627	1,549,000	1,288,637	1,001,000	1608.54
Samut Prakan	1,004.50	1,028,401	1,828,044	1,223,302	2,089,200	1,356,449	1,359,000	1352.91
Pathum Thani	1,525.90	677,649	1,326,617	1,010,898	1,495,100	1,190,060	1,190,060	779.90
Samut Sakhon	872.30	466,281	885,559	499,098	971,200	586,789	586,789	672.69
Nakhon Pathom	2,168.30	815,122	942,560	866,064	1,079,400	922,171	922,171	425.29
Bangkok Metropolitan Region (BMR)	7,762	10,159,211	14,565,520	10,396,832	15,931,300	10,872,100	!16,129,020	2,077.94

Sources:

- http://www.citypopulation.de/php/thailand-admin.php (reporting NSO.go.th Census Data, 2010 figures subject to revision.)
- http://citypopulation.de/php/thailand-prov-admin.php (reporting NSO.go.th 2017 Projections on 2010 Census data)
- https://dopa.go.th/banner_link/fileDownload/130 (Dept Provincial Affairs Dec 2016)
- DOPA 2022 via (includes registered non-Thai residents a bit less than 1 million on nationwide citizen waiting list, appears not to include long-stay foreign residents who do not seek citizenship. Thais may only register single location, those retaining upcountry residency are not counted in region, regardless where they live and work. However, it is interesting to see suburban registration increases while Bangkok does not.)
- The 2010 Census explicitly counted Thais and those with legal permanent residency status where they resided during the count. The census failed to count long-stay migrants and expats without legal permanent resident status, who are estimated to number from "perhaps [two million]" to "no less [sic] than 3 million" nationwide. Therefore, greater Bangkok's actual population easily surpassed 15 million by the 2010 census.
- The Department of Provincial Affairs th:กรมการปกครอง (DPA) Grommágaan Bpòkkrong registers Thai population and produces its own statistics separate from National Statistics Office (NSO). Millions live in Bangkok region with upcountry registration. Expats, migrants, those in refugee camps, and "native" ethnic tribes without Thai nationality may have not been counted DPA until 2016, when separate Thai nationality and Non-Thai was tabulated. The total registered population of 64,076,033 in 2011 was some 1.4 million fewer than census figures a year earlier. Thailand is still (2013) trying to officially register migrant workers.
- As of post-coup 2014, Thailand's Department of Employment released figures showing that 408,507 legal workers from three neighboring states, and 1,630,279 Burmese, 40,546 Laotians, and 153,683 Cambodians without legal work authorization were working and residing in Thailand. Nevertheless, some 180,000 Cambodians were said to have left Thailand post-coup due to rumors of a crackdown on illegal immigrants, indicating government figures may have been undercounted.

== Economy ==
For FY 2022, Bangkok Metropolitan Region had a combined economic output of 8.1 trillion baht (US$245 billion), or around half of Thailand's GDP. Bangkok (BMA) had an economic output of 5.747 trillion baht (US$176 billion). This amounts to a GPP per capita of 634,109 baht (US$19,333), half more than Samut Sakhon province, next in the ranking and more than three times for Nonthaburi province, lowest in the ranking.

Gross Provincial Product (GPP)
Rank	Province	GPP (billion baht)	GPP (billion US$)	Population	GPP per capita (baht)	GPP per capita (US$)
1	Bangkok (BMA)	6,142.910	175.690	9,063,000	675.979	19,333
2	Samut Sakhon	410.768	11.748	1,087,000	374.056	10,698
3	Samut Prakan	757.502	21.665	2,327,000	320.294	9,160
4	Nakhon Pathom	398.298	11.391	1,243,000	316.636	9,056
5	Pathum Thani	460.312	13.165	1,841,000	246.463	7,049
6	Nonthaburi	400.388	11.451	1,838,000	214.515	6,135
	BMR	8,570.179	245.103	17,399,000	465,334	13,309

== Traffic ==
As of 31 October 2012, some 7,384,934 vehicles were registered in the metro area, roughly one vehicle for every two persons. To alleviate the ensuing congestion, massive railway development is ongoing, but its construction is causing large scale disturbance to major thoroughfares.

== Destruction of green space ==
Bangkok's last undisturbed forested zone, Bang Kachao, in Samut Prakan's Phra Pradaeng District, also known as "the green lung" or (Thai: กระเพาะหมู; RTGS: krapho mu) ('pig's stomach', due to its shape) is threatened by urban sprawl, especially since a new city plan was implemented by Samut Prakan authorities. The plan has changed the pure green area to a "green and white" area, which allows residents to grow crops. Bang Kachao covers over 11,818 rai in six tambons in Phra Pradaeng.

== See also ==
- Bangkok Metropolitan Administration
- Primate city
