= Thai horror =

Horror film genre in Thai film industry

Thai Horror is a horror fiction derived from Thailand belief and culture. Apart from traditional jump scares, Thai Horror narrate the story through the elements of Thai culture, social issues, and everyday struggles. It uniquely blends real-world and supernatural terror. Its root is strongly influenced by Thai folklore, spiritual beliefs, and religion traditions. Many works of Thai horror draw upon traditional belief of supernatural being, collectively known as “phi”, the term refers to mysterious beings, ranging from ghosts to divine spirit. Generally, Thai horror played on the evil side of phis which are vengeful and malevolent, it is believed that these spirits can cause harm that can lead to sickness and gruesome death.

Thai horror gained wider popularity in the late 20th and early 21st centuries with notable films such as Nang Nak (1999) a retelling of the Mae Nak Phra Khanong Legend and Shutter (2004). Horror films became one of Thailand most internationally recognizable movie genres, receiving global attention and influencing other Asian horror productions.

Thai horror also appears in other medias such as television series, literature, and digital media while continuously played on the same topic of spiritual beliefs, folklore, and religion tradition, it is reinterpreted to reach more modern audiences.

== Origins and Cultural Backgrounds ==
=== Folklore Origins ===
Originally, Thai Horror can be traced back to traditional folklore, oral storytelling, and religious beliefs, connected to Buddhist beliefs, these stories were passed down through generation. These generally refers to “Phi” mysterious beings that range from ghost to divine spirit. These spirits influence multiple aspect of Thai people as they were believed to inhabit houses, forest, rivers, or environment around their local environment.

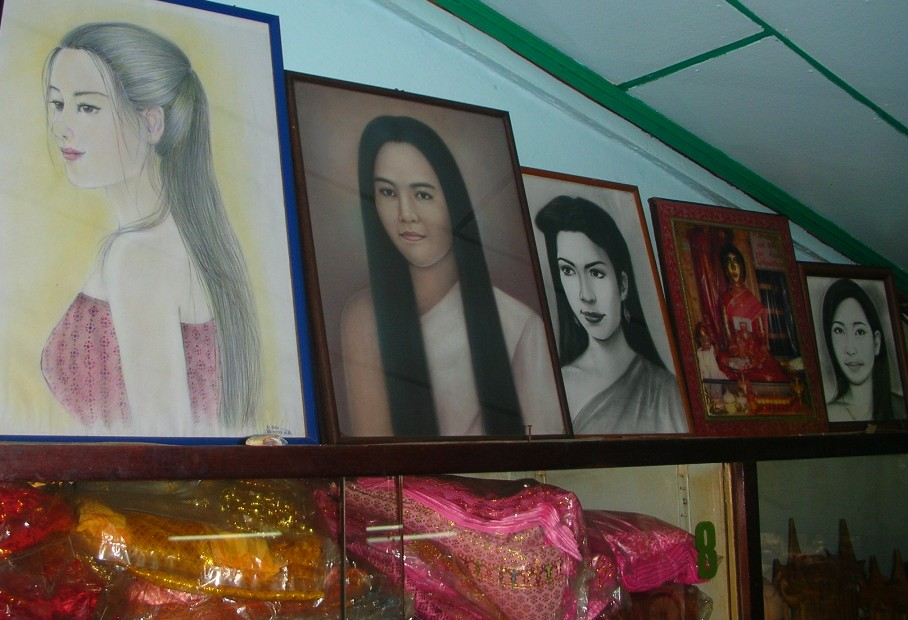
Mae Nak Phra Khanong

There are many supernatural figurines in Thai folklore that were used in Thai horror industry. The most well-known is the legend of Mae Nak Phra Khanong, a doting wife who haunts the Phra Khanong River after dying during childbirth while waiting for her husband to return from a war. Another distinguished spirit includes Krasue, first depicted in writing as a floating female head with exposed internal organ in Phi Sang Tevada “ผีสาง เทวดา” by Phraya Anuman Rajadhon, Sathirakoses, as a pen name, and Phi Pop (ผีปอบ), a malevolent spirit said to process human bodies and eat raw internal organs.

=== Early Thai Horror Cinema ===
Thai horror started to appear in cinema during mid-20th century, in this period they focused on adapting well-known local phi legends into motion films. One of the most influential stories was the legend of Mae Nak Phra Khanong, which has been retold in various productions. Early notable film adaptation was Mae Nak Phra Khanong (1959), which help pave the way for modern media.

In this era of cinema, Thai horror was closely connected to melodrama and romance which influenced the narrative to focus on tragic story rather than spiteful spirits, hence the supernatural elements in these films were tied to the relationships between human and spirit.

=== Late Twentieth Century ===
During the modernization of Thailand in late twentieth century, Thai horror became more prominent within domestic industry and targeted more toward younger audiences and add more element of daily life, communities and drama into the film. There are many influence trends from other Asian film industry which affect Thai horror industry. Thai horror still heavily drawn from local folklore and belief, they incorporated comedic element and wider range of supernatural elements to the film which resulted in wide popularity in Thailand.

A notable film such as Nang Nak (1999) successful retold of the original folklore legend, grossing over 150 million baht and became one of the first Thai films to gain global attention and screening in various countries.

=== International Breakthrough ===
In the early 21st century, Thai horror became more polished, and filmmakers started to blend horror with mystery and detective story. The best example for this era of Thai horror is Shutter (2004) which grossed over $2,584,600 in Thailand, later got remake into various version from different countries such as Photo (2006), and American remake with the same name; Shutter (2008).

The film’s success contributed to increased global interest in Thai horror film and show the ability to appeal internationally.

=== Modern Thai Horror ===
Thai horror industry entered the modern era from 2004 onward according to Asst. Prof. Dr. Sukanya Sompiboon, Deputy Dean of the Faculty of Communication Arts, Chulalongkorn University. Filmmakers started to blend different genres with horror which created fresh perspectives and narratives while still keep the traditional culture. Pee Mak (2013) is an adaptation of the legend of Mae Nak Phra Khanong that retold the story in an easier to digest story. It became the highest-grossing Thai film of all time, earning more than $33 million worldwide (Mostly in Asia).The Medium (2021), a Thai-South Korean co-production, was awarded Best Film at the 25th Bucheon International Fantastic Film Festival and was the Thai submission for the Academy Award for Best International Feature Film in its year of release, but was not nominated.

Modern Thai horror media often blends traditional folklore with modern storytelling techniques, allowing the new generations to access the folklore story. As a result, Thai horror continues to be an influential and recognizable genre within Southeast Asian cinema and popular culture.

== Characteristics ==
Thai horror is a sub-genre of horror that reflects the beliefs of Thai people and their culture who are potentially addicted to the horror story; including chit chat, mass story or something which is related to ritual or connected to it unnaturally. Commonly, Thai people tend to notice and separately prioritize real life and make up stories well, but due to the beliefs that root into them so hardly for centuries. Thai people will simulate delusional about everything in an unpredicted or unnoticeable situation as something a ghost would do for them to be scared or afraid to escape from that area specifically.

The characteristics of Thai-horror include spirit commotions, unsuccessful love, and murder. Plots about these characteristics typically follow a spirit seeking venegance, with many stories including a take where the spirit is unable to exit their place of death.

According to Nang Nak (1999), this film can be dubbed as the scariest spirit version of Thai horror cinema. It was about a woman named “Nak” who was pregnant while her husband “Mak” went out for the war and she accidentally died while pregnant. But as a spirit of a mother and housewife who had potentially waited for her husband to come back safely from the war to see her and their son who both returned as a commotion spirit waiting at the water raft. And others who lived nearby will know them as a vengeful spirit at Phra Khanong.

Thai Horror often combined with other genres such as action, romance, sci-fi, but the most popular genre in Thailand is comedy and it became one of the characteristics of Thai horror film.

== Notable films ==
- Mae Nak Phra Khanong (1958)
- Krasue Sao (1973)
- Bewitched or Gu (1981)
- Crocodile (1980)
- 303 Fear Faith Revenge (1998)
- Nang Nak (1999)
- Bangkok Haunted (2001)
- Body Jumper (2001)
- 999-9999 (2002)
- Three (2002)
- Buppah Rahtree
  - Buppah Rahtree (2003)
  - Buppah Rahtree Phase 2: Rahtree Returns (2005)
  - Buppah Rahtree 3.1: Rahtree Reborn (2009)
  - Buppha Rahtree 3.2: Rahtree Revenge (2009)
- Pisaj (2004)
- House of Ghosts (2004)
- Lizard Woman or Tuk kae phii (2004)
- SARS Wars (2004)
- Shutter (2004)
- Art of the Devil
  - Art of the Devil (2004)
  - Art of the Devil 2 (2005)
  - Art of the Devil 3 (2008)
  - Panor (2025)
  - Panor 2 (2026)
- Necromancer
  - Necromancer (2005)
  - Necromancer 2020 (2019)
- Ghost of Mae Nak (2005)
- 13 Beloved (2006)
- Colic: The Movie (2006)
- Dorm (2006)
- Pen Chu Kap Phi (2006)
- La-Tha-Pii (2006)
- Krasue Valentine (2006)
- Alone (2007)
- Coming Soon (2008)
- 4bia or Phobia
  - Phobia (2008)
  - Phobia 2 (2009)
- Secret Sunday (2009)
- Meat Grinder (2009)
- My Ex
  - My Ex (2009)
  - My Ex 2: Haunted Lover (2010)
- Laddaland (2011)
- The Unborn Child (2011)
- 3 A.M. 3D
  - 3 A.M. 3D: Part 1 (2012)
  - 3 A.M. 3D: Part 2 (2014)
  - 3 A.M. 3D: Part 3 (2018)
- Dark Flight (2012)
- Hashima Project (2013)
- Pee Mak (2013)
- Senior (2015)
- Karma (2015)
- Net I Die (2017)
- The Promise (2017)
- Pee Nak
  - Pee Nak 1 (2018)
  - Pee Nak 2 (2020)
  - Pee Nak 3 (2022)
  - Pee Nak 4 (2024)
- Inhuman Kiss
  - Inhuman Kiss 1 (2019)
  - Inhuman Kiss 2 (2023)
- The Maid (2020)
- Ghost Lab (2021)
- The Medium (2021)
- The Whole Truth (2021)
- Cracked (2022)
- Faces of Anne (2022)
- Home For Rent (2023)
- Hoon Payon (2023, Version for -20 and 18+)
- Tee Yod: Death Whisperer
  - Death Whisperer (2023)
  - Death Whisperer 2 (2024)
  - Death Whisperer 3 (2025)
  - Death Whisperer: Saming the Werebeast (2026)
- The Djinn's Curse
  - The Djinn's Curse (2023)
  - The Djinn's Curse 2 (2026)
- The Cursed Land (2024)
- Terror Tuesday: Extreme (2024)
- Ziam (2025)
- Tha Rae: The Exorcist (2025)
- Our House (2025)
- Confessions of a Shaman (2026)

== Other Medias ==
=== Television Series ===
Alongside with film industry, Thai Horror also appeared on Television. Thai Horror in Thai drama (Lakorn) also drawn the inspiration from local folklore, and culture of Thailand. While film's story end in itself, TV series are created with the mindset that the show will on air for a long period. TV series can be a collection of small self-contained stories that told across each episode or a long narrative story that told across multiples episodes or seasons. Using these extended times, TV series can create a deeper character development that can connect with viewers easier. Thai Horror benefit from these aspects of TV series a lot, as Thai Horror often reflect the society of Thailand, the story can feel natural and convincing.Notable TV series such as ปอบผีฟ้า (1997), สุสานคนเป็น (2002), เปรตวัดสุทัศน์ (2003), จันทร์เอ๋ยจันทร์เจ้า (2005), เพื่อนเฮี้ยน..โรงเรียนหลอน (2014), and 7 วันจองเวร (2015)

== Notable directors ==
- Nonzee Nimibutr
- Sompote Sands
- Yuthlert Sippapak
- Banjong Pisanthanakun
- Taweewat Wantha

== See also ==
- Cinema of Thailand
- Folk horror
- Ghosts in Thai culture
- Cambodian horror films
