= Tha Rae: The Exorcist =

- Promotional poster
- ท่าแร่
- Directed by: Taweewat Wantha
- Written by: Buddhiporn Bussabarati; Worawit Chaiwongkhod; Taweewat Wantha
- Produced by: Somsak Techaratanaprasert; Warunee Kasikitsakulpol
- Starring: Jirayu Tangsrisuk; Phiravich Attachitsataporn; Thaneth Warakulnukroh; Nichaphat Chatchaipholrat; Ongart Cheamcharoenpornkul; Sawanee Utoomma
- Cinematography: Saran Srisingchai
- Edited by: Saravuth Nakajad
- Music by: Terdsak Janpan; Banana Sound Studio
- Distributed by: Sahamongkol Film International
- Release date: 7 August 2025
- Running time: 120 minutes
- Country: Thailand
- Languages: Thai; Isan; Phu Thai

Tha Rae: The Exorcist (Thai: ท่าแร่, pronounced [[tʰâː rɛ̂ː]) is 2025 Thai supernatural horror film directed and co-written by Taweewat Wantha, starring Jirayu Tangsrisuk, Phiravich Attachitsataporn, Thaneth Warakulnukroh, Nichaphat Chatchaipholrat, Ongart Cheamcharoenpornkul, and Sawanee Utoomma. It is the first Thai film to feature an exorcism in the classic The Exorcist style.

== Storyline ==
At Tha Rae, the oldest and largest Catholic community in Thailand, a vicious demon that was defeated forty years ago has returned. Its reappearance begins when The Old Ming, a former priest, shows disturbing and horrifying behavior, spreading fear throughout the area. The villagers call upon Sopha, a local witch doctor who can communicate with spirits and perform spiritual healing based on traditional Isan beliefs, to conduct an exorcism.

Meanwhile, the Church dispatches Paolo, a priest specializing in demon banishment, to urgently contain the crisis. At the same time, Malee returns to Tha Rae to check on Ming, her father, only to find herself under attack by a hidden evil. As faiths from different worlds join forces against the terror, a dark truth about the community begins to surface, putting both life and belief on the line forever.

== Cast ==
- Jirayu Tangsrisuk as Paolo
- Phiravich Attachitsataporn as Sopha, yao the witch doctor
- Thaneth Warakulnukroh as Ming
  - Thuchapon Koowongbundit as Ming (young)
- Nichaphat Chatchaipholrat as Malee
- Ongart Cheamcharoenpornkul as Somchai
- Sawanee Utoomma as Saeng
- Jampa Saenprom as The Old Yao
- Arisara Wongchalee as Saengdao, Paolo's mother
- Chakkrit Wangpattanasirikul as Bishop

== Original soundtrack ==
- "Dao long tang" (ดาวหลงทาง; 'Nowhere Star'), ending theme by Kong HuaiRai

== Background and production ==
Tha Rae: The Exorcist is directed by Thaweewat Wantha, the filmmaker who rose to fame with the success of Death Whisperer (2023) and Death Whisperer 2 (2024), two supernatural horror films that achieved massive box-office success. He later turned down directing the third installment, saying he had run out of ideas. However, in 2025, he made a surprising return to the horror genre with two new films: Attack 13, released on 19 June, and Tha Rae: The Exorcist, released on 7 August. Both were produced by a studio different from the one behind Death Whisperer and its sequel.

The film is the first Thai movie to blend Christian beliefs with traditional Thai ghost folklore, two belief systems that are quite distinct from one another.

According Thaweewat, filming this movie was challenging every day and for every scene, especially the exorcism rituals performed by Sopha. These sequences were particularly difficult because they involve unfamiliar rituals that required extensive research. On set, the real yao, fluent in the Phu Thai language, participated to ensure accuracy. The possessed spirits had to display their powers while interacting with each yao, making each scene a careful mix of technique and ritual precision.

The production team also consulted with a real priest specializing in exorcism and used verified chants for the scenes. There was no improvisation. At times, the actors had almost no time to prepare and had to read the chants live on set because the language was complex. Every detail was carried out with the utmost respect for authenticity, making these scenes both terrifying and intensely ritualistic.

The church scenes were particularly delicate to film, as every activity inside the church required prior approval from the Vatican. Therefore, the production team recreated the church set, based on the real-life St. Joseph's Church in Nakhon Phanom. This set was used to depict the old church where Ming performs the exorcism for Saeng's daughter.

Most of the cast and crew are the same team behind the Death Whisperer Universe, which makes them familiar to the audience. Manita Chobchuen, who played the Woman in Black in both Death Whisperer films, also served as the acting coach for this project. The director explained that, compared to the Death Whisperer films, which he once described as a rollercoaster ride, Tha Rae: The Exorcist feels more like driving down a deserted road and running out of fuel. It is a type of horror where what lies ahead is frightening, but there is no way to turn back. It evokes a sense of emptiness, and at times, it might even feel like you could end up on a rollercoaster. This is exactly the kind of experience he intended to create.

In terms of the cast, Jirayu Tangsrisuk takes on the leading role as Father Paolo, marking a departure from his previous work in television dramas and period series to step into an action-horror film. His character demands a calm yet determined presence as a priest specializing in exorcisms. Jirayu admitted that he had never known of Tha Rae before, but upon visiting the real location he was deeply impressed by its unique mixed-culture atmosphere. Western-style houses stand alongside traditional Thai stilt houses, a church rises at the heart of the community amid enduring folk beliefs, and the town's urban layout follows an orderly Western grid. He was also struck by the Christmas Star Parade, a one-of-a-kind tradition found only in this community. Another highlight for him was acting alongside Phiravich Attachitsataporn, who plays Sopha, the yao (the witch doctor), a key character who serves as a spiritual healer for the villagers. Though the role was particularly challenging, Phiravich delivered a remarkable performance that adds vibrancy and depth to the story.

== Release ==
The film was screened in the Thai Visions, section of the 25th New York Asian Film Festival on 14 July 2026 and had its North American Premiere.

== Reception ==
On December 31, 2024, Facebook page Thailand Box Office and Entertainment released a teaser poster for the film, accompanied by the message that it was a new horror project from the director of Death Whisperer 2, which had grossed ฿800 million. The post quickly went viral, being shared over 5,100 times and receiving numerous comments from audiences eagerly anticipating the film. The poster drew particular attention because it featured the word "Tha Rae", well known as the largest and oldest Catholic community in Thailand, yet the image depicted a hand with painted nails and a Buddhist amulet necklace hanging from it.

Supat Sivapornpan of The Standard commented that, "although the opening of the story is engaging, as it progresses it gradually becomes rather ordinary. The main plot, which revolves around uncovering the origin of the demon possessing The Old Ming and Mali in order to defeat it, is not presented in a particularly striking way. Meanwhile, the film's depiction of Father Paolo and The Yao Sopha, investigating the case is not especially prominent, even though the two actors display strong on-screen chemistry".
