= Death Whisperer: Saming the Werebeast =

- Theatrical release poster
- Thai: ธี่หยด สมิงเขาขวาง
- Directed by: Thanadet Pradit; Narit Yuvaboon; Chalit Krileadmongkon
- Written by: Sorarat Jirabovornwisut; Thanadet Pradit
- Based on: Saming Khao Khwang by Krittanon
- Produced by: Surachedh Assawaruenganun; Narit Yuvaboon
- Starring: Nadech Kugimiya; Ongart Cheamcharoenpornkul; Maylada Susri
- Cinematography: Kritsadapol Samanukul
- Edited by: Supawit Buaket; Weerapat Tembundit
- Music by: Banana Sound Studio; Terdsak Janpan
- Production companies: Major Joint Film; BEC World; TBS Holdings
- Distributed by: M Studio
- Release date: September 30, 2026
- Running time: 111 minutes
- Country: Thailand
- Language: Thai

Death Whisperer: Saming the Werebeast (Thai: ธี่หยด สมิงเขาขวาง) is a 2026 Thai supernatural horror adventure film, starring Nadech Kugimiya, Ongart Cheamcharoenpornkul, Maylada Susri, directed by a collective of directors (Thanadet Pradi, Narit Yuvaboon, and Chalit Krileadmongkon). The film was released on September 30. It is a prequel spin-off to the Death Whisperer trilogy.

== Plot ==
Set in 1968 in the dense forests of Khao Khwang, Thong Pha Phum, Kanchanaburi, the story follows Thap, an intelligence officer from the Black Panthers Division, who disappears deep in the jungle. The authorities send a military unit to search for him. Khao Khwang is a dense tropical forest filled with countless dangers. The local villagers are terrified, believing that a large man-eating tiger known as Hong stalks the jungle. They say it is a Suea Saming, a supernatural tiger possessed by a demonic spirit, making it seemingly impossible to kill.

The mission is led by Sergeant Paphan, Major Rit, and Yak, a hot-headed, wisecracking young soldier. They are joined by Nampetch, a beautiful female forest ranger and the only woman in the deadly mission, and Sergeant Paphan's only daughter. Yak must therefore not only find the missing officer, but also protect Nampetch from the claws of the vicious tiger.

== Cast ==
- Nadech Kugimiya as Private Yak
- Maylada Susri as Nampetch
- Ongart Cheamcharoenpornkul as Sergeant Paphan
- Wichapas Sumettikul as Taywin
- Sahajak Boonthanakit as Major Rit
- Natthachai Sirinanthachot as Corporal Norm
- Chanintorn Jitpreeda as Corporal Wut
- Akarin Akaranitimaytharatt as Lieutenant Padet
- Pawarith Monkolpisit as Hunter Chat
- Shyno OK as Sergeant Chod
- Dan Chupong as Lieutenant Thap

== Production ==
Death Whisperer: Saming the Werebeast is based on the novel Saming Khao Khwang by Krittanon, which was published in 2019. The novel was developed from a story originally posted on Pantip.com in 2017. The story takes place in 1968, four years before the events of Death Whisperer in 1972. The film is again set in Kanchanaburi. It marks the first time that Yak and Sergeant Paphan meet, eventually developing into a partnership as they go on to hunt supernatural entities together in the two subsequent Death Whisperer films.

The film is once again directed by Thanadet Pradit, and Narit Yuvaboon, who also served as the directors of the Death Whisperer III in 2025. They are joined by Chalit Krileadmongkon, director of the 2022 giant-monster film Leio, who serves as an additional co-director, overseeing the film's special effects. He said, "We have to preserve the identity of Death Whisperer I–II. We don't want it to feel like a monster movie. Hong is more like a woman in black—a demon, an evil creature. Anyone who sees it would be terrified. We wanted to make this sming iconic. There have been countless versions of stories and films about the saming. So, if we wanted to create a version that people would remember, much like a woman in black, we had to brainstorm. We looked at countless references. We watched films like Jaws, Alien, and Predator. We realized that when we watched those movies, we were genuinely afraid of those creatures."

Behind the creation of Hong, the sming, the production team did not rely solely on CGI but also employed practical effects. They brought in a team that had previously worked on the Hollywood series Alien: Earth to create the practical effects, allowing the actors to see and interact with the sming physically before CGI was added to enhance the realism of its movements.

Furthermore, it was also the first Thai film to be screened in the ScreenX format.

== Promote ==
At the press conference for Death Whisperer III, the producers announced that Death Whisperer: Saming the Werebeast would be produced as a prequel to all three Death Whisperer films. The film is scheduled for release on September 30, 2026.

In mid-May 2026, the first poster was released, featuring Yak and Sergeant Paphan standing back-to-back, each holding a rifle, as though facing an unseen danger deep in the jungle. Later, in mid-August of the same year, the first official trailer was released, with a runtime of 1:34. The full-length trailer was released on September 10.

As the copyright holder, M Studio is proud to present Death Whisperer, the first chapter that started it all, airing on Channel 3 on September 20 at 5:30 PM, followed by Death Whisperer II on September 27 at 8:45 PM. The gala premiere was held at River Park on the G Floor of ICONSIAM, along the Chao Phraya river, on September 29, just one day before the film's official theatrical release.

To promote the film, a replica of the abandoned military camp in the forest featured in the film was constructed as part of an event titled Death Whisperer: Saming the Werebeast – The Experience. The event was held from September 23 to October 4, 2026, on the first floor of Seacon Square Hall at Seacon Square.

== Reception & criticism ==
On its opening day, the film grossed a total of ฿25 million nationwide, marking the lowest opening in the Death Whisperer universe. This may have been due to the fact that it was released at a time when the country was experiencing flooding. However, after the weekend, the film's total nationwide gross surpassed ฿100 million. In its second week of release, from October 8–11, the film remained at No. 1 at the Thai box office, grossing a total of ฿152.22 million nationwide. It earned ฿30.14 million during that week alone.

Regarding the reviews, Jean, a film critic and analyst from the YouTube channel Scoop Viewfinder, felt that the film was easy to watch, with a fast-paced and brisk storyline, and was better than Death Whisperer III. He thought that it felt like a repeat of Death Whisperer II, since both films feature a journey into the forest, hunting platforms, and an encounter with a saming. It is possible that Death Whisperer II was a combination of two of Krittanon's novels: Tee Yod...The End of Madness and Saming Khao Kwang. This is because the original novel does not contain a scene involving a journey into the forest or an encounter with the saming. As for the saming, speaking frankly and without sparing the filmmakers, he felt that it was not done well at all. In his view, it had not yet reached the level of an iconic monster, like the woman in black or Mae Nak Phra Khanong, as the filmmakers had intended. To him, every time the creature appeared, it seemed as though there might actually be several different ones, because its color kept changing. Moreover, when it appeared and displayed its supernatural powers, it did not really look like the demonic tiger described in the legends. Instead, it looked more like an ordinary ferocious tiger. The magical spells, which had been one of the charms of every Death Whisperer film, also felt noticeably bland and diminished in this film. Whenever a spell was cast, it simply turned into dust or mist. Nevertheless, he considered the film entertaining and enjoyable as long as viewers did not scrutinize it too closely. Personally, he gave the film a score of 6/10.
