= Kajbhunditt Jaidee =

Thai actor (born 1996)

- Born: July 12, 1996 (age 30); Bangkok Thailand
- Other name: Junior
- Education: Thammasat University
- Occupation: Actors
- Years active: 2021–present
- Agent: Channel 3 HD (2021–present)
- Notable work: Yos – Death Whisperer (2023)
- Height: 187 cm (6 ft 1 1/2 in)

Kajbhunditt Jaidee (Thai: กาจบัณฑิต ใจดี, born 12 July 1996) nickname Junior was a Thai actor under Channel 3 HD. He is known for his role as "Yos" in the movies Death Whisperer, Death Whisperer 2, Death Whisperer 3 and the role of "Pakrach" in the drama Kwanruethai.

== Biography ==
Kajbhunditt Jaidee graduated with a bachelor's degree from the Faculty of Science and Technology Thammasat University. Hobbies include playing football and boxing.

== Career ==
Kajbhunditt entered the entertainment industry through the invitation of his manager, Pae-Thotsapol Pengkaew, who worked as an entertainment reporter for Channel 3, who saw him at the Chula-Thammasat traditional football match, standing holding a flag behind Ryu-Wachirawit Wattanaphakdipaisan. His work in the entertainment industry began with modeling, commercials, and MV shooting. In 2021, he signed a contract to be an actor under Channel 3 HD and had his first drama that aired in 2022, "Love Forever After", playing the role of Than Than, a musical instrument businessman. Then in 2023, there was the drama "18 Mongkut Sadud Love".

== Filmography ==
=== Film ===
Year	Title	Roles	Studio
2023	Death Whisperer	Yos	Channel 3 HD and M STUDIO
2024	Death Whisperer 2	Yos	Channel 3 HD and M STUDIO
2025	Death Whisperer 3	Yos	Channel 3 HD and M STUDIO
