= Kijsada Paradise =

2026 film by Phontharis Chotkijsadarsopon

- Theatrical release poster
- Thai: กฤษดาพาราไดซ์
- Directed by: Phontharis Chotkijsadarsopon
- Screenplay by: Adirek Phothong; Sureewan Sirisapphokakun
- Produced by: Taweewat Wantha; Bung-orn Imaim; Apinan Moonchuea
- Starring: Nattawat Jirochtikul; Yongsin Wongpanitnont; Jaturawit Cheawprasit; Pannawit Phattanasiri; Worapat Pakapatpornpob; Sorathon Chaloemlapsombut; Waratthip Kittisiripaisan
- Cinematography: Arnon Chunprasert
- Edited by: Phunsunist Authsarwinikool; Phannipha Kabillikavanich; Muanfun Uppatham
- Music by: VelCurve Sound Studio; Ekkaphop Khiaoyasit; Pawares Ongprasert
- Production company: 13 Studio
- Release date: 11 June 2026 (Thailand)
- Running time: 113 minutes
- Country: Thailand
- Language: Thai

Kijsada Paradise (Thai: กฤษดาพาราไดซ์; RTGS: Kritsada Pharadai) is a 2026 Thai comedy horror film directed by Phontharis Chotkijsadarsopon (Mike), starring Nattawat Jirochtikul (Fourth) and Yongsin Wongpanitnont (Yorch). The film was produced by Taweewat Wantha (Kui) and the production company 13 Studio.

The film blends a story of friendship with horror, drawing inspiration from ghost stories about an abandoned water park in Chiang Mai. The film was released in theatres in Thailand on 11 June 2026. The film was made available for streaming on Netflix on 12 November 2026.

== Synopsis ==
Taek (Nattawat Jirochtikul) and his group of friends decide to play hide-and-seek at Kijsada Paradise, a haunted abandoned water park in Chiang Mai. However, the game leads to the mysterious disappearance of Jod (Jaturawit Cheawprasit), a friend in the group who has special needs. When they encounter what seems to be Jod, they are forced to play a deadly game from which no one can escape, facing the consequences of their past actions.

== Cast and characters ==
- Nattawat Jirochtikul (Fourth) as Taek
- Yongsin Wongpanitnont (Yorch) as Ohm
- Jaturawit Cheawprasit (Zen) as Jod
- Pannawit Phattanasiri (Garto) as Park
- Worapat Pakapatpornpob (Toey) as Tee
- Sorathon Chaloemlapsombut (JayJay) as Melon
- Waratthip Kittisiripaisan (Euro) as Waen
- Tirakun Srichoo as Pae
- Bhuripat Vejvongsatechavat (James) as Yoong
  - Suphach Tawsagun (Boky) as Yoong (young)
- Yasaka Chaisorn (Pu) as Guard
- Supapat Phoncharoenrat (Candy) as Pat
- Supoj Janjareon (Lift) as Ohm's father

== Soundtrack ==
Kijsada Paradise Soundtrack
No.	Title	Writer(s)	Artist	Length
1.	"Kijsada (กฤษดา)"	Sprite	Sprite	3:12

== Production ==
=== Development ===
After directing Death Whisperer and Death Whisperer 2 (2024), producer Taweewat Wantha (Kui) announced the launch of his film production company Thirteen Studio Co., Ltd., also known as 13 Studio, which focuses on producing thriller and horror films for the Thai market. Kijsada Paradise was one of the 7 films unveiled during the Knock Knock 13 Studio film lineup event at Siam Paragon on 17 January 2025.

The film was directed by Phontharis Chotkijsadarsopon (Mike), who previously directed the horror film franchise Pee Nak. The cast was revealed to feature Nattawat Jirochtikul (Fourth) and Yongsin Wongpanitnont (Yorch), along with Jaturawit Cheawprasit (Zen), Pannawit Phattanasiri (Garto), Worapat Pakapatpornpob (Toey), and Sorathon Chaloemlapsombut (JayJay).

Director Mike shared that got the idea for the film when he was told about an abandoned water park in Hang Dong district. He thought about how he had seen films about abandoned amusement parks before, but not about an abandoned water park. He went location scouting in Chiang Mai province to write the script, which took almost a year to develop. He added that Kijsada Paradise is a horror film about friendship and the coexistence of people with different backgrounds in society.

13 Studio made its market debut with the project at the Hong Kong International Film and TV Market (FilmArt) in March 2025.

=== Filming ===
Principal photography began on 1 February 2025. A blessing ceremony for good luck was held on 7 February 2025.

The film was shot almost entirely in Chiang Mai. As the film is packed with action, the actors underwent taekwondo workshops. They went on to perform their own fight scenes, including performing wire stunts, and filming underwater scenes. Some scenes required building a life-sized slide on a studio set to accommodate the action scenes and CGI. It was reported that strange occurrences occurred while filming, from accidents to injuries happening to the cast and crew. Director Mike returned to the location after filming to perform a ritual to ask for forgiveness.

== Marketing ==
A teaser poster for the film was released in April 2026. The official teaser for the film was released on 5 May 2026. The official trailer was released on 15 May 2026.

The film was promoted with a press conference held at SF World Cinema, CentralWorld on 12 May 2026. The film premiered at the Kijsada Paradise Gala Premiere event held at CentralWorld on 9 June 2026.
