= To Be Continued (Thai TV series) =

2024 Thai television series

- คุณได้ไปต่อ
- Genre: Boys' love Drama; Romance
- Based on: To Be Continued by Nottakorn
- Written by: May Piangpaitoon Satrawaha; Preechaya Prayongsap; Oubonpun Werajong
- Directed by: Kla Nathawat Piyanonpong
- Starring: Kajbhunditt Jaidee (Junior); Pongsapat Kankam (Fluke))
- Country of origin: Thailand
- Original language: Thai
- No. of seasons: 1
- No. of episodes: 8

Production
- Executive producer: Kittipat Jampa
- Editor: Namtoey Prairung Bhandngam
- Running time: 47 minutes
- Production company: Mandee Work

Original release
- Network: Channel 3
- Release: 19 February – 8 April 2024

To Be Continued (th:คุณได้ไปต่อ) is a 2024 Thai boys' love romantic drama television series directed by Kla Nathawat Piyanonpong and produced by Mandee Work for Channel 3. Based on the novel of the same name by Nottakorn, the series stars Kajbhunditt Jaidee (Junior) and Pongsapat Kankam (Fluke).

The series premiered on Channel 3 on 19 February 2024. Episodes were also released on 3Plus Premium and Netflix, with the latter distributing the series across eleven Southeast Asian countries.

== Synopsis ==
Achi has been secretly in love with Ji since high school. After the two begin a relationship, a misunderstanding separates them, prompting Achi to leave Thailand to study abroad.

Ten years later, Achi returns as a famous actor while Ji has become an orthopaedic surgeon. Reunited after years apart, the two must confront their unresolved feelings and decide whether they are ready to begin again.

== Cast ==
=== Main ===
- Kajbhunditt Jaidee (Junior) as Achi Achivich Thawithiraphaisal ("Achi")
- Pongsapat Kankam (Fluke) as Ji Jirawat Chot-hiran ("Ji")

=== Supporting ===
- Weerapat Onsa-ard as Ki
- Nakhun Rojanai as Kambee
- Thidarat Puerthong as Song
- Ratchapong Anomakiti as Peh
- Ornanong Panyawong as Ji and Ki's mother
- Lerwith Sangsith as Ji and Ki's father
- Passorn Leowrakwong as Achi's mother
- Puttachat Pongsuchat as Ratri
- Chanitcha Pimthong as Phrae
- Allyssa Ann Hines as Mona
- Uthanporn Van Paassen as Nim
- May Piangpaitoon Satrawaha as Nurse Ju
- Phutthiphan Phonloet as Dan
- Peerapun Chungcharoenpanich as Chanon

=== Guest ===
- Sirinchaya Boonsuwan as Nini (episode 1)
- Keetrakarn Doi as Cho (episode 1)

== Soundtrack ==
To Be Continued soundtrack
No.	Title	Writer(s)	Artist	Length
1.	"Pai Tor (ไปต่อ)"	Narongvit Techatanawat	Zee Pruk	3:30
2.	"Ro Thoe Bok Kham Wa Rak (รอเธอบอกคำว่ารัก)"	Narongvit Techatanawat	Tommy Sittichok	3:40
3.	"Start Again (เริ่มใหม่อีกครั้ง)"	Pinpin	FirstOne	3:47

== Production ==
To Be Continued is based on the bestselling online novel of the same name by Nottakorn, originally published on the Dek-D platform. Produced by Mandee Work in collaboration with Channel 3 and Domundi, it became the first boys' love series commissioned by Channel 3.

The series was directed by Kla Nathawat Piyanonpong, with Kittipat Jampa serving as executive producer. The screenplay was written by May Piangpaitoon Satrawaha, Preechaya Prayongsap and Oubonpun Werajong.

The series premiered on Channel 3 on 19 February 2024. Episodes were also made available on 3Plus Premium and Netflix, with Netflix distributing the series simultaneously in eleven Southeast Asian countries.

== Reception ==
Before its premiere, To Be Continued received considerable attention from the Thai media for becoming Channel 3's first boys' love series and for its simultaneous Netflix release across several Asian countries.

Following its debut, the series became a trending topic on Thai social media. Local media highlighted the chemistry between Kajbhunditt Jaidee and Pongsapat Kankam, as well as the adaptation's faithfulness to the original novel.

In a review published by TrueID, the series was praised for its faithful adaptation of the novel, the performances of the lead actors, and its balance of romance, drama and comedy.

== Fan meetings ==
Year	Date	Title	Country	Venue	Ref.
2024	28 April	To Be Continued Fan Meeting	Thailand	Major Cineplex Ratchayothin (Theater 13)	
2024	11 May	Junior Fluke 1st Fan Meeting in Taipei	Taiwan	Clapper Studio	
