= Muay Thai Chaiya =

- The Thai theatrical poster.
- Directed by: Kongkiat Khomsiri
- Written by: Kongkiat Khomsiri; Yossapong Phonsup
- Produced by: Charoen Iamphungporn; Apiradee Iamphungporn; Kiatkamol Iamphungphorn; Thanit Jitnukul; Tipwarin Nildum
- Starring: Akara Amarttayakul; Thawatchai Penpakdee; Sonthaya Chitmanee; Sarita Kongpech; Sangthong Ket-U-Tong
- Cinematography: Sayombhu Mukdeeprom
- Edited by: Phannipha Kabillikavanich; Sunit Asavinikul
- Music by: Giant Wave; Mongkol Pongwachirin; Pravit Kadkasem; Channasa Mattaphan
- Distributed by: Five Star Production (Thailand); Grindstone Entertainment Group (United States)
- Release date: August 30, 2007
- Running time: 116 minutes
- Country: Thailand
- Language: Thai

Muay Thai Chaiya or Chaiya (Thai: ไชยา) is a 2007 Thai drama film about two talented muay Thai boxers, boyhood friends whose lives take divergent paths after they arrive in Bangkok. The film is the solo directorial debut by Kongkiat Khomsiri, who had previously been among seven directors on Art of the Devil 2, and had written the screenplay for The Unseeable.

It premiered as the closing film at the 2007 Bangkok International Film Festival, and opened in wide release in Thailand cinemas on August 30, 2007.

== Plot ==
Growing up in Chaiya, Surat Thani Province, three boys, Piak, Pao and Samor, are followers of Pao's brother, Krang (Prawit Kittichanthira), a legendary Muay Thai fighter who is taught by Pao's father, Tew (Samart Payakaroon).

After an accident partially cripples Samor, Piak and Pao train as boxers under Tew, who teaches them the Muay Chaiya style, but the boxing school is broken up when Tew and Krang are recruited to a gym in Bangkok.

Eventually, Piak and Pao go to Bangkok themselves, bringing along Samor and Sripai, a nurse who is engaged to Piak, but whom Pao secretly loves. When they arrive, it is revealed that Tew has become a monk after Krangsuk committed suicide for being accused of throwing a fight.

Piak's skills in Muay Chaiya and hotheadedness make him a fierce fighter, but it is also a liability that costs him a fight and ends his career. He joins the world of underground bare-knuckle brawling, where he flourishes using his Muay Chaiya skills. He and Samor also take on other jobs in the criminal underworld, including helping out at the go-go bar where the pretty Warn dances and seduces Piak. While working in the criminal underworld, both of them end up also doing the dirty work for their boss. Sripai later finds Piak in bed with Warn and goes to find Pao. Pao and Sripai begin living together while Piak takes over the underground business once his boss is killed by another rival boss.

Meanwhile, Pao begins training with his father and works his way up the ranks. He is eventually put forward as a top boxer in a match against a fierce farang, Diamond Sullivan, who uses performance-enhancing drugs. This places Pao at odds with the gangsters whom Piak and Samor work for, Kru Paik. Pao loses the first fight with Diamond.

Piak and Samor are later tasked with killing Pao, but Piak intentionally shoots him non-fatally. Afterwards, he is arrested and sent to prison. At the same time, Pao is set up for a rematch with Diamond Sullivan but the gangsters whom Piak work for want Pao to throw the fight. If he does not, he will be killed. However, Samor has sent Pao a tape recording telling him to give it his all in the fight.

While being transferred, Piak is freed with help from Samor and the two set out to prevent another attempt on Pao's life. Samor sacrifices himself and sets off an explosive vest that kills some of the gangsters in a car. Piak rushes to Rajadamnern Stadium, where Pao's fight is being held and kills most of the other gang members.

Eventually the film culminates in Pao's second fight with Diamond. Pao is brutally beaten and knocked down several times, but comes out victorious, knocking Diamond out with the Muay Chaiya technique previously used by his brother, as he remembers the time the three of them trained together as young boys.

After Pao's victory, the boss orders his men to kill Pao but Piak captures him as the police surround him. Initially, Piak surrenders to the police as he is about to murder the crime boss, being compelled by Pao and Sripai. However, when the boss makes threats to Sripai and her daughter, Piak breaks free and fatally shoots him with a policeman's gun, in turn getting fatally shot himself. Piak dies surrounded by both Pao and Sripai.

The film ends with Pao, Sripai, and her daughter traveling back to Chaiya, where Pao scatters Piak's ashes into the ocean.

== Cast ==
- Akara Amarttayakul as Piak
- Thawatchai Penpakdee as Pao
- Sonthaya Chitmanee as Samor
- Sarita Kongpech as Sripai
- Sangthong Ket-U-Tong as Warn
- Prawit Kittichanthira as Krangsuk
- Samart Payakaroon as Tew
- Don Ferguson as Diamond Sullivan

== Production ==
Director Wisit Sasanatieng served as an uncredited art director on Muay Thai Chaiya.

== See also ==
- List of boxing films
