= Akara Amarttayakul =

Thai film and television actor

- อัครา อมาตยกุล
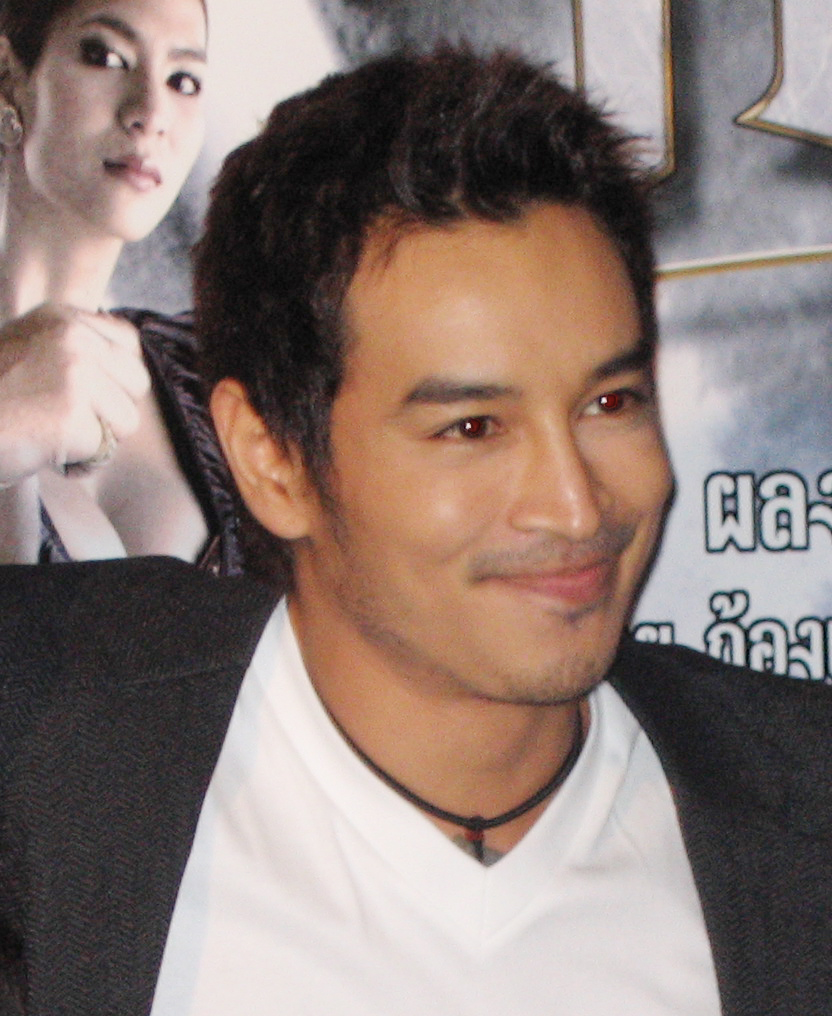
- Akara in 2007
- Born: Puttichai Amarttayakul; April 19, 1974 (age 52); Bangkok, Thailand
- Other name: Gof
- Education: Fashion Institute of Technology
- Occupations: Actor; singer
- Years active: 1991–2014; 2022

Akara Amarttayakul (Thai: อัครา อมาตยกุล, RTGS: Akkhara Amattayakun; born Puttichai Amarttayakul Thai: พุฒิชัย อมาตยกุล; April 19, 1974), nicknamed Gof, is a Thai actor and singer. He made his film debut in Euthana Mukdasanit's 1991 film, Vithi Khonkla, but the first feature film to star him was Mae bia (2001). Some of Akara's most notable works include Necromancer (2005) and Muay Thai Chaiya (2007). After his role in Spirit War (2014), Akara featured in no roles in both film and television before returning in 2022 for the Thai adaption of the South Korean television series, Bad Guys, as a supporting character. Akara also won several awards.

== Biography ==
Akara Amarttayakul was born as Puttichai Amarttayakul on 19 April 1974 in Bangkok, Thailand. Akara has a younger sister, Thanasorn Amarttayakul, who is a news anchor for Channel 3. At age 11, he moved to the United States, where he later graduated from the Fashion Institute of Technology, New York City.

While back in Thailand during a holiday, he was cast by director Euthana Mukdasanit in Vithi Khonkla in 1991. He made his debut feature film leading role in Mae bia (Snake lady), opposite Napakpapha Nakprasitte. Next was Saving Private Tootsie, portraying the young captain of a Royal Thai Army unit assigned to rescue some transvestite entertainers from a plane crash on the Myanmar border.

He was cast in a Thai television drama based on life of Mitr Chaibancha, He co-starred with Tata Young in the TV drama Plai Tien. In Jom kha mung wej, he portrayed a policeman who sets out to hunt down a criminal (Chatchai Plengpanich) skilled in black magic. The film won several awards in Thailand. Also in 2005, he was cast in The King Maker, an Anglo-Thai historical epic adapted from The Legend of Suriyothai story. Akara portrayed Pan Bud Sri Thep, the lover of Lady Si Sudachan. After undergoing extensive training and martial arts coaching for the role of Piak, a Muay Thai fighter, he starred in the 2007 drama film Muay Thai Chaiya. On 15 January 2011, he became the 105th person to imprint their hand and footprints at Landara.

From 2014 to 2022, Akara spent his time in both Thailand and the United States, where he attempted to try a business. After not 8 years of not starring in any film or television series, Akara returned for the 2022 series Bad Guys, which is a Thai adaption of the South Korean series of the same name.

== Filmography ==
=== Television ===
Year	Title	Role	Notes
2022	Bad Guys	In	Supporting Role
2010	Tum Ruad Lek	Ekaparb	Main Role
2009	Din Nam Lom Fai	Phasu	Main Role
2005	Mitr Chaibancha: Maya Cheewit	Mitr Chaibancha	Main Role
2003	Sai Lohit	Khun Krai	Main Role
2002	Plai Thien	Saentree Petchkla	Main Role

=== Film ===
Year	Title	Role	Notes
1991	Vithi Khonkla	Jormu	Supporting Role
2001	Mae bia (Snake Lady)	Chanachol	Main Role
2002	Saving Private Tootsie	Captain Sompong	Main Role
2005	Jom kha mung wej (Necromancer)	Santi	Main Role
2005	The King Maker	Phan Bud Sri Thep	Supporting Role
2006	Loveaholic	Raksa	Supporting Role
2007	Muay Thai Chaiya	Piak	Main Role
2010	The Intruder	Sadayu	
2010	Still	Arm	Main Role
2014	My House	Inn	Supporting Role
2014	Spirit War		Main Role
2023	The Djinn's Curse	Vin	Main Role
