= Maylada Susri =

Thai actress, model and singer (born 1996)

- เมลดา สุศรี
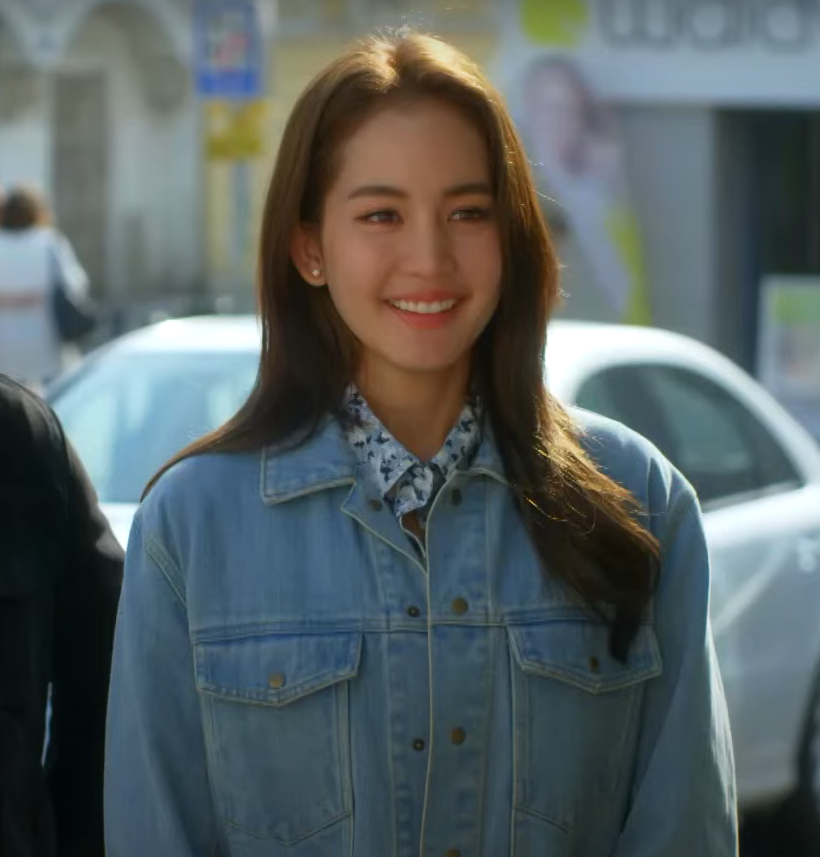
- Maylada in Eclipse of The Heart
- Born: Hathaipat Susri; 4 June 1996 (age 30); Bangkok, Thailand
- Other name: Bow Maylada
- Occupations: Actress; model; singer
- Years active: 2010–present
- Agents: Channel 7 (2014–2020); Channel 3 HD (2020–present)
- Height: 5 ft 9.3 in (1.76 m)
- Musical career
- Genre: Pop
- Instrument: Vocals
- Label: Kamikaze (2010–2013)
- Formerly of: Kiss Me Five
- Website: mayladasusri.ch7.com

Maylada Susri (Thai: เมลดา สุศรี; RTGS: Melada Susi, born 4 June 1996) nicknamed Bow (Thai: โบว์), is a Thai singer, actress and model. She was a singer in the girl group Kiss Me Five from 2010 to 2013. After winning Thai Supermodel Contest in 2013, she signed with Channel 7 to become one of their exclusive actresses until May 2020. In June 2020, she officially signed with Channel 3. She's known for her roles in Yai Kanlaya, Norah, Hong Neur Mongkorn 2017, Pachara Montra and Mon Garn Bandan Ruk.

== Career ==
Bow began her career by attending the Smart Kids Contest in 2004. In 2010, she debuted as a singer under Kamikaze as a member of the girl group Kiss Me Five, alongside Kitty Chicha, Bam Pakakanya, Gail Natcha and Mild Krittiya. When the group disbanded in 2013, she joined Thai Supermodel Contest in 2013 and finished in first place.. She later signed with Channel 7 where her first acting role was in the drama Khat Chueak, where she was acting alongside Mick Tongraya. However, her second drama Yai Kanlaya, where she was paired up with Michael Pataradet aired first and made both of them become famous and tied as "Koojin" (Fantasy Couple). She won various awards during her time in Channel 7.

In June 2020 she signed a contract with Channel 3. Her first drama was Monrak Nong Phak Kayaeng, where she paired up with Nadech Kugimiya.

On 2 December 2021, Maylada's new movie "OM! Cruch On Me!", an action drama, rom-com and fantasy movie, with James Jirayu Tangsrisuk, will be released.

== Filmography ==
=== Film ===
Year	Title	Role
2019	London Sweeties	Pron
2021	OM! Crush On Me! (อโยธยา มหาละลวย)	Or-Soy
2024	My Boo	Anong
2025	Snow White	Snow White (Dubbing)
2025	Death Whisperer 3	Namphet (cameo)
2025	My Boo 2	Anong
2026	Death Whisperer: Saming the Werebeast	Nampetch
2026	Gang Over	Nuch

=== Television series ===
Year	Title	Role	Network
2014–2015	Yai Kanlaya	Homnam	Channel 7
2015	Khat Cheuak	Lameiyn	Channel 7
2016	Norah	Norah	Channel 7
2017–2018	Hong Neur Mongkorn	Liu	Channel 7
2018	Khun Chai Kai Tong	Jieb	Channel 7
2018	Sa Kao Duen	Sakaoduen Ratchamaitree / Kratai	Channel 7
2019	Pachara Montra	Petch / Nampetch / Anchalee	Channel 7
2019	Mon Garn Bandan Ruk	Namneung / Diew	Channel 7
2019	Insee Daeng	Wat / Wassana	Channel 7
2021	Monrak Nong Phak Kayaeng	Chompoo	Channel 3
2023	Tai Ngao Tawan	Pareena	Channel 3
2024	Lok Mun Rohb Ther (The World Revolves Around You)	Tawan	Channel 3
2025	Khun Phi Jao Kha... Dichan Pen Han Mi Chai Hong (Good Heavens! I'm a Goose Not a Swan)	Jeed Nithra/Boonta	Channel 3

=== Music video appearances ===
Year	Song title	Artist	Music video
2010	"Follow U Follow Me"	Rookie BB	YouTube
2018	"Sharing Love With Our hands" UNICEF Project	CH7 New Gen	YouTube
2019	"สตั๊น (STUN)"	Yes'Sir Days Feat. โอ๊ต ปราโมทย์	YouTube
2020	ขอดูก่อน	The Mousses	YouTube
2020	I'm So Sorry	MIN	YouTube
2020	รอยยิ้มที่หัวใจ	ETC.	YouTube
2021	ทุกวันได้ไหม	NUM KALA Feat. Thongchai McIntyre	YouTube
2021	โอเครึเปล่า	Zentrady (feat. Kong Saharat)	YouTube
2023	My Ecstasy	Bright Vachirawit ft. D. Gerrard	

== Discography ==
=== Soundtrack appearances ===
Year	Title	Notes
2014	"อยากบอกรัก (Yaak Bok Rak)" (with Pataradet Sanguankwamdee)	Yai Kanlaya OST
2016	"โนห์รา (Norah)" (with Rangsiroj Panpeng)	Norah OST
2016	"คนจะรักกัน (Kon Ja Ruk Gan)" (with Pataradet Sanguankwamdee)	Norah OST
2017	"ไม่มีตรงกลาง (Mai Mee Trong Glang)"	Hong Nue Mang Korn OST
2018	"เขิน (Kern)" (with Phattharapon Dejpongwaranon)	Khun Chai Kai Tong OST
2018	"ฝันรัก (Fan Rak)"	Sa Kao Duen OST
2019	"ยิ่งใกล้ใจยิ่งสั่น (Ying Glai Jai Ying San)"	Pachara Montra OST
2019	"แค่จำได้ว่ารักกัน (Kae Jam Daai Waa Rak Gan)"	Mon Gard Bandan Ruk OST
2019	" ความลับของใจ (Khwam Lub Khong Jai)"	Insee Daeng OST
2021	"อีสานบ้านเฮา (Isan Ban Hao)" (with Nadech Kugimiya, Pusin Warinruk, Anusara Wantongtak, Danny Luciano, Nunnapas Radissirijiradech)	Monrak Nong Phak Kayaeng OST
2025	"รอจนพรจะมา (Lor Jon Pon Ja Ma)"	Snow White OST

== Awards and nominations ==
Year	Award	Category	Nominated work	Result	Ref.
2013	12th Thai Supermodel Contest	Thai Supermodel	—N/a	Won	
2015	9th Kazz Awards	Popular New Actress	Yai Kanlaya	Won	
2015	9th Kazz Awards	Best Couple (with Pattaradet Sa-nguankwamdee)	Yai Kanlaya	Nominated	
2015	Ministry of Public Health (Quit Smoking Campaign)	Honorary Plaque	—N/a	Won	
2015	8th Siam Dara Star Awards	Female Rising Actress	Khat Cheuak	Won	
2015	1st Maya Awards	Rising Star Award, Hot Female Star	Yai Kanlaya	Nominated	
2015	1st Maya Awards	Best Couple (with Pattaradet Sa-nguankwamdee)	Yai Kanlaya	Nominated	
2015	1st Maya Awards	Best OST (with Pattaradet Sa-nguankwamdee)	"อยากบอกรัก (Yaak Bok Rak)"	Won	
2015	Daradaily Digital Gen Awards	Best Digital Star of the Year	—N/a	Nominated	
2015	13th Seventeen Teen Choice Awards	Seventeen Choice Rising Star	Yai Kanlaya	Won	
2016	5th Daradaily the Great Awards	Hot Girl of the Year	—N/a	Nominated	
2016	National Spirits of Buddha Image	Honorary Plaque	—N/a	Won	
2016	2nd Maya Awards	Best Couple (with Pattaradet Sa-nguankwamdee)	—N/a	Nominated	
2016	9th Siam Dara Star Awards	Popular Female Star	—N/a	Nominated	
2016	9th Siam Dara Star Awards	Best Actress (TV)	Norah	Nominated	
2017	3rd Golden Kinnaree Awards	Outstanding Actress	Norah	Won	
2018	Star's Light Awards	Rising Actress Award	Hong Nue Mang Korn	Won	
2018	4th Maya Awards	Best Actress (TV)	Hong Nue Mang Korn	Nominated	
2018	3rd Dara Inside Awards	Best Couple (with Phattharapon Dejpongwaranon)	Khun Chai Kai Tong	Nominated	
2018	Thailand Good Person of the Year Awards	Rattanakosin Good Person Award	—N/a	Won	
2018	12th OK! Awards	Shipped Couple (with Phattharapon Dejpongwaranon)	Khun Chai Kai Tong	Nominated	
2018	1st White TV Awards	Outstanding Female Lead Actress	Hong Nue Mang Korn	Won	
2019	23rd Asian Television Awards	Best Actress in a Leading Role	Hong Nue Mang Korn	Nominated	
2019	6th Top Awards	Outstanding Actress	Mon Gard Bandan Ruk	Won	
2019	5th Maya Awards	Best Actress (TV)	Pachara Montra	Won	
2019	5th Maya Awards	Charming Girl	—N/a	Nominated	
2019	4th Dara Inside Awards	Popular Actress	Pachara Montra	Nominated	
2020	4th JOOX Thailand Music Awards	Thailand's Female Sweetheart	—N/a	Nominated	
2020	14th Kazz Awards	Rising Actress Award	Insee Daeng	Nominated	
2020	6th Maya Awards	Best Actress (TV)	Insee Daeng	Nominated	
2020	6th Maya Awards	Best Couple (with Mik Thongraya)	Mon Gard Bandan Ruk	Nominated	
2020	6th Maya Awards	Charming Girl	—N/a	Won	
