= Taweewat Wantha =

Thai filmmaker

- ทวีวัฒน์ วันทา
- Born: Bangkok
- Other name: Kui
- Occupations: Film director; screenwriter; producer; actor
- Years active: 2004–present

Taweewat Wantha (Thai: ทวีวัฒน์ วันทา) is a Thai film director, screenwriter, film producer, actor, best known for Death Whisperer (2023) and Death Whisperer 2 (2024).

== Early life ==
Taweewat (nickname: Kui) was born and raised in the suburbs of Bangkok and had a passion for watching films and television dramas from an early age, particularly horror films. One of his most vivid childhood memories was watching Thai horror movies broadcast on Channel 7 every Friday night, in a program similar to Big Cinema. His entire family would gather together to watch, building a pillow fort to create a sense of adventure, turning it into a family ritual. This experience later became an important source of inspiration for his own work.

He was also influenced by the works of many filmmakers, such as E.T. (1982) by Steven Spielberg, crossovers like Jumborg Ace & Giant (1974) and Hanuman and the Five Riders (1975) by Sompote Sands, as well as the action-packed, stunt-driven films of Chalong Pakdeevijit.

He started out as an audiovisual staff member at a kindergarten.

== Film career ==
Taweewat began his journey into filmmaking after winning a short film competition hosted by Fat Radio with his film SARS Wars. The work was later expanded into a feature film of the same name in 2004. Blending elements of action, comedy, fantasy, and horror, it represents a new dimension in Thai cinema.

In his early career, his works were often cult films that struggled to reach a wide audience and rarely performed well at the box office; besides SARS Wars, this also included The Sperm (2007).

He rose to prominence with Death Whisperer, a supernatural horror film based on a storyline claimed to be drawn from true events of the past. The film was a major success, earning more than ฿200 million and becoming the second highest-grossing Thai film of that year. Its sequel, Death Whisperer 2 released the following year, was even more successful, grossing around ฿800 million.

For both Death Whisperer films, he openly admitted drawing inspiration from the popular Evil Dead franchise. This resulted in a distinctive mix of horror, action, and outrageous dark comedy that became his signature style.

Following the success, Major Joint Film and BEC World, the production companies, invited him to direct Death Whisperer 3. However, he declined, stating that he had run out of ideas to continue the story.

In early 2025, he founded his own studio under the name 13 Thirteen Studio, focusing on horror productions directed by a variety of filmmakers. The studio plans to release works on a regular basis, including Attack 13, First Camping, Kijsada Paradise, Scarua The Movie, Dawn of Soengsang, Raeng Wat Saket, Pret Wat Suthat, Home Sweet Home Return.

== Filmography ==
=== Director ===
==== Films ====
- SARS Wars (Khun krabii hiiroh) (2004) (co-writer)
- The Sperm (Asujaak) (2007) (co-writer)
- Kindergarten War (Anuban Dek-Khong) (2009)
- Fireball (Ta chon) (2009) (only co-writer)
- Long Weekend (Thongsook 13) (2013) (co-writer)
- Death Whisperer (Tee Yod) (2023)
- Death Whisperer 2 (Tee Yod 2) (2024) (cameo)
- Attack 13 (2025)
- Tha Rae: The Exorcist (2025) (co-writer)

==== Television series ====
- Jud Nut Pop (2015)
- Sai Lub Rak Puan (2016)
- Por Krua Hua Pa (2017)
- My Sweet Assassin (aka Bloody Moon) (2022)
- Khru Phensri and Ghoul Lady (2023)
- 6th Sense Agency (2024)
- The Legend of Nang Nak (2024)
- Thieves of Hearts (2025)
