= Art of the Devil 3 =

- One of several Thai film posters.
- Directed by: Pasith Buranajan; Kongkiat Khomsiri; Isara Nadee; Seree Phongnithi; Yosapong Polsap; Putipong Saisikaew; Art Thamthrakul
- Written by: Kongkiat Khomsiri; Yosapong Polsap
- Produced by: Kiatkamon Iamphungporn; Aphiradee Iamphungporn; Seree Phongnithi; Tipwarin Nildum
- Starring: Napakpapha Nakprasitte; Supakorn Kitsuwon; Namo Tongkumnerd; Paweena Chariffsakul
- Cinematography: Chitti Urnorakankij
- Edited by: Sunit Asavinikul; Phannipha Kabillikavanich
- Distributed by: Five Star Production
- Release date: 3 April 2008
- Running time: 84 minutes
- Country: Thailand
- Language: Thai

Art of the Devil 3 (Thai: ลองของ 2 or Long khong 2) is a 2008 Thai horror film directed by Kongkiat Khomsiri, Art Thamthrakul, Yosapong Polsap, Putipong Saisikaew, Isara Nadee, Pasith Buranajan and Seree Pongniti (known collectively as the "Ronin Team"). It was released by Five Star Production.

A prequel to the 2005 film Art of the Devil 2 and a sequel to Panor 2 (2026), the film fills in the back story of Miss Panor, portrayed by Napakpapha Nakprasitte, who turns to black magic to exact revenge upon her tormentors.

== Plot ==
The film opens with a magician, Dit, torturing his former master and demanding the 'Third Eye', which will make him a full disciple of the Three-Eyed God. The master warns that Dit cannot handle all the black magic he's absorbed. Ignoring the warning, Dit stabs his former master in the forehead and tries to dig out the Third Eye, but the old man does not seem to have it, leaving Dit to kill him. Later, Dit is in his hotel room, bathing in reeds and herbs, trying to heal a rotting wound on his stomach, caused by too much black magic devouring him from the inside out. Despite this, the wound festers and grows larger.

In a hospital, Aajaan Panor is strapped to a bed in the psychiatric ward, as her nurse and doctor look on. The doctor prescribes a change in medication, claiming that it will not harm Miss Panor's unborn child. The nurse is a woman named Pen, who is Ta's aunt and is also newly pregnant. Pen's husband, Aod, later arrives at the hospital to pick her up, and together they drive to the train station to get Ta.

Ten years ago, Panor had tutored both Pen and Ta. Ta's father, Prawase, falls in love with Panor; in order to marry her, he poisons his first wife, Duen. Ta's grandfather and great-grandmother enlist Dit's help to bring Duen back to life by transferring her soul into a new body. Using Ta's blood as a conduit, they encourage him chant the sutra, but he is too nervous, and the ritual fails. In the present day, Ta has returned home to spend some time with his family, and they hope that he will be able to complete the ceremony this time around. The family again hires Dit to help them.

Pen takes Panor from the hospital and brings her to the family barn, where Ta's grandfather has preserved Duen's corpse in salt. As the ritual begins, Pen straps Panor into stirrups and removes her fetus. As Panor struggles, Dit sees the Third Eye bulging from her forehead, and decides he must get it at all costs. Ta chants the sutra successfully, Panor's soul is torn from her body and trapped in a mirror, and Duen's soul settles into Panor's body. Dit ties a red string around Duen/Panor's wrist and says that it will help attach the old soul to this new body. Aod goes to bury the fetus and mirror at the base of a small shrine, but is spooked by some noises in the jungle and runs off, leaving everything behind. Meanwhile, the Third Eye is causing Duen/Panor to experience some creepy visions—mostly corpses of people slain in the name of black magic. While arguing with some of these invisible creatures, the red string falls off her wrist.

Duen/Panor next goes to a secret hut in the jungle where she has tied up her husband, Prawase. She reveals that she is Duen in Panor's body, and accuses him of trying to abandon her. She tortures him by tearing out his toenails. When she leaves the hut, Prawase gets loose and shoots himself in the head. Deep in the jungle, Duen's soul starts to come loose from Panor's body, and she fights with Dit to keep both pieces together. In their struggles, the mirror containing Panor's soul is broken, Duen's soul is evicted, allowing Panor's to return and Dit runs away. At this exact moment, Ta's great-grandmother starts screaming that the family is about to be destroyed by a ghost.

In the barn, Panor ties Ta's grandfather to a chair and lays out some black magic accoutrements. Panor then pins his eyes open with safety pins, then rubs salt on them, then claims that she will make the grandfather watch the death of his whole family.

Using her black magic (and the extra power of the Third Eye), Panor causes Ta's great-grandmother to stab herself in the ear with a metal spike. In the ensuing panic, Aod hears Pen calling for him, and rushes outside to see a vision of her, bleeding. Following the vision to the village windmill, Panor's magic enchants a rope that becomes a noose and encircles his neck. Pen and Ta both arrive and try to save Aod, but they cannot fight the windmill, and Aod is strangled.

Back in the barn, Panor instructs the grandfather to call out to Ta and Pen, and proceeds to drip hot wax into his eyes. Pen and Ta come running, but she causes them to lose their way. Panor uses her magic to cause Pen's fetus to swell up and explode out of her body. Ta finds her body and is faced with a vision of Panor, then attempts to attack her with a stick, but it passes through her body. Dit arrives and stabs Panor's spirit with a magic knife, demanding that she gives him the Third Eye in the process. Proving too powerful for him, she pushes Dit away and causes his ever-growing stomach wound to completely consume his chest.

Ta flees and finally reaches the barn, where his grandfather is sitting at a table with the corpses of his family gathered around him. Panor arrives and captures Ta, then burns off his skin with a blow torch (as seen in the previous film). One last flashback reveals that while Panor was a child, she visited a monk to create a spell that would make any man she encountered become attracted to her as she had been bullied by her classmates for her looks.

The film ends with the coda 'One Year Later', and shows Ta meeting his five school friends at the train station, thus beginning Art of the Devil 2.

== Film festivals ==
- 2008 Fantastic Fest
- 2008 Fantasia Festival
