= Pongsapat Kankam =

Thai actor (born 1996)

- พงศภัทร์ กันคำ
- Born: Pongsapat Kankam; 1 September 1996 (age 30); Chiang Rai, Thailand
- Other name: Fluke
- Education: Sripatum University
- Occupation: Actor
- Years active: 2017–present
- Known for: Dream in My Dream; Ji in To Be Continued
- Height: 1.85 m (6 ft 1 in)

Pongsapat Kankam (Thai: พงศภัทร์ กันคำ; born 1 September 1996), professionally known as Fluke (ฟลุ๊คจ์), is a Thai actor signed under Channel 3. He became known for portraying Dream in the BL series My Dream (2018) and Ji Jirawat Chot-hiran in the series To Be Continued (2024).

== Biography and career ==
Pongsapat Kankam was born in Chiang Rai, Thailand, on 1 September 1996. He completed his secondary education at Samakkhi Witthayakhom School and graduated with a degree in Communication Arts from Sripatum University in 2020.

He is the eldest child in his family and has one sister and two younger brothers. One of them is actor Pantach Kankham, professionally known as Garfield, who is signed under CHANGE2561.

Pongsapat Kankam made his acting debut in 2017 in the film The Promise, portraying the character Fluke. In 2018, he landed his first leading role as Dream in the BL series My Dream, which aired on LINE TV.

In 2020, he joined the cast of the television series Art of the Devil, the television adaptation of the film franchise of the same name, portraying Brave. In the same year, he appeared in the series God of Love, broadcast on Channel 7, as Diao. In 2021, he portrayed Jes in the Thai adaptation of My Sassy Girl, which aired on True4U. The following year, he starred in the series Dear Makkalee as Annawa.

In 2024, he starred in the BL series To Be Continued, an adaptation of Nottakorn's novel of the same name, produced by Mandee Work for Channel 3.

In 2026, Pongsapat was confirmed as one of the lead actors in the series My Secret Boyfriends, produced by Wabi Sabi Studio, portraying James.

== Filmography ==
=== Television ===
| Year | Title | Role | Billing | Network / Platform | Ref. |
|---|---|---|---|---|---|
| 2018 | My Dream | Dream | Lead role | LINE TV | |
| 2020 | Art of the Devil | Brave | Supporting role | Channel 3 | |
| 2020 | God of Love | Diao | Supporting role | Channel 7 | |
| 2021 | My Sassy Girl | Jes | Supporting role | True4U | |
| 2022 | Dear Makkalee | Annawa | Lead role | Channel 3 | |
| 2024 | To Be Continued | Ji Jirawat Chot-hiran | Lead role | Channel 3; 3Plus Premium; Netflix | |
| 2026 | My Secret Boyfriends | James | Lead role | iQIYI | |

=== Film ===
| Year | Title | Role | Billing |
|---|---|---|---|
| 2017 | The Promise (เพื่อน..ที่ระลึก) | Fluke | Lead role |
| 2021 | Love Spell | Kaew | Supporting role |

== Fan meetings ==
| Year | Date | Event | Country | Venue | Ref. |
|---|---|---|---|---|---|
| 2024 | 28 April | To Be Continued Fan Meeting | Thailand | Major Cineplex Ratchayothin (Theater 13) | |
| 2024 | 11 May | Junior Fluke 1st Fan Meeting in Taipei | Taiwan | Clapper Studio | |

== Awards and nominations ==
| Year | Award | Category | Work | Result | Ref. |
|---|---|---|---|---|---|
| 2024 | Y Entertain Awards | Prince of Boy's Love | To Be Continued | Nominated | |
| 2024 | Y Entertain Awards | Rising Star Couple (with Kajbhunditt Jaidee) | To Be Continued | Nominated | |
