= Piyapan Choopetch =

Thai film director and screenwriter

- ปิยะพันธ์ ชูเพ็ชร์
- Occupations: Film director; screenwriter
- Notable work: Necromancer

Piyapan Choopetch (Thai: ปิยะพันธ์ ชูเพ็ชร์) is a Thai film director and screenwriter. His films include Necromancer and Vow of Death.

== Filmography ==
=== Director ===
1. Necromancer (Jom kha mung wej) (2005)
2. Vow of Death (Phii mai jim fun) (2007)
3. My Ex (Fan kao) (2009)
4. My Ex 2: Haunted Lover (Fan mai) (2010)

=== Screenwriter ===
1. Necromancer (Jom kha mung wej) (2005) (co-written with Kittikorn Liasirikun)
