= Mae Bia =

Mae bia
- The Thai theatrical poster.
- Directed by: Somching Srisuparp
- Produced by: Visute Poolvoralaks'
- Starring: Napakpapha Nakprasitte; Akara Amarttayakul
- Distributed by: Tai Entertainment
- Release date: March 9, 2001
- Country: Thailand
- Language: Thai

Mae bia (Thai: แม่เบี้ย, or The Snake Lady) is a 2001 Thai romance-horror film directed by Somching Srisuparp and starring Napakpapha Nakprasitte and Akara Amarttayakul.

== Plot ==
Chanachol, recently returned to Thailand after living overseas, signs up for a tour to get back in touch with Thai culture, and finds himself attracted to the tour guide, Mekhala.

There are several problems with the relationship: Chanachol is married, with family, and Mekhala has a mysterious, symbiotic relationship with a deadly cobra, and many of her previous suitors have ended up dead. And the snake will come after Chanachol and kill him once and for all. Then Mekhala became so heartbroken she committed suicide by submerging herself in the very deep klong and never lived again. However, she appears again near the end of the film again as a tour guide on an antique tour boat. She meets the younger brother who introduces her to another officer in the family business. The man is entranced by her and her expression indicates she will love and her cobra will kill again.

== Cast ==
- Napakpapha Nakprasitte as Mekahala
- Akara Amarttayakul as Chanachol
- Chotiros Kaewpini as Mai Kaew
- Apinan Pra as Poj
- Surang Sae-ung as Nuan
- Natsawas Mansap as Kosum
