= Bitter Sweet (2009 film) =

Bitter/Sweet
- Directed by: Jeff Hare
- Written by: Urs Brunner; Jeff Hare
- Produced by: Urs Brunner; Jon Karas
- Starring: Kip Pardue; James Brolin
- Production companies: Angel & Bear Productions; 8th Wonder Entertainment; Capitol Motion Pictures
- Release date: 2009
- Running time: 105 minutes
- Countries: United States; Thailand
- Language: English

Bitter/Sweet is a 2009 romantic comedy film. The film showed at the Houston International WorldFest where it won best picture and best director for Jeff Hare. The film was distributed by Worldwide Film Entertainment.

== Premise ==
Brian Chandler (Kip Pardue), an American businessman, is sent to Thailand by his boss, coffee mogul Calvert Jenkins (James Brolin) in search of local coffee beans to purchase. Upon arrival to Thailand, Brian is met by Ticha (Napakpapha Nakprasitte) who becomes his guide, as he finds more than just coffee, and finds out what the original purpose of his trip is.

== See also ==
- List of American films of 2009
