= Natthachai Sirinanthachot =

- Born: 1988; Bang Rak, Bangkok, Thailand
- Other names: Birth (เบิร์ธ); Birth Natthachai (เบิร์ธ ณัฐชัย)
- Education: Wat Rajabopit School; Rajamangala University of Technology Rattanakosin (RMUTR)
- Occupations: Actor; comedian; TV commercial actor; content creator
- Years active: 2010–present
- Height: 174 cm (5 ft 9 in)

Natthachai Sirinanthachot (Thai: ณัฐชัย สิรินันทโชติ, nicknamed: Birth) is a Thai actor, he is best known for his appearances in numerous television commercials and supporting roles in various television dramas.

== Biography & careers ==
Born into a Thai-Chinese family in the Bang Rak area, near Banthat Thong Road. After his parents separated, Natthachai went to live with his grandmother on the Thonburi side of Bangkok. He completed his secondary education at Wat Rajabopit School.

From an early age, he had never dreamed of becoming an actor, nor had he ever considered entering the entertainment industry. During his childhood, while living with his grandmother, he would often watch television dramas with her when she was drunk. She would frequently say, "Other people's children and grandchildren get to appear on television and perform, so why don't any of mine do that?" At one point, he also lived with his maternal aunt, whose child wanted to become an actor. His cousin regularly performed in school plays, attended commercial auditions, and went to casting sessions. Even so, none of this made him want to become an actor himself. However, when watching television commercials, he had a habit of imitating the behavior and mannerisms of the people he saw. This eventually became the foundation of his own approach to acting. He never had a particular actor as a role model, nor did he ever receive any formal acting training.

After graduating from university, he began working as an ordinary office employee, earning a modest salary. His entry into the entertainment industry came unexpectedly in 2010, when he auditioned for a television commercial for Nature Gift, a brand known for its weight-loss coffee products. The commercial was directed by Thanonchai Sornsriwichai, one of Thailand's most acclaimed and experienced commercial directors. He passed the audition with a style of comedy that came naturally to him: deadpan, understated, and subtly mischievous. His humor was distinctly different from the more traditional, exaggerated style commonly associated with Thai stand-up comedy.

His approach to acting was simple but remarkably expressiv. "Paid a hundred, performed for a million". He had a tendency to give far more to a role than was expected, turning even the smallest gesture or reaction into something memorable.

By 2025, he had appeared in more than 200 television commercials. Some of these productions were filmed overseas, including in Japan and Hong Kong. The commercial role that brought him the most recognition and remains the one most fondly remembered by audiences was his appearance in a Dutch Mill Dna soy milk commercial in 2012. He played an office employee named Phong, who was instructed by his boss to contact another employee named Ae. In the commercial, Phong speaks rapidly and energetically, repeatedly urging Ae to hurry up with the now-famous line, "Ae, run! Ae, run!" His fast-paced delivery and deadpan yet mischievous performance made the character highly memorable, and the commercial became one of his most widely recognized advertising roles.

In addition to his acting career, he is also the owner of the Facebook page #ผ่าม, which produces short, humorous skits and comedy content. The page has approximately 1.5 million followers.

== Personal life ==
He was married, but later divorced his wife. The couple have one daughter together, with his former wife receiving custody of their daughter in 2018.

== Partial filmography ==
Film

- Mr.hurt as Don's boss (2010)
- Oh...My Wife as Jack (2024)
- Love or Lie as Ko (2025)
- Death Whisperer: Saming the Werebeast as Cpl. Norm (2026)

Television series

- Toong Sanaeha as Ko (2020)
- 55:15 Never Too Late (2021)
- My Friend, the Enemy as Kong (2022)
- Duangjai Dhevaprom (episode: Porncheewan) as Chid (2024)

Stage

- The Overture the Musical as Tiew (2025)
