= Napakpapha Nakprasitte =

Thai actress

- นภคปภา นาคประสิทธิ์
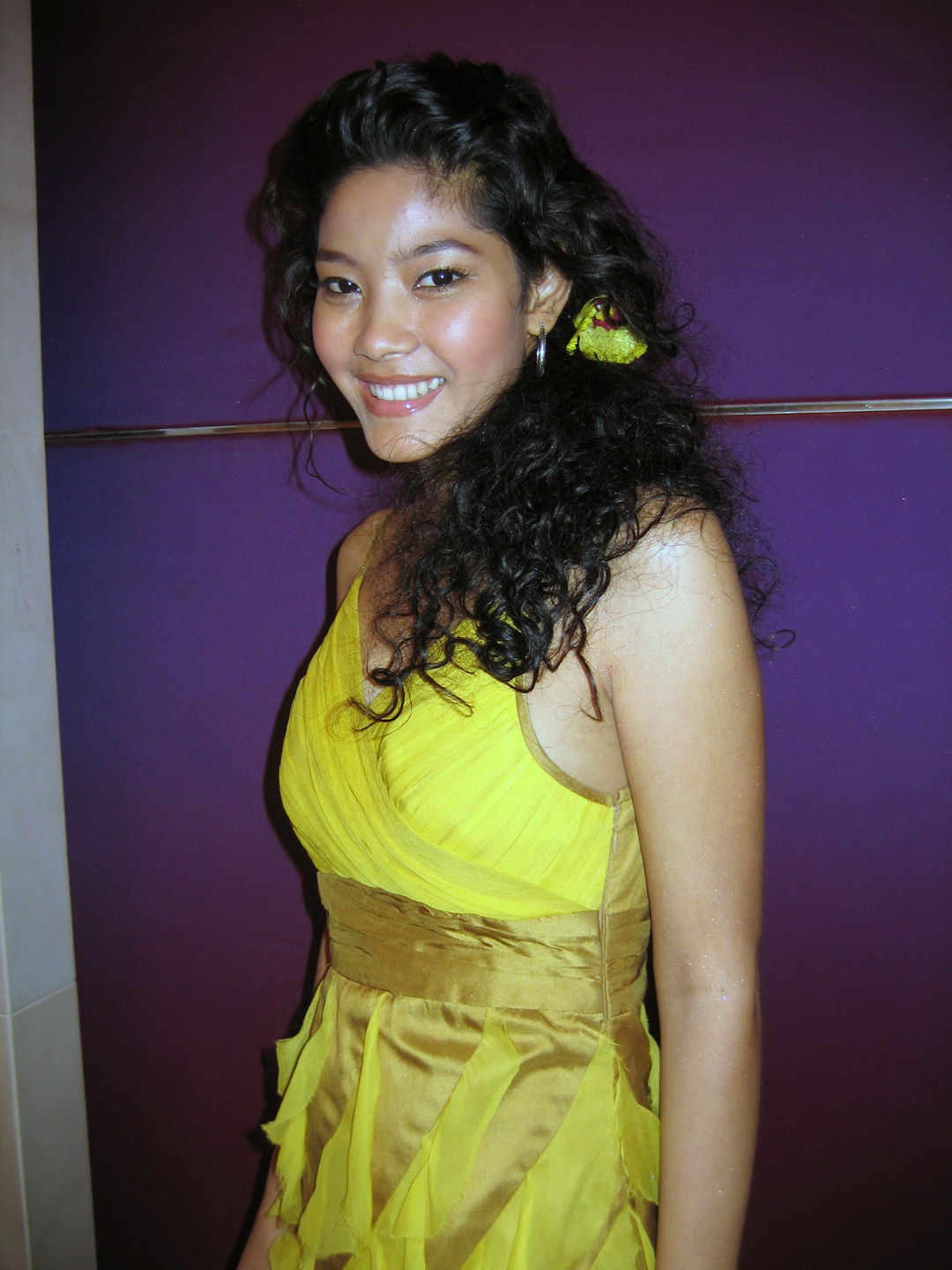
- Mamee at the awards banquet for the 2007 Bangkok International Film Festival.
- Born: April 19, 1981 (age 45); Bangkok, Thailand
- Other names: Napakapa Nakprasit; Mamee
- Occupation: Actress
- Years active: 2001—present

Napakpapha Nakprasitte (Thai: นภคปภา นาคประสิทธิ์; RTGS: Naphakpapha Nakprasit, and better known as Mamee, born April 19, 1981) is a Thai film actress. She is sometimes credited as Napakapa Nakprasit. She is known for the role of Malunaï in the movie ‘The Burma Conspiracy’ and many more.

== Education ==
Dhurakij Pundit University

== Career ==
Mamee's first film role was as the star of the 2001 horror film, Mae bia (Snake Lady), in which she portrayed a woman who has a symbiotic relationship with a cobra. She then starred in Butterfly Man, an Anglo-Thai production directed by Kaprice Kea where she portrayed a traditional Thai masseuse who becomes the love object for a young British backpacker, portrayed by Stuart Laing. It was her first English-speaking role.

In 2005, Mamee starred in Art of the Devil 2, a thriller in which she portrayed a teacher at a rural school who has a cruel prank played on her by some students. She then gets her revenge by learning black magic and using it on her former students. For her role in Art of the Devil 2, she was nominated for best actress by the Bangkok Critics Assembly. She was also nominated for best supporting actress for the Thailand National Film Awards, but asked that the nomination be withdrawn out of protest.

Mamee was featured in an experimental Thai film titled Ma-Mee (Three Friends), a partly fictional docu-drama in which she and two of her bikini-clad girlfriends (Jitraporn Panit and Penporn Poonsaem) go to an island for a video shoot, with the camera following their activities both on the set and off.

She was listed among the cast for the 2006 Canadian horror-comedy, 1st Bite, by Malaysian-Canadian director Hunt Hoe.

She starred in Art of the Devil 3 in 2008.

In 2011, she played Malunaï in "The Burma Conspiracy" (2011) also known as Largo Winch II, starring Tomer Sisley and Sharon Stone.

== Filmography ==
- 2001 - Mae bia (Snake Lady)
- 2002 - Butterfly Man
- 2004 - Jao saao Pad Thai
- 2005 - Long khong (Art of the Devil 2)
- 2005 - Ma-mee (Three Friends)
- 2006 - 1st Bite
- 2008 - Long khong 2 (Art of the Devil 3)
- 2009 - Bitter/Sweet
- 2011 - Largo Winch II
