= My Ex 2: Haunted Lover =

My Ex 2: haunted Lover
- Theatrical poster
- Directed by: Piyapan Choopetch
- Written by: Adirek 'Uncle' Watleela; Piyapan Choopetch
- Produced by: Ong-Art Singlumpong; Komvit Chetchotisak; Adirek 'Uncle' Watleela
- Starring: Ratchawin Wongviriya; Atthama Chiwanitchapan; Thongpoom Siripipat; Marion Affolter; Pete Thongjua
- Cinematography: Nattawut Kittikhun
- Edited by: Pitipong Suppapong; Adirek 'Uncle' Watleela
- Music by: Thippatai Pirompak
- Production companies: Forfilms Co., Ltd.
- Distributed by: Film R Us
- Release date: 3 February 2010
- Running time: 86 minutes
- Country: Thailand
- Language: Thai

My Ex 2: Haunted Lover (แฟนใหม่) is a 2010 Thai horror film, a sequel to My Ex.

== Synopsis ==
After watching My Ex, Cee and her friends are chatting about the movie. Her older sister, Bowie, who is a famous actress, stated that a sequel was in the works. Afterwards, Cee catches her boyfriend with Ying, who was the daughter of a hotel owner, revealing that he is a playboy. While watching the movie together, we see a premonition of Cee throwing a drink in Aof's face when she tries to call him. We see a flashback of Aof and Cee in bed playing around with a Rubik's Cube. One night, Aof tells Cee that he lost all his money in a football bet and begged Ying to rely on him. Once Ying comes home, she sees Aof and Cee together and leaves the room. Cee slaps Aof and leaves. Ying is later found dead in a pool of blood, discovered by Aof. She had apparently jumped from the building.

The next day Aof calls Cee about Ying's death and tries to apologize to her about giving her a second chance but she hangs up on him. Cee and Bowie meet Bowie's producer friend, Karn, who is a rich resort owner and the producer of Cee's debut film after she got a part in the horror film.

The sisters, and their friend go to the film set in Koh Chang to enjoy the holidays. Things started to go wrong when Cee sees Ying's ghost and her friends are killed by a truck. Cee finds out that Aof is the prime suspect in Ying's death. Cee and Bowie are caught in a love triangle with Karn.

A flashback shows that Cee was directly responsible for Ying's death, and Aof was framed by Cee for Ying's murder. Aof confronts Cee and tries to hold her in his arms, but she kills Aof with a knife and hit his head with a stone in the room. Not long after, Bowie came back into their room and found Aof's corpse on the floor. Cee recalls that when she was a child, Bowie often tormented her by tearing up her doll, and now, Cee stated that her sister was trying to steal Karn from her too. Cee killed Bowie with the stone.

Karn returns to the hotel and saw that the power was down and told the staff to repair it. But when he goes to see Cee and Bowie in their room, Cee got a hallucination from Ying's ghost, and mistaking Karn for Ying's ghost, stabbed him with the knife to his chest.

There was a huge storm raging outside as Cee struggled to a nearby forest to dig a large grave to bury the three corpses when she sees Ying coming for her. She wakes up and realised that she was just having a nightmare in the hotel room. However, she really did kill Aof, Bowie and Karn. She walks towards the gravesite where it was surrounded by people and the police were already there digging out the bodies. She was horrified to see 4 bodies in the grave, and upon closer inspection, realised that she, herself had died in the grave as a tombstone fell and hit her unconscious. Cee screams in horror before the credits roll.

In the post-credits, a man becomes angry when he watched the news about the tragedy and breaks his baseball bat. It is revealed that he is Cee's ex-boyfriend. She had dumped him for Aof; when the man leaves his home to call the police, Cee's ghost watches with a guilty look.

== Cast ==
- Ratchawin Wongviriya as Cee
- Atthama Chiwanitchapan as Bowie
- Thongpoom Siripipat as Aof
- Marion Affolter as Ying
- Pete Thongjua as Karn
- Ananda Everingham as Cee's ex-boyfriend
- Bordin Duke as Boyd the Director
- Monchaya Muangkrut as Ae
- Ariya Thanwong as Bee
- Pakkaporn Phatong as Young Bowie
- Panadda Sarapol as Young Cee
- Kulachart Rhuvatana as Racer
- Sarayuth Sritong as Worker
- Chatchai Nakornwong as Resort Staff
- Pongpisit Bottasri as Assistant Director
- Saowaros Prapaiwong as The body
- Worawat Na Gakasin as Van Driver
- Satirachat Cheijaroen as Little Girl
