= Death Whisperer 3 =

2025 Thai film by Narit Yuvaboon

- Theatrical release poster
- ธี่หยด 3
- Directed by: Narit Yuvaboon; Thanadet Pradit
- Written by: Sorarat Jirabovornwisut
- Based on: Characters by Krittanon
- Produced by: Narit Yuvaboon
- Starring: Nadech Kugimiya; Denise Jelilcha Kapuan; Natcha Nina Jessica Padovan; Kajbhandit Jaidee; Peerakrit Pacharabunyakiat; Ong-art Jeamjaroenpornkul; Pramet Noi-am; Arisara Wongchalee
- Cinematography: Nattaphon Liamwinit
- Edited by: Saravuth Nakajad
- Music by: Tinnakorn Thadsri; Terdsak Janpan
- Production companies: Major Joint Film; BEC World
- Distributed by: M Studio
- Release date: October 1, 2025
- Running time: 104 minutes
- Country: Thailand
- Languages: Thai; Japanese; English
- Box office: ฿137.9 million (Bangkok, Metropolitan & Chiang Mai) ฿465 million (nationwide)

Death Whisperer 3, also locally known as Tee Yod 3 (Thai: ธี่หยด 3), is a 2025 Thai supernatural horror film, produced by Major Joint Film and BEC Film, directed by Narit Yuvaboon, a producer making his directorial debut who replaced Taweewat Wantha, the director of the first two installments who withdrew. The film was also directed by Thanadet Pradit, the first installment's assistant director, making this project a co-directed effort. Starring by Nadech Kugimiya, Denise Jelilcha Kapuan, Natcha Nina Jessica Padovan, Kajbhandit Jaidee, Peerakrit Pacharabunyakiat, Ong-art Jeamjaroenpornkul, Pramet Noi-am, and Arisara Wongchalee, originally scheduled to be released on October 8, 2025. Before the release date was moved up to October 1, 2025. It is a sequel to Death Whisperer (2023) and Death Whisperer 2 (2024). In this installment, Chermawee Suwanphanuchoke also joins the cast. Originally, the senior actress Sida Puapimol signed on to the film, but Sida died suddenly on March 20, 2025, and was later replaced by Duangjai Hiransri.

Death Whisperer 3 stands apart from its two predecessors, as it is not adapted directly from Krittanon's novel. Instead, the film credits state that it is "based on characters created by Krittanon". This installment explores the origin of the Black Spirit and reveals the reason behind its deep-seated hatred toward humanity.

Furthermore, the dialogue subtly hints at Saming Khao Khwang, a spin-off film planned for the future. In addition, the mid-credits scene briefly reveals the eyes and lips of Nampetch, the daughter of the late Sarge Paphan, a character portrayed by Maylada Susri.

== Plot ==
In 1825, during the reign of King Bagyidaw, a Burmese woman fled across the river with her infant, pursued by British imperial troops. She was shot in the hand, causing her to drop her child into the water. Despite her efforts to save it, the child was swept away by the river’s current. Overcome with rage, she cursed the goddess worshipped by the locals and burned down the shrine. Consumed by vengeance, she transformed into a Black Spirit, only to be sealed inside a stone coffin by Sayador, a powerful monk.

Years later, in 1942, during the Pacific War, the Japanese army invaded Thailand and forced the local Karen into slavery to build the infamous Death Railway. When some captives escaped into a cave, the Japanese hunted them down mercilessly. To retaliate, the village elder Mawae performed a ritual to awaken the Black Spirit known as "Dà Yǒu". Yet instead of serving only as a weapon of vengeance, the spirit turned violent, preying upon young women in the village.

Decades passed, until 1976; three years after the events of the second installment. Yak, now grown into a calm and resolute young man, was determined to return to the army. Meanwhile, Yad, 7 months pregnant, rejoined her family.

But tragedy soon struck again: Yee, the youngest sister, vanished mysteriously after school. Guided by Sarge Paphan, the siblings conducted a spirit-calling ritual, invoking Yam's ghost to seek answers. The spirit revealed that Yee had been taken to "Bongsanodbiang", a haunted forest said to be far more dangerous than the infamous Dong Khomot.

On their perilous journey, they encountered two local villagers, Yakhin and Kongmu, who warned them that no charm or incantation from the outside world could protect them there. It was only the silver bells that could serve as signs of looming danger.

== Cast and characters ==
Cast	Character
Nadech Kugimiya	Yak
Denise Jelilcha Kapuan	Yad
Natcha Nina Jessica Padovan	Yee
Kajbhandit Jaidee	Yos
Peerakrit Pacharabunyakiat	Yod
Ong-art Jeamjaroenpornkul	Sergeant Paphan
Pramet Noi-am	Hang
Arisara Wongchalee	Boonyen
Chermawee Suwanphanuchoke	Yakhin
Jakarin Puribhat	Kongmu
Duangjai Hiransri	The Crone Mawae
Manita Chobchuen	Black Spirit
Thippapha Phasiriratanakul	Mie
Patsamon Suphannadetphong	Powa
Chaiyaphon Janmoontree	Janitor
Kantapon Surakamhang	Sayador
Maylada Susri	Nampetch (cameo)

== Original soundtrack ==
- "Khit tueng" (คิดถึง; "Missing you"), main theme by Bodyslam ft. Kan The Parkinson
- "Prod terd duang jai" (โปรดเถิดดวงใจ; "Please, Darling"), by Tool Thongjai
- "Mai luaen-hai" (ไม่เลือนหาย; "None shall be lost"), by The Darkest Romance ft. OHM Cocktail

== Production ==
=== Pre-production ===
In February 2025, M Studio, the film's producer and distributor, brought Death Whisperer 3 to the market at the 2025 Berlin Film Festival, with the film scheduled to begin filming in February.

At the European Film Market, the film Death Whisperer 3 received an overwhelming response even before filming began, with the rights to be sold to every ASEAN country on the first day.

Then on March 3, 2025, a ceremony to worship the film for good fortune was held at Channel 3 Studio, Nong Khaem. The filming is scheduled to begin on March 16, 2025. Later that evening, Nadech gave an interview to the press saying that in addition to Death Whisperer 3, which will be released this year, there will also be Saming Khao Khwang, a spin-off of Death Whisperer, which is the first chapter of the meeting of Yak and Sarge Paphan before meeting the Black Spirit in the first part, the production is scheduled to begin filming in January 2026, with a planned release date of September 30, 2026. Until the filming wrapped up on May 10, 2025.

=== Post-production ===
Later on May 14, 2025, at the Cannes Film Festival, Death Whisperer 3 revealed its first look images. And on June 24, 2025, Channel 3, Major Group and M Studio released the first teaser trailer for the story to watch.

The official teaser was released on August 13, 2025. Later, on August 25, the official poster was released, featuring the Y (Note: The Y family is a wordplay based on the Thai alphabet. All family members' names begin with the Thai letter ย (pronounced yo yak), which corresponds to the English letter Y. Hence, the group is referred to as the Y family.) family as in the first two installments, this time including Sarge Paphan, with flames forming a fiery frame around them.

The full trailer was released on September 3, 2025.

Nadech Kugimiya, the lead actor portraying Yak, also took part in the character design. He further suggested that his younger brothers, Yos and Yod, should accompany him and Sarge Paphan into Bongsanodbiang.

The origin of the Black Spirit comes from the comic version of Death Whisperer, from which the screenwriter adapted the storyline. The cursed forest known as "Bongsanodbiang" is derived from a ghost story told on an online radio program. In the narrative, it is said to be located in Sangkhla Buri district, Kanchanaburi province, and believed to be a gathering place of spirits according to the local Karen folklore.

== Promote ==
As part of its promotional campaign, Channel 3 aired first installment of the film on September 28, 2025, at 8:30 PM, marking its debut on free-to-air television. In addition, haunted house attractions inspired by the film were set up at Universal Studios Singapore, while at Seacon Bangkae in Bangkok the event was held exclusively from October 2 to October 19, 2025.

== Release ==
The film premiered at the 8th Bangkok International Film Festival on September 29, 2025, held at Iconsiam.

== Reception ==
=== Box office ===
On its first day of release, the film grossed ฿60 million nationwide (and grossed ฿19 million in Metropolitan Bangkok and Chiang Mai alone) marking the strongest opening for a Thai film in a year. Within just two days, its box office revenue surpassed ฿100 million, and by the fifth day, it had exceeded ฿200 million.

After eight days in theaters, the film's total box office revenue had surpassed ฿300 million.

It became one of only two Thai films in 2025 to cross the ฿100 million mark, alongside The Red Envelope, which was released earlier in the year.

=== Critical reception ===
Jean, a film analysis and critic from the YouTube channel Viewfinder, noted that most online reactions felt that Death Whisperer 3 did not quite measure up to its two predecessors. Personally, he rated the film 6 out of 10, remarking that "it isn't a great film, but neither is it unwatchably bad."

He compared the franchise to The Conjuring, which was thrilling and entertaining in its first two entries but gradually declined afterward. Still, he highlighted some strengths: Natcha Nina Jessica Padovan the young actress portraying Yee delivered an outstanding performance, while Nadech Kugimiya embodied his role convincingly across every emotional beat. The rest of the actors playing members of the Y family also performed with such authenticity that audiences could truly feel their familial bond. Another notable strength lies in the sound recording and mixing, with the surround sound design being highly immersive. For example, when Yee calls out "Yak", the voice resonates from all directions, making viewers instinctively turn their heads as if the sound were truly coming from around them.

MESO SKT from Daily News usually does not have high expectations for sequels, but she anticipated Death Whisperer 3 because the second film delivered both strong box office results and thrilling suspense. For viewers who missed the first two installments, it might be confusing why Yak is so fierce and skilled in handling spirits.

The new cast members performed well without being over the top or distracting, and their roles fit naturally within the story. Some lines of dialogue were predictable, and a few scenes felt unnecessary. She rated the script 6 out of 10.

She believes the ending sets up a possible sequel. Overall, she gave the film 7 out of 10, praising the cast for their strong performances.
