= Toon Tongjai =

Toon Tongjai ทูล ทองใจ
- Born: Noi Tongjai (Thai: น้อย ทองใจ); 1 March 1927; Amphawa District, Samut Songkhram Province, Thailand
- Died: February 1, 1995 (aged 67) Bangkok, Thailand
- Genres: Luk thung
- Occupation: Singer
- Instrument: Vocal
- Years active: 1930s–1995

Toon Tongjai (Thai: ทูล ทองใจ, pronounced [tʰūːn tʰɔ̄ːŋ.tɕāj]; 1 March 1927 – 1 February 1995), was a Thai luk thung singer and actor. His popular song include Please, Darling (โปรดเถิดดวงใจ), Wishes (ปรารถนา), The Remember Kiss (จูบมัดจำ), etc.

He was born in Amphawa District, Samut Songkhram Province. He finished education at third secondary.

He started on musical career by participating in various singing competitions and became the lead singer of the band "Luk Matuli" while serving in the Royal Thai Army.

Later, in 1956, he met with Benjamin Chokchana, who had written the song Please, Darling after returning from military service in the Korean War. Tongjai recorded the song, which brought him public acclaim. In 2023, Please, Darling was used in the soundtrack of the Thai supernatural-psychological horror movie, Death Whisperer.

He died at age 67 from a stroke.
