= My Ex =

- Theatrical poster for My Ex
- Directed by: Piyapan Choopetch
- Screenplay by: Adirek 'Uncle' Watleela; Piyapan Choopetch; Sommai Lertulan
- Story by: Adirek 'Uncle' Watleela
- Produced by: Adirek 'Uncle' Watleela; Jantima Liawsirikun
- Starring: Shahkrit Yamnarm; Wanida Termthanaporn; Nawadee Mokkhawesa; Atthama Chiwanitchaphan; Bordin Duke
- Edited by: Adirek 'Uncle' Watleela
- Music by: Thippataj Pirompak
- Production companies: Forfilms Co., Ltd.
- Distributed by: RS Film
- Release date: 27 August 2009
- Running time: 86 minutes
- Country: Thailand
- Language: Thai
- Box office: $1,492,418

My Ex (Thai: แฟนเก่า, romanized: Fan Kao) is a 2009 Thai horror film. Its sequel, My Ex 2: Haunted Lover, was released in 2010.

== Plot ==
Ken (Shahkrit Yamnarm from Bangkok Dangerous) is a young superstar and the dream date of every girl. While he can attract any woman he wants, every detail of his life ends up in gossip columns and tabloid magazines.

Two of his previous girlfriends — high-society girl Meen (Navadee Mokkhavesa) and innocent college student Bow (Atthama Chiwanitchaphan) — have already been exposed by the media. After dumping the pregnant Meen, he is now dating gorgeous young actress Ploy (Wanida Termthanaporn) and their every move makes the headline. Meanwhile, Bow is desperate to call Ken through a telephone booth but gets crushed by a truck, killing herself.

When news leak that Ken will marry Ploy, the media goes into a frenzy and the couple's dream life turns into a nightmare. It seems that someone is stalking them, day and night. Is it an ex-girlfriend, an obsessed fan or vengeful paparazzi? Ken's agent, Nimit (Bordin Duke), encourages him to take a break at his beachfront house but the problem only escalates as Ken starts to have visions of a woman and mysterious scratches begin to appear on his body. One by one, the people around Ken start to disappear... Ken begins to realize that an envious ghost of one of his ex-girlfriend never wants to let him go.

== Cast ==
- Shahkrit Yamnarm
- Wanida Termthanaporn
- Navadee Mokkhavesa
- Atthama Chiwanitchaphan
- Bordin Duke
