= The Djinn's Curse =

2023 Thai horror film

- Theatrical release poster
- Directed by: Kriangkrai Monwichit
- Written by: Kanjana Sriman; Kriangkrai Monwichit
- Starring: Akara Amarttayakul; Anyarin Terathananpat; Peeyarat Jatupo; Marika Paekiatchalorn; Amena Pinit
- Production companies: M39; Monwichit Entertainment
- Release date: 28 September 2023 (Thailand)
- Running time: 98 minutes
- Country: Thailand
- Language: Thai

The Djinn's Curse (Thai: ของแขก, RTGS: Khong Khaek) is a 2023 Thai supernatural horror film written and directed by Kriangkrai Monwichit. It stars Akara Amarttayakul, Anyarin Terathananpat, Peeyarat Jatupo, and Marika Paekiatchalorn. The film follows a family that moves to Narathiwat Province due to financial difficulties and becomes entangled with a vengeful djinn. Produced by M39 together with Monwichit Entertainment, it was released in Thai theaters on 28 September 2023.

== Plot ==
In 1373 AH (1953/1954 CE), two men capture a woman named Nee to exorcise a djinn she inherited from her grandmother. During the ritual, the djinn possesses Nee, vows to find a new host, and blinds her left eye. Decades later, Win moves to a house in Narathiwat Province with his wife, Joy, and their two daughters, Meena and Lin. One night, an unseen force tries to unlock the basement door, causing the doorknob to break off when Meena investigates.

The next day, a woman named Nasreen brings Lee to repair the door, and afterward, she asks a practitioner named Alang to curse Win's family. Soon after, the family experiences strange occurrences, including sightings of the djinn, Joy falling ill, and animal remains appearing around their home. One night, while Joy and Meena are driving, they spot the djinn and collide with a truck, killing Meena and leaving Joy hospitalized.

Suspecting Nasreen of cursing his family, Win confronts his ex-wife, and she admits to hiring Alang. That same night, Nee performs a ritual to transfer the djinn to Lin, possessing her. A possessed Lin runs into the forest, pursued by Win, Lee, Lung Wae, and Dul. Lung Wae attempts an exorcism, but the djinn kills him and retreats to the house's basement.

Win rushes back to the house, where he is joined by Joy, who has left the hospital. In the basement, Win and Joy hold Lin's hands to help her resist the djinn as it forces a sharp object toward her face, while Dul recites prayers to banish it. Before departing, the djinn injures Lin's left eye, mirroring Nee's wound. Later, Alang reveals to Lee that he never actually used black magic against Win's family, having only pretended to cast a spell for Nasreen. In reality, the djinn was Nee's family legacy, long sealed inside the basement, and was unleashed by Chat, a coworker who resented Win for taking his job.

== Cast ==
- Akara Amarttayakul as Win
- Anyarin Terathananpat as Joy
- Peeyarat Jatupo as Lin
- Marika Paekiatchalorn as Meena
- Amena Pinit as Nasreen
- Thiti Rhumorn as Lung Wae
- Hakim Donlapavijit as Chat
- Sonthaya Chitmanee as Alang
- Amadkuciasree Doloh as Lee
- Adull Borsu as Dul
- Muhammad Monwichit as Tok Bomoh
- Phurada Kongpech as Nee

== Production ==
Director Kriangkrai Monwichit co-wrote the screenplay with Kanjana Sriman, developing the project out of his passion for the horror genre and a desire to explore underrepresented folklore. He aimed to offer audiences a fresh perspective on Islamic mysticism and the concept of the djinn. In Islamic theology, djinn are supernatural beings created from smokeless fire that inhabit a parallel dimension, while the practice of black magic is strictly forbidden and associated with malevolent spirits. These beliefs are deeply rooted in Southern Thailand.

As a Muslim, Monwichit noted that his familiarity with Islamic culture and the lack of mainstream horror films centered on Muslim beliefs inspired him to fill that niche. Because the subject of black magic is sensitive within the Muslim community, the film faced criticism prior to its release. Monwichit stated that he worked to balance horror entertainment with religious accuracy so viewers could distinguish local superstitions from Islamic teachings. On 10 May 2022, the production held a traditional dua (prayer) ceremony and press conference at the Al Meroz Hotel in Bangkok to officially launch the film.

== Release ==
The Djinn's Curse was released in Thailand on 28 September 2023. By late October 2023, the film had grossed 50 million baht nationwide. The film was also acquired for distribution in several other countries, performing particularly well at the box office in Malaysia.

== Sequel ==
A sequel, titled The Djinn's Curse 2 (Thai: ของแขก 2), was released in Thailand on 25 June 2026.
