= Necromancer (2005 film) =

- The Thai theatrical poster.
- Directed by: Piyapan Choopetch
- Written by: Piyapan Choopetch; Kittikorn Liasirikun
- Produced by: Jantima Liawsirikun; Rashane Limtrakul
- Starring: Chatchai Plengpanich; Akara Amarttayakul
- Cinematography: Nattawut Kittikhun
- Edited by: Piyapan Choopetch
- Music by: Giant Wave; Natee Kongsri; Channasa Mattaphan; Sittichai Srichaiyantra; Mongkol Pongwachirin
- Distributed by: RS Film
- Release date: 10 March 2005
- Running time: 118 minutes
- Country: Thailand
- Language: Thai

Necromancer (Thai: จอมขมังเวทย์, translit. Jom kha mung wej) is a 2005 Thai action thriller film directed by Piyapan Choopetch and starring Chatchai Plengpanich and Akara Amarttayakul. It is very loosely based on the 1996 killing of some drug dealers by police, but with an added dimension of witchcraft battles between police and ex-police.

== Plot ==
Itti (Chatchai Plengpanich) is a former police officer, now convicted criminal, and endowed with powerful black magic abilities that make him a feared prisoner. He is moved to solitary confinement in a specially constructed cell, but with his mind-reading abilities, is able to detect a weakness in the one jailor who brings him food. In his interactions with the jailor, he is able to take over the man's mind and use the man to help him escape.

A young police officer, Santi (Akara Amarttayakul) is assigned to track Itti down, and in confronting Itti, Santi becomes increasingly obsessed with gaining magical powers himself.

== Release and reception ==
Produced by RS Film, Necromancer was released in Thai cinemas on March 10, 2005.

Chatchai Plengpanich won the best actor award for his role at the Thailand National Film Awards.

The film has been released on Region 3 DVD, with English subtitles, and was marketed in English-speaking territories with the tagline: "Someone's out to hex you."
