= The Parkinson (Thai band) =

Thai pop, soul band

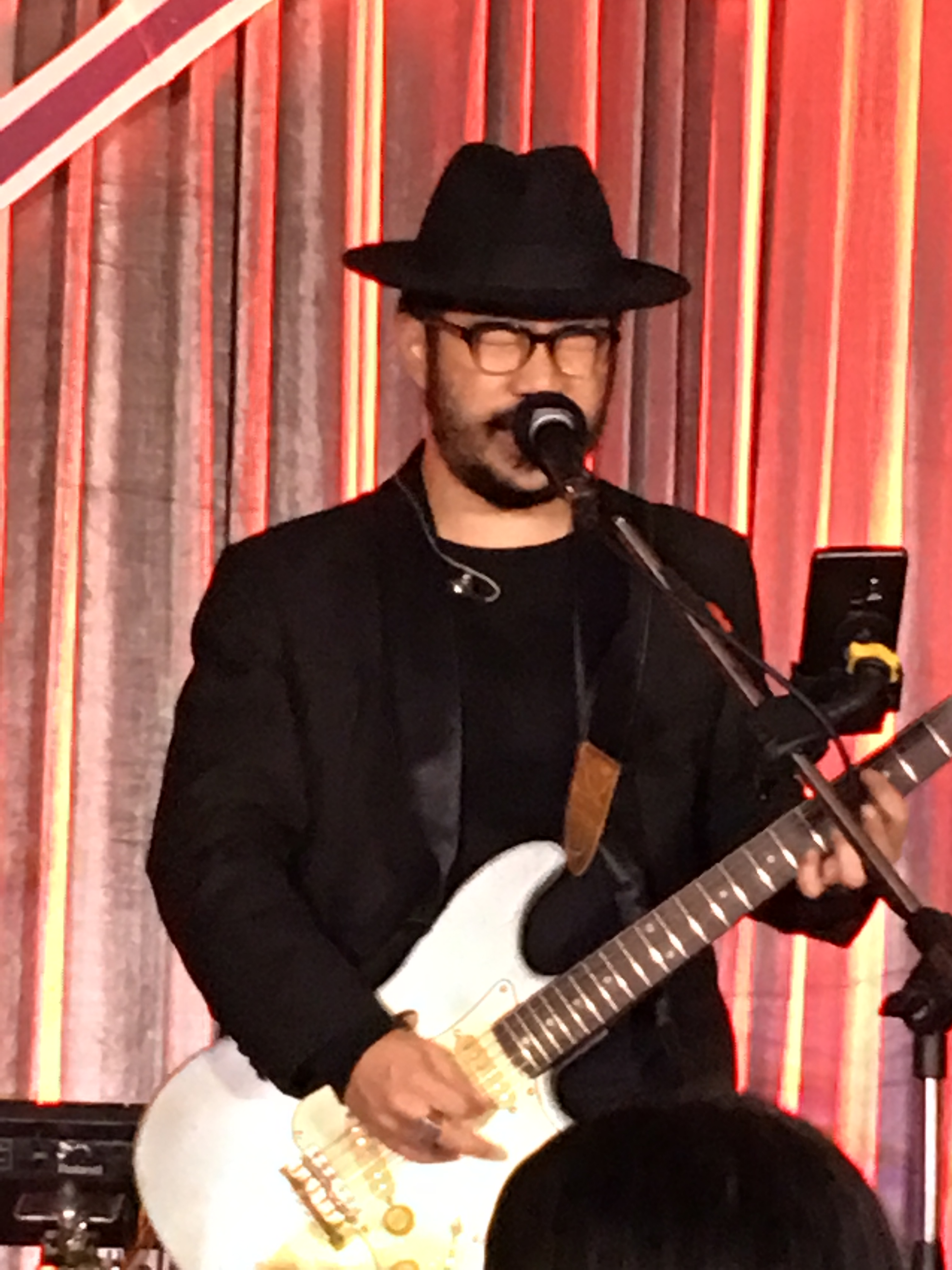
- Kan – lead vocals

Background information
- Origin: Bangkok, Thailand
- Genres: Thai pop, soul, Blues
- Years active: (2015–present)
- Label: SPICY DISC
- Members: Niphat Kamjornpreecha (Kan) (lead vocals); Natthawit Odaki (Toe); Arithat Kueajitkulanun (Beer)
- Website: spicydisc.com/artist/13

The Parkinson (Thai: เดอะพาร์กินสัน) is a Thai pop, soul band formed in 2015 in Bangkok, Thailand under the label SPICY DISC.

The band is well known in Thailand for many Thai songs, such as "Tell Her That I love" ("จะบอกเธอว่ารัก")"Dear Friend" ("เพื่อนรัก"). Their music is very influenced by American blues.

== Members ==
- Niphat Kamjornpreecha (Kan) – นิภัทร์ กำจรปรีชา (กานต์) : (Guitar, lead vocals)
- Natthawit Odaki (Toe) – ณัฐวิทย์ โอดาคิ (โต) :(Bassist, backing vocals)
- Arithat Kueajitkulanun (Beer) – อริย์ธัช เกื้อจิตกุลนันท์ (เบียร์) : (drums, backing vocals)

== Discography ==
=== Album ===
Name	Detail	Track listing
แรก (First)	Release date: june 2019; Format: CD, streaming; Label: SPICY DISC	Track listing: 1. แค่นี้...พอ (Present); 2. เพื่อนรัก (Dear Friend); 3. จะบอกเธอว่ารัก (Tell Her That I love); 4. ยินดี (Delight) with "Lukwa Pijika Chittaputta"; 5. คืนนี้ (Not Yet); 6. เป็นประจำ (Shark Week) feat. UNKLE T. & Pae Sax Mild); 7. คนชั่ว 2018 (New Item); 8. ที่เดิมในหัวใจ – The Parkinson (Cover:TMT Feat.ตู่ ภพธร); 9. ไปเถอะ (Just Go.); 10. หมดแก้ว (Delete); 11. กลัว (Testo) – The Parkinson feat. น้ำฝน ภักดี; 12. ไม่จำ (Déjà Vu!)

=== Single ===
- ธี่เดินทางกลับมา, Tee doen-thang klap ma (Ost. Tee Yod; 2023)
