= Art of the Devil 2 =

2005 Thai film by Kongkiat Khomsiri

- Theatrical release poster
- Directed by: Pasith Buranajan; Kongkiat Khomsiri; Isara Nadee; Seree Phongnithi; Yosapong Polsap; Putipong Saisikaew; Art Thamthrakul
- Written by: Kongkiat Khomsiri; Yosapong Polsap; Art Thamtrakul
- Produced by: Charoen Iamphungporn
- Starring: Napakpapha Nakprasitte; Hataiwan Ngamsukonpusit; Akarin Siwapornpitak; Chanida Suriyakompon; Namo Tongkumnerd; Pavarit Wongpanitch
- Cinematography: Tanon Wattanapaibool
- Edited by: Sunij Asavinikul
- Music by: Wutichai Praiwan
- Distributed by: Five Star Production
- Release date: 1 December 2005
- Running time: 100 minutes
- Country: Thailand
- Language: Thai

Art of the Devil 2 also known as Long Khong (Thai: ลองของ) is a 2005 Thai supernatural horror film directed by Kongkiat Khomsiri, Art Thamthrakul, Yosapong Polsap, Putipong Saisikaew, Isara Nadee, Pasith Buranajan and Seree Pongniti (known collectively as the "Ronin Team"). It was released by Five Star Production.

A sequel in name only to a 2004 film Art of the Devil, this film is about a teacher, named Aajaan Panor (portrayed by Napakpapha Nakprasitte), who is humiliated by some students. She turns to black magic to exact revenge.

== Plot ==
Two years ago, six school friends – Ta, Kim, Por, Tair, Noot, and Ko – were faced with a grudge. Ta's mother died when he was young, and his father remarried Ta's teacher, Miss Aajaan Panor. Kim was his former girlfriend (but is now dating Por, who is a nerd). The tomboyish Tair and stylish singer Noot might be lovers (though this is never made clear), and Ko is their fun-loving friend.

During their last year at high school, Miss Panor seduces Por (though this is not known to his friends). Por subsequently discovers he's not the only one in her bed. In addition to being married to Ta's father, Miss Panor is also having an affair with the sports coach. Fuelled by jealousy, Por suggests filming Panor and the coach to 'prove her infidelity' to Ta's father. The friends, save for Kim, do so, and broadcast it to the entire school. The coach soon discovers it was them and holds the group at gunpoint while he sexually abuses them, with Noot being the most frequent student he sexually advances on.

Seeking revenge, the students approach a shaman who agrees to curse the coach. The shaman also warns the group that once black magic is used, it will haunt them forever. A few days later, Por goes back to the shaman and asks him to curse Miss Panor, too. The coach dies in which numerous fish hooks appear from his body while his family’s healer attempted to heal the wounds he received during his catfish fishing trip. Miss Panor, who is embarrassed at her sexual exploits being revealed, is found stabbing herself repeatedly in the legs. She subsequently becomes a recluse, returning home to her cottage on the river, away from the city.

In the present, the six friends gather together after Ta's father committed suicide in order to head to the remote village to visit the mausoleum of his father’s ashes and pay their respects to Miss Panor. Upon arrival at Panor's cottage on the river, Noot's cell phone rings; her uncle wants her to return because her father is in the hospital, so she makes her goodbyes and heads back to the city. Miss Panor is a polite hostess (if a little distant), and Ta's grandmother seems harmless enough, though he warns everyone that she is a bit senile. As the group stays at the cottage, Kim experiences some strange occurrences around it such as, the door moving on its own, a white figure appearing underwater, and witnessing Ta's grandmother devouring a cat.

Miss Panor retires to a secret hut in the jungle, where she has several corpses gathered round, all of them sitting at desks, like students. Each corpse has a photo attached to it, indicating which former student it represents.

At dinner that night, as the friends eat the soup Panor has made for them, each student spits out something suspicious: Ko spits up a fingernail with Doraemon painted on it, Por spits up a piece of tongue with a piercing on it, Kim spits up an eye contact lens and Tair an eyeball. The group realizes that the meat, which is actually dismembered body parts added in the soup, is in fact, Noot. It is implied that after Noot left the cottage, she was captured, tortured, killed, and dismembered by Miss Panor. They search the cottage for Miss Panor. Kim finds a video camera with a tape that shows Miss Panor killing and cannibalizing the shaman who cursed her, and then rushing towards the camera with a tree branch raised and bringing it down on whoever is holding the camera.

Tair begins to have hallucinations of rotting corpses shambling around everywhere. The group flees the house and sees a light outside. They call to a nearby boat for help, but it drives past them. The driver takes a fatal fall from the boat after seeing Miss Panor coming towards him from the other side, which sinks. Kim tumbles into the water and has a vision of Panor and Ta's father. In the vision, Panor is shown torturing Ta's father by ripping off his toenails, on the premise that if she hobbles him, he can't leave her. When Panor leaves the room, Ta's father shoots himself in the head to end his suffering. Kim relates this to the others, and they find the gun. In the same room, there are also some jars filled with pickled mangoes. In one of these jars, the group finds Ta's dead father.

The group runs to the house's dusty old shrine to hide and pray. Tair has a laughing fit and is temporarily possessed by Miss Panor. Ko threatens Tair with the gun, but suddenly starts to writhe and flail as dozens of geckos claw their way out of his body, killing him.

The youths now decide to split up: Por and Ta go off into the jungle to find Panor, leaving Kim and Tair sitting outside the shrine, with Tair (now free of possession) still seeing visions of corpses. She panics and runs off, and Kim follows into the dense jungle. The boys hear Kim fall down. They run to find her, but are separated. Ta finds Kim and wrenches a piece of metal from her leg. Alone, Por has creepy visions of Panor. Ta leaves Kim to look for Por. Tair bursts from the jungle, cowering away from her visions. After seeing Kim as a walking corpse and in hysterics, Tair gouges and rips out her own eyes, ultimately killing herself.

Por finds Kim, who appears to him as Miss Panor, taunting him about their love affair. Firing the gun at Kim, but Ta rescues her just in time. Por runs off into the jungle and discovers Panor chanting in her secret hut. Por flees, but a vision of Panor appears before him, hamstrings him, and starts pulling out his teeth; Por crawls away and confesses that he had a love spell placed on Panor causing her to seduce him, became jealous when he found out she was also sleeping with the coach and took part in filming them and then placing a pain-inducing curse on Panor as punishment. Suddenly, his vision clears and he sees Kim and Ta. Kim is repulsed by Por's confession; she and Ta leave Por in the jungle.

Miss Panor arrives, ties up Por, and takes him to her secret hut. She stabs him in the neck with a syringe full of a paralytic agent, then pours boiling water down his throat and slowly burns every inch of his skin with a blowtorch.

In the jungle, Ta is carrying Kim on his back. She begs him to continue without her, but he refuses. The two of them come across a small shrine, on which is hanging Noot's bag. Her cell phone rings: it's her uncle, wondering where she is.

In the secret jungle hut, Miss Panor is performing CPR on fatally burned Por in order to inflict more torture on him. Meanwhile, police officers converge outside the hut. As Miss Panor starts to use a power drill on Por's head, the officers break in and shoot her.

Kim is rushed to a hospital. She recovers, and Ta comes to visit her. As they chat, the TV in Kim's room broadcasts a news show, which reports that the five students who visited Miss Panor are dead. Also discovered in the secret hut was Ta's charred corpse.

In horror, Kim turns to see that Ta is actually a badly burned, walking corpse. He never went with them to visit Miss Panor; he was already dead by then. As he pets Kim's hand, Ta explains: the video of Panor eating the shaman was taken by Ta's father, who had threatened divorce after witnessing the tape of her and the coach. For this, Panor tortured him and he killed himself. Panor locked Ta's grandmother in a closet and left her to starve to death. It was Ta's grandmother who had told Panor that in order to break the spells placed on her she had to kill the shaman that was paid to perform them and eat his flesh. She also warned Panor that it could drive her insane (it does). It also becomes clear that the coach had also placed a love spell on Panor to instigate their affair just like Por did. Miss Panor was the victim of all these spells. Her attempt to free herself and seek revenge led her into insanity. She tortured Ta in all the ways that will be experienced by his friends. Ta's vengeful spirit had lured the group there so they could feel the pain that he went through. He only saved Kim from being killed because he still loves her.

A flashback of their days in school returned. Kim and a classmate had a crush on Ta. Kim makes a bet with her classmate that if Ta doesn't court Kim within a week, she will "offer" Ta to her. Kim was then seen with the shaman who appeared earlier, who warns her, "Once you start, it will follow you till you die." She receives a clay doll and thanks the shaman.

The film ends with Kim jumps out of the hospital window to her death, holding the clay doll the shaman gave her. Ta's burnt form lies beside her declaring his love for her.

== Nominations ==
Napakpapha (better known in Thailand as Mamee) was a nominee for best actress for the Bangkok Critics Assembly's 2005 awards. She was also nominated as best supporting actress for the Thailand National Film Awards. This nomination was protested by Mamee and Five Star Production, who asserted that Mamee should have been nominated in the best actress category. Five Star then boycotted the awards ceremony.

== Film festivals ==
- 2006 Bangkok International Film Festival
- 2006 New York Asian Film Festival
- 2006 Fantasia Festival
