= Death Whisperer 2 =

2024 Thai film by Taweewat Wanta

- Theatrical release poster
- ธี่หยด 2
- Directed by: Taweewat Wantha
- Screenplay by: Sorarat Jirabovornwisut; Palapon Pongpat
- Based on: Tee Yod...The End of Madness by Krittanon
- Produced by: Narit Yuvaboon
- Starring: Nadech Kugimiya; Denise Jelilcha Kappun; Kajbundit Jaidee; Peerakrit Phacharabunyakiat; Rattanawadee Wongthong; Natthacha Nina Jessica Padovan; Arisara Wongchalee; Pramet Noi-am
- Cinematography: Sarun Srisingchai
- Edited by: Saravut Nakajud
- Music by: Tinnakorn Thadsri; Terdsak Janpan
- Production companies: Major Joint Film; BEC World
- Distributed by: M Studio
- Release date: October 10, 2024
- Running time: 112 minutes
- Country: Thailand
- Language: Thai
- Box office: ฿286.08 million (Bangkok, Metropolitan & Chiang Mai) ฿815 million (nationwide)

Death Whisperer 2, also known as Tee Yod 2 (Thai: ธี่หยด 2), is a 2024 Thai supernatural horror film directed by Taweewat Wantha, starring by Nadech Kugimiya, Denise Jelilcha Kappun, Kajbundit Jaidee, Peerakrit Phacharabunyakiat, Rattanawadee Wongthong, Natcha Nina Jessica Padowan, Arisara Wongchalee, and Pramet Noi-am. It is a sequel to Death Whisperer (2023). Like the first installment, the film was shot entirely for IMAX release. It is based on a true story that occurred in 1972 in Dan Makham Tia District, Kanchanaburi Province, and was embellished for entertainment purposes in the style of the Evil Dead series by Sam Raimi, which served as an inspiration for the first installment.

== Plot ==
In 1854, Puang, a soldier wounded in battle, encounters the ghost of a woman dressed in black who offers to keep him alive in exchange for serving as her host. After Puang agrees, she removes her tongue and shoves it into his mouth. The ghost, known as Puang's ghoul, has since controlled Puang and claimed many victims over the years.

In 1975, three years after Puang's ghoul caused Yam's death in the first film, Yak has given up everything to be a hunter of evil supernatural beings, relentlessly seeking vengeance on the ghoul to avenge his sister. He is accompanied by his friend Sarge, who has survived after being shot in the first film.

Their hunt for the ghoul leads them to Dong Khomot, a forest where many supernatural beings live. They are joined by five others: Luechai, a man who has also lost family members to the ghoul; Luechai's nephews Jirasak and Nawin; Sem, a necromancer from Laplae; and Khom, a porter from Northern Thailand. In the forest, the group encounters various malevolent supernatural beings. Sem is killed by a king cobra blocking their path. Jirasak panics upon seeing Sem's ghost and opens fire at the rest, killing Khom before eventually shooting off his own head. Nawin is separated from the group and devoured by a werecat, which transforms itself into Nawin in an attempt to lure the rest to their doom.

Only Yak, Sarge, and Luechai are left as they manage to get into a salt lick, which is considered sacred ground. The next morning, they reach a dilapidated hut near a swamp and encounter Puang, who is still alive after over 100 years as the ghoul has made him immortal in exchange for serving as her host. After incapacitating Sarge, Puang says that he had attempted to destroy the ghoul but the ritual had been interrupted by Luechai's ancestors when they burnt down his hut. Over the years, Puang has managed to hide from the ghoul because of an amulet he wears on his arm. After Luechai cuts off Puang's arm, the ghoul appears, kills Luechai and Puang, and takes back her tongue. Yak tries to fight the ghoul but she makes him shoot himself in the chest, apparently killing him.

Meanwhile, Yak's family has moved to a hotel to prepare for the wedding of Yad and her fiancé Pradit. The ghoul appears at the hotel and causes everyone to feel drowsy with the eerie whispering. Pradit falls under the ghoul's control and attacks Yak's father and brothers, but they manage to knock him out with a Buddha figurine. In the meantime, the ghoul takes over Boonyen's mind and makes her hunt down Yee with a pickaxe. Yee manages to evade her possessed mother and Chauy's ghost, which is also under the ghoul's control. Yad, who is separated from her mother and sister, experiences a vision of Yam before she is attacked by the ghoul.

Yak and Sarge suddenly show up and fight the ghoul. Due to a protective yantra Puang had drawn on a voodoo doll of him, Yak had survived the gunshot wound. Now wearing Puang's amulet, he is invisible to the ghoul when he fights her. The ghoul grabs Yad and threatens to throw her out of a window, unless Yak removes the amulet and reveals himself. Yak then takes off the amulet, manages to save Yad, and narrowly stops the ghoul from trying to make Sarge shoot himself. The ghoul overpowers him and sticks out her tongue to make him eat it and come under her control. Just then, Yad, wearing Puang's amulet, pulls out the ghoul's tongue, allowing Yak to cut it off and Sarge to destroy it. Weakened without her tongue, the ghoul is cornered and eventually vanquished by Yak, who pounds her forehead with a takrut and frees all the ghosts of the victims under her control.

The family is reunited and Yak sees Yam's ghost smiling at him.

== Cast ==
- Nadech Kugimiya as Yak
- Denise Jelilcha Kappun as Yad
- Kajbundit Jaidee as Yos
- Peerakrit Phacharabunyakiat as Yod
- Natcha Nina Jessica Padowan as Yee
- Arisara Wongchalee as Boonyen
- Pramet Noi-am as Hang
- Rattanawadee Wongthong as Yam
- Ongart Cheamcharoenpornkul as Sarge Paphan
- Manita Chobchuen as Woman in black
- Jampa Saenprom as Chauy
- Phiravich Attachitsataporn as Pradit
- Yasaka Chaisorn as Puang
  - Pantakan Pumthong as Puang (younger)
- Todsapol Maisuk as Jirasak
- Sahatchai Chumrum as Luechai
- Thanatsaran Samthonglai as Nawin
- Somjai Janmoontree as Sem
- Thanachet Namwong as Khom
- Chakkrit Wangpattanasirikul as Pradit's Father
- Phimphisut Rattanachotisakul as Pradit's Mother
- Sanpetch Dechnok as Cherd
- Natthakarn Kamnuengtham as Payom
- Sippakorn Phongphanit as Hotel Staff
- Kui Bangkapi as Helicopter Pilot

== Original soundtrack ==
- "Mai luaen-hai" (ไม่เลือนหาย; "None shall be lost"), main theme by The Darkest Romance ft. OHM Cocktail
- "Tee doen-thang klap ma" (ธี่เดินทางกลับมา; "Returning"), ending theme by The Parkinson

== Production and release ==
Although the ending of Death Whisperer seemed to hint that there would be a sequel, the production crew had not started on it until the first installment was a success in 2023, and the novel Tee Yod...The End of Madness was published shortly after Death Whisperer was released. The film is loosely based on that novel, the sequel to Tee Yod...The Beginning of Madness by the same author, Krittanon. The plot comes from an idea by the director Taweewat Wantha.

On February 15, 2024, the creators, directors, crew, and actors, came together for a prayer ceremony before the filming began at Channel 3 Studio, Nong Khaem.

On February 28, 2024, Channel 3 and M Studio held a press conference on the releases of two films: Death Whisperer 2, which was released on October 10, 2024; and Manaman starring Naphat Siangsomboon, which was released in August.

A 35-second teaser trailer was released on YouTube on July 3, 2024, and the films was expected to be quite different from the novel. Another teaser was released on August 8, 2024.

The official trailer was released on September 12, 2024.

A gala premiere was held on October 8, 2024, two days before the first screening at Suralai Hall, Iconsiam.

After seven days of running in theaters, the film has grossed ฿450 million in Thailand On the first day of its release, the film earned ฿80 million in Thailand, making it the highest-grossing Thai film in history on its first day of release. After nine days, it has already generated over ฿550 million in nationwide revenue. and grossed ฿172.89 million in combined receipts in Metropolitan Bangkok and Chiang Mai alone, becoming the highest-grossing domestic film of the year and fourth-highest grossing domestic film of all time. The earliest screening starts at 8:00 AM, while the latest one is at 3:00 AM, at IMAX Laser, Major Cineplex Ratchayothin.

In Vietnam, Death Whisperer 2 was released on October 18, 2024, setting a record for the highest advance booking with a total of over 30,000 tickets sold, and also grossed ฿13 million on its first day, the highest record among all Thai films released there.

The film is inspired by Sam Raimi's Evil Dead franchise, just like the first installment. However, Death Whisperer 2 is quite different from Death Whisperer as it has so many action scenes that it is more of an action horror film. This idea came from lead actor Nadech Kugimiya when he was discussing the script with the production team. It was the director and producer's intention to have scenes that would keep the audience on the edge of their seats. The hotel scene where a possessed Boonyen chases Yee with a pickaxe was inspired by the 1980 film The Shining. In addition, Taweewat Wantha, added a small playful touch by appearing briefly in a scene as a chopper pilot, credited Kui Bangkapi.

Post-screening, one of the most discussed characters was Sem, the necromancer of Laplae who ended up being the first to die in the forest. Sem is portrayed by Somjai Janmoontree, a student of martial arts actor Panna Rittikrai and a stuntman who has starred in many films and television dramas. Khom, the porter from Northern Thailand, is portrayed by Hernfa Lannathai, a Northern Thai folk singer and comedian. The scene where Yak and Sarge talk to Luechai in a traditional coffee shop was filmed in Uttaradit province.

A real king cobra was used in the Dong Khomot scene, which was filmed in an actual forest. The crew had to use the day for night technique because of limited daylight hours. The scene where Puang emerges from the swamp was filmed at Rayong Botanical Garden, Klaeng district, Rayong province. The scene where a possessed Yee pulls out her tooth is real because the actress Natcha Nina Jessica Padowan's baby tooth was about to fall out at the time when it was filmed.

In November 2024, the price of a ticket for watching the film was reduced to ฿69.

In the Philippines, the film was released by Viva Communications on January 22, 2025.

To promote its sequel, which will be released on October 1, 2025, the film was screened as a special program on September 25, with ticket prices starting at ฿39, available only at participating Major Cineplex branches.

== Sequel ==
Narit Yuwaboon, the producer of both parts of the film Death Whisperer, revealed that he has started planning to make a film Death Whisperer 3 and is currently writing the script but cannot reveal the details. Nadech Kugimiya will still return to play the role of Yak, with a release date set for October 8, 2025. Later in January 2025, Taweewat, the director of both Death Whisperer films, announced his withdrawal from directing Death Whisperer 3, citing that he had run out of ideas and that he had opened his own company and accepted directing film work off other studio.

As of February 2025, it is only known roughly that the director is Narit Yuwaboon, the producer of the previous two installments. All the recurring characters will have their roles again. Along with a new character portrayed by Chermawee Suwanpanuchoke from the television series Doctor Climax. The plot is as follows: Yak sets out on a rescue mission when his youngest sister, Yee, is kidnapped by a mystic cult that leads him to a cursed village.
