= Death Whisperer =

2023 Thai film by Taweewat Wantha

- Theatrical release poster
- ธี่หยด
- Directed by: Taweewat Wantha
- Written by: Sorarat Jirabovornwisut; Thammanan Chulaborirak
- Based on: Tee Yod...The Beginning of Madness by Krittanon
- Produced by: Narit Yuvaboon
- Starring: Nadech Kugimiya; Rattanawadee Wongthong; Denise Jelilcha Kapaun; Peerakit Patcharabunyakiat; Kajbundit Jaidee; Nutthatcha Padovan; Arisara Wongchalee
- Cinematography: Nattaya Chaopa
- Edited by: Mas Chitrachinda
- Music by: Agung Bagus; Terdsak Janpan; Banana Sound Studio
- Production companies: Major Join Film; BEC World
- Distributed by: M Studio
- Release date: 26 October 2023
- Running time: 121 minutes
- Country: Thailand
- Language: Thai
- Budget: ฿20 million
- Box office: ฿198.7 million (Bangkok, Metropolitan & Chiang Mai) ฿502 million (nationwide)

Death Whisperer (also known locally as Tee Yod; Thai: ธี่หยด) is a 2023 Thai supernatural horror film directed by Taweewat Wantha, starring Nadech Kugimiya, Rattanawadee Wongthong, Denise Jelilcha Kapaun, Karj-bundit Jaidee, Peerakit Patcharabunyakiat, Arisara Wongchalee and Paramet Noi-um. Produced by Major Join Film and BEC World, a joint venture of BEC World (Channel 3) and M Studio. This film is the first Thai film to be shot entirely for IMAX screening. It is based on a story set in 1972 about a young girl in a remote village in Dan Makham Tia District, Kanchanaburi Province.

== Plot ==
The movie is set in 1972 in a remote farming village in Dan Makham Tia district Kanchanaburi province in western Thailand, centering on a family of eight — the parents, their three sons Yak, Yos, and Yod, and their three daughters Yad, Yam, and Yee. Nart, a girl from their village, dies in a horrific manner after being ill for a long time.

One day on their way home after school, the three girls see the ghost of a woman dressed in black appearing under a tree. Yam soon falls sick after seeing a strange old woman during a family outing to an amusement park. Around this time, Yak returns from military service after sensing that something is amiss at home. Yam's condition worsens and she starts behaving strangely sometimes as if she were a different person. One night, the other children see Yam go into a trance and leave the house. When they try to follow her, they hear an eerie whispering which causes them to feel drowsy. Yak puts his hand on a flame and Yad bites herself to force themselves to remain conscious while they wake the others and manage to bring Yam back. One day, Chauy, the strange old woman Yam saw earlier, breaks into their house and attacks Yam, managing to remove one of Yam's teeth before their mother chases her away.

Yak learns from his friend Sarge that Yam is under the control of an evil spirit (the ghost dressed in black). They go to Chauy's hut and see her performing a ritual to make Yam the new host for the evil spirit before she kills herself. Left with no choice, the family calls a priest, Puth, for help, and he instructs them to cut down a bamboo tree near their house. They find human internal organs in the tree — including a heart that is still beating — and destroy everything by fire. Yak, Yod, Yad, and their mother bring Yam to the nearest hospital in their truck, with Sarge and Puth accompanying them. Their father, Yos, and Yee remain at home.

During their journey to the hospital, they are attacked by supernatural forces, causing them to experience hallucinations. Yak loses control of the wheel when the possessed Yam starts whispering again, making him drowsy and causing their truck to crash, killing Puth. After Yak regains consciousness, he confronts the possessed Yam, who uses his handgun to shoot Sarge and threatens to kill their other unconscious family members. Yad awakes and stabs Yam in the arm with a knife, causing the evil spirit to temporarily leave her body. Yak then seizes back his handgun and apparently kills the evil spirit by shooting her.

In the hospital, Yam seems to be recovering well until she suddenly says bye to Yad and starts pulling out her tooth. The rest of the family rush in and try to stop her but it is too late as Yam's body becomes swollen and blood spurts out of all her body orifices. Yad sees the evil spirit outside the window for a moment. After Yam's funeral, Yak goes to the tree where the girls first saw the evil spirit and burns it down, saying that it is not over yet.

== Cast ==
- Nadech Kugimiya as Yak
- Rattanawadee Wongthong as Yam
- Denise Jelilcha Kapaun as Yad
- Kajbundit Jaidee as Yos
- Peerakit Patcharabunyakiat as Yod
- Nutthatcha Padovan as Yee
- Arisara Wongchalee as Boonyen
- Paramet Noi-um as Hang
- Ongart Cheamcharoenpornkul as Sarge Paphan
- Porjade Kaenpetch as Mr. Puth
- Manita Chobchuen as Black Spirit
- Jampa Saenprom as Chauy
- Michelle Samiha Lamloet Haque as Nart
- Peerapol Kijreunpiromsuk as Ming
- Natda Chawawanid as Nee
- Sorabodee Changsiri as Mun
- Panida Sararat as Girl Student
- Autthawikorn Tookaew as Boy Student
- Phitchayapha Salaesakul as Roadside Ghost 1
- Kunyapak Noppawong Na Ayutthaya as Roadside Ghost 2
- Neennara Khananuraksakul as Floating Ghost 1
- Aitsaranuchat Homhuan as Floating Ghost 2
- Jiranya Pakhiao as Floating Ghost 3
- Sasipa Sedboobpa as Floating Ghost 4
- Suriwipa Yimlamai as Floating Ghost 5
- Thunyaluk Rajta as Floating Ghost 6 and Chuay Stand-In
- Warintorn Poopadrae as Black Spirit Stand-In 1
- Jirarat Pupattananurak as Black Spirit Stand-In 2
- Thippapha Saensenya as Boonyen Headless Stand-In

== Original soundtrack ==
- "Tee doen-thang klap ma" (ธี่เดินทางกลับมา; "Returning"), ending theme by Kan The Parkinson
- "Prod terd duang jai" (โปรดเถิดดวงใจ; "Please, Darling"), ending theme by Tool Thongjai

== Production and background ==
Death Whisperer is based on a story posted on Pantip.com in late May 2015 which had received over 2,000 comments and had been forwarded over 130,000 times. The story was rewritten as a novel, Tee Yod...Waew Siang Kruan Klung (ธี่หยด...แว่วเสียงครวญคลั่ง, "Tee Yod...The Beginning of Madness"), released in 2017 by the same author. A few months before the film was released, the story was told again on radio during a program about ghost stories. Krittanon, the author, claims the story is something that happened to his mother's family in central Thailand when she was 15 years old.

The term "Tee Yod", originating from a mysterious woman in a black dress, remains enigmatic in both its meaning and linguistic origin. It has been suggested that it might be from the Mon language. However, Ong Bunjoon, an expert in Mon arts and culture, said that this term has no meaning. Moreover, he had never heard this word before, and if there is any word with a similar pronunciation, it would be Tae Yod (แตะ โหยด) which means "waist swing".

Taweewat Wantha, the director of the film, confirmed that he took inspiration from the 1981 film The Evil Dead for the haunting scenes.

A prayer ceremony was conducted at Channel 3 Studio, Nong Khaem on April 24, 2023 before the film began shooting on April 26. Before August 9, 2023, the filmmakers released a poster for the film. On September 6, 2023, the first teaser trailer was released and the cast was officially announced.

Later, on September 25, 2023, Major Cineplex, IMAX Corporation and Major Join Film jointly announced the release of the film on IMAX. The film was shot using an IMAX-certified camera, and remastered with IMAX DMR technology. It is the first Thai movie to be shown in IMAX theaters and Krungsri IMAX at all seven official branches in Thailand.

On September 28, 2023, Channel 3 and M Studio held a prayer ceremony and press conference to launch the film at the front yard of Maleenont Tower Building (Channel 3).

Most of the filming locations were in Kanchanaburi province, a place where Krittanon claims is the location mentioned in the novel. The large tree where the ghost first appears is a real tree. The art direction team did a mock-up of the lower trunk to make it look more menacing. The temple fair scenes were filmed at Wat Nong Bua Khon, Nakhon Nayok province.

Jampa Saenprom, who portrayed Chauy, had previously appeared in many other films, but she felt that audiences remember her more for her role in Death Whisperer. She said the most difficult scene was the one where she performed a black magic ritual and had to urinate in a baat (monk's alms bowl), which Thai people consider sacred.

== Release and reception ==
A gala premiere for Death Whisperer was held on October 24, 2023 at Infinity Hall, Siam Paragon, and was attended by the entire cast and crew. The pre-show started on 7:00 p.m. of October 26, 2023 only in Major Cineplex, IMAX theater and selected SF Cinema, Zigma CineStadium theater. Krittanon's mother also attended the event.

On its first day of screening on October 26, 2023, the film earned 39 million baht, making it the Thai film with the highest grossing opening of the year. Over three days, it had grossed 100 million baht. After five days, it grossed 300 million baht, making it the fastest-grossing Thai film of the year. The film was released in Singapore on December 14 by Golden Village and KillerMud Films. Death Whisperer was also released in Malaysia and Brunei by mm2 Entertainment and Shanghai Pictures on January 4, 2024 and in the Philippines by Pioneer Films on February 21. Later, it made a record of being the 9th highest grossing Thai film of all time in Bangkok and Chiang Mai.

After the film had been in theaters for about a month and had made a lot of money, Channel 3 and Major Join Film, the copyright owners, arranged the lowest ticket price to only 69 baht, and in the IMAX system it was only 99 baht.

Until the beginning of December, the end of the program, the ticket price was only 39 baht.

In Singapore, the film received mixed reviews. Cherlynn Ng of The New Paper writes that "the well-paced film blends a compelling narrative, memorable characters and an atmosphere oozing with unease," while Douglas Tseng of 8 Days compared the film with other horror films that were released in Singapore and wrote "it’s tough not to go in feeling" indifferent.

On April 10, 2024, Death Whisperer was released on Netflix. From September 19 to September 25, it was re-released exclusively in IMAX theaters for only 99 baht, along with 6.46 minute-special cut from the beginning of the sequel after the credits.

As part of the promotion for part 3, Death Whisperer made its special broadcast on Channel 3 on September 28, 2025, at 8:30 p.m. This marked the first time the series was shown on free-to-air television.

== Sequel ==
In an interview on Channel 3's Hone-Krasae program, Taweewat Wantha said that a sequel is very possible. Moreover, the film itself seems to convey the same meaning. The ending scene shows Yak invading and destroying the broken spirit house and the large tree which is the habitat of the woman in the black dress, and concluded by saying, "This is not the end" along with seeing a woman in a black dress in the reflection of his eyes.

On January 31, 2024, Nadech Kugimiya, who plays the role of Yak, gave an interview at an event that Death Whisperer Part 2 is preparing to start filming in March. Nadech further said that he went to talk with the producer and director at the end of last year after the success of the first film and wanted to make a second part because he thought some viewers were annoyed by the black-robed ghost and wanted to know when how and when revenge will be obtained and who will it come from? The second part will probably tell the story here and there will be further discussion about the details and story of this part.

== See also ==
- Pop (ghost)
