= Rusameekae Fagerlund =

Thai-American actor and volleyball player (born 1986)

- รัศมีแข ฟ้าเกื้อล้น
- Born: James Fogerlund; 5 August 1986 (age 39); Phuket, Thailand
- Other name: James Rusameekae
- Occupations: Actor; volleyball player
- Years active: 2015–present
- Known for: The Leaves; Physical: Asia
- Spouse: Jonas Palmer

Rusameekae Fagerlund (Thai: รัศมีแข ฟ้าเกื้อล้น, RTGS: Ratsamikhae Fakuealon; born James Fogerlund on 5 August 1986), also known as James Rusameekae, is a Thai-American-Senegalese actor, volleyball player, and celebrity boxer. He is best known for appearing in the 2017 TV series Club Friday to Be Continued: Friends, Foes and the 2019 series The Leaves. In 2025, he was part of Team Thailand in the South Korean reality series Physical: Asia.

== Biography ==
=== Early life ===
Rusameekae Fagerlund, who never met his Senegalese father, was born in Phuket province, Thailand, and lived there until he was ten. He then moved to Sweden with his mother.

=== Acting career ===
After returning to Thailand, Fagerlund applied for acting work with GMM Grammy, as a protégé of Thai actor Saksit Tangthong. He has since gone on to appear in several films and television programs, including Club Friday to Be Continued: Friends, Foes (2017), The Leaves (2019), Why R U? (2020), and Pen Tor (2024). In 2025, he was part of Team Thailand in the South Korean reality series Physical: Asia, and he starred in the supernatural comedy film The Red Envelope.

=== Volleyball ===
Fagerlund competed in the 2022–2023 Men's Volleyball Thailand League for Diamond Food Men's Volleyball Club.

=== Personal life ===
Fagerlund, who identifies as gay, married his longtime partner, Jonas Palmer, in 2019.

== Selected filmography ==
=== Film ===
List of film appearances, with year, title, and role shown
Year	Title	Role	Notes
2015	Love a ru mi rai rak arai mai ru	Jesse	
2019	Mr. Due Kantha Thongthong	Sister Ann	
2021	Dark World	Happy	
2023	Tid Noi	Duang	
2025	The Red Envelope	Rambo	

=== Television ===
List of film appearances, with year, title, and role shown
Year	Title	Role	Notes
2019	Nang Marn	Massey	22 episodes
2019	The Leaves	Baitong	21 episodes
2020	Why R U?	Kae	
2021	Switch of Fate	Fiat	16 episodes
2022	My Coach	Bobby	16 episodes
2022	Superstar 2550	Fai	2 episodes
2022	Jenny AM/PM	Pad	12 episodes
2023	Muay Sading Mat Sing Saifah	Jao	30 episodes
2023	The Cheery Lee, Village Headman	Khaosali	27 episodes
2023	Valentine's Again		9 episodes
2024	The Cruel Game	Luknam	16 episodes
2024	Bangkok Blossom	Ra-an	8 episodes
2024	Nak Top Ban Khok Pang	Jenny	24 episodes
2024	Pen Tor	Pele	
2025	Rak Salap Lai	Iconic Thai Designer board member	14 episodes
2025	Physical: Asia	Contestant	12 episodes
