= LAZ1 =

Thai boy band

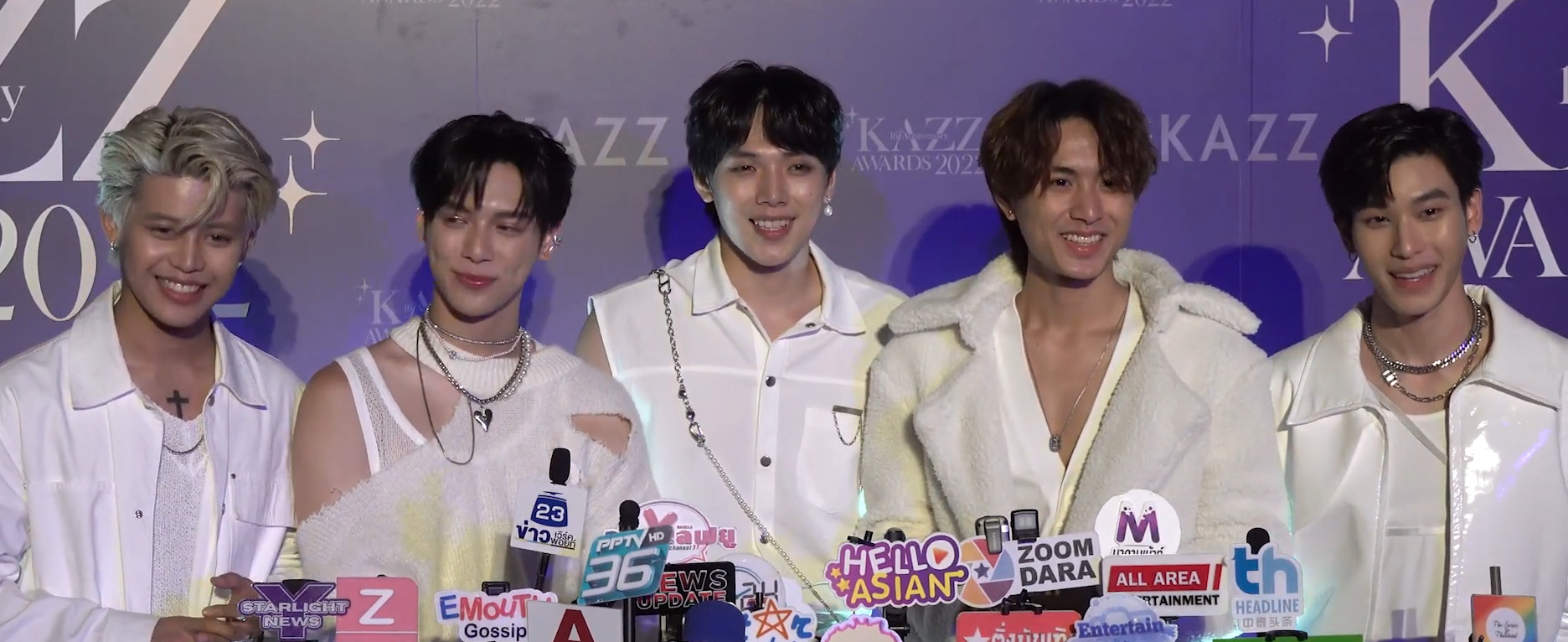
- LAZ1 in 2022; L–R: Geler, Pentor, Daou, Diamond, Offroad

Background information
- Origin: Bangkok
- Genres: T-pop; Pop
- Years active: 2022–2023
- Labels: One Music; GMM Grammy
- Members: Pittaya Saechua (Daou); Kantapon Jindataweephol (Offroad); Narakorn Nichakulthanachot (Diamond); Kritimuk Chanchuen (Geler); Jeerapat Pimanprom (Pentor)

LAZ1 (Thai: ลาซวัน) was a Thai boy band under One Music, a subsidiary of GMM Grammy. All of the band members are winners from the show Laz Icon, Icon Pop Top Debut, who have been signed as artists under One 31 under Exact-Scenario Company Limited, a subsidiary of The One Enterprise. They are considered a sub-unit of the idol group Day One, which is a group of new artists from One 31, more than 30 people.

== History ==
=== Pre-debut ===
LAZ1 originated from the competition program Laz Icon Icon Pop Top Debut, which was a collaboration between One 31 and Lazada between October 9, 2021 – January 9, 2022. It brought together over 35 trainees from various agencies to select 5 winners from votes by the program's viewers.

Before their debut, One Music launched a special project, "LAZ iCON Road to Debut," to thank the five members for their continued support. The project included the release of two special songs: "Rak Diao" (from the sitcom Rak Diao) by Lazy Loxie, which was re-sung, and "LAST LOVE," a special song that was first performed on the final round of LAZ iCON. Including joining in the sitcom "Rak Diao" and debuting as a sub-unit of the idol group "Day One" through the show "ONE Sanan Jor..Ma Naen Naen" on March 12, 2022.

=== Debut ===
On March 21, 2022, One Music officially announced the group's name as "LAZ1" and gave fans the opportunity to participate in naming the group's fan club. On the following day (March 22), there was a live broadcast from One 31's newsroom in the GMM Studio building for the first time via social networks under the name LAZ1 LIVE 1ST NIGHT TO MEET YOU. The fan club name was announced as "LAZER" (laser), which comes from the word LASER, which means a beam of light that passes through until it becomes one light, similar to each drama's fan club that supports and votes for their own trainees until there are 5 winners in the competition. Another meaning comes from the words LAZ and -er, which together mean the creator or creator of LAZ1. The band's official colors are black and blue.

Later on March 27, One Music announced the band's official debut stage under the name CAN WE BE YOUR LAZ1, with the official debut stage scheduled for April 7, 2022, at CentralWorld Square, CentralWorld shopping center. On the same day, GMM Grammy will also release their official debut single and music video simultaneously.

=== Project's Closure ===
Afterward, the band announced the project's closure, holding the ONCE LAZ1 GOODBYE PARTY concert, the band's final concert, at Muangthai Rachadalai Theatre on March 11, 2023.

== Member ==
Rank	Birth name	Nickname	Agency
1	Pittaya Saechua	Daou	Exact Scenario
2	Kantapon Jindataweephol	Offroad	Exact Scenario (Atime26)
3	Narakorn Nichakulthanachot	Diamond	Exact Scenario
4	Kritimuk Chanchuen	Geler	Exact Scenario (Handsome Entertainment)
5	Jeerapat Pimanprom	Pentor	Exact Scenario (Insight Entertainment)

== Discography ==
=== Digital singles ===
Years	Title	Notes	Ref.
2021	"ที่หนึ่งในใจของเธอ" (LAST ONE)	Performed with the LAZ Icon contestants (LAZboy)	
2022	"รักเดียว"	SPECIAL SINGLE FROM "LAZ iCON Road to Debut"PROJECT	
2022	"LAST LOVE"	SPECIAL SINGLE FROM "LAZ iCON Road to Debut"PROJECT	
2022	"TASTE ME"		
2022	"ถ้าจูบได้เพียงหนึ่งครั้ง" (LASE KiSS)		
2022	"รักในวันฝนมา"	Flash Marriage (OST); Feat. DIAMOND x CINCIN IRADA	
2022	"ไม่ตอบเลยน้า" (What's the matter?)		
2023	"อุ๊ย คุณพระ!" (OMG)	Phra Nakhon 2410 (OST)	

=== Music video ===
Years	Title
2022	"รักเดียว"
2022	"LAST LOVE"
2022	"TASTE ME"
2022	"ถ้าจูบได้เพียงหนึ่งครั้ง" (LAST KISS)
2022	"รักในวันฝนมา" Feat.CINCIN Diamond NARAKORN (Flash Marriage (OST))
2022	"ไม่ตอบเลยน้า" (What's the matter?)
2023	"อุ๊ย คุณพระ!" (OMG)

== Concerts, Fan meeting and activities ==
Date	Title	Location	Notes	Ref.
July 20, 2022	Mellow POP MOVE TO CHANGE	MBK Center, Thailand	-	
July 23, 2022	LAZ1 First Date Private Party Presented By LAZADA	Central Ladprao, Thailand	-	
October 15, 2022	Octopop	Rajamangala National Stadium, Thailand	-	
October 22, 2022	LAZ1 1st PHOTOBOOK FANSIGN	Lido Connect, Thailand	-	
October 22, 2022	Thai-Japan Iconic Music Fest 2022	ICONSIAM, Thailand	-	
October 29, 2022	T-POP Concert Fest	Queen Sirikit National Convention Center, Thailand	-	
December 11, 2022	Big Mountain Music Festival 12th	The Ocean Khao Yai Nakhon Ratchasima, Thailand	-	
March 11, 2023	ONCE LAZ1 GOODBYE PARTY	Muangthai Rachadalai Theatre	-	
April 8, 2023	T Wave Music	Central Bangna	-	
April 13, 2023	INTERNATIONAL AMAZING SPLASH 2023	Chulalongkorn University Centennial Park	-	
April 14, 2023	WATERBOMB BANGKOK 2023	Thunderdome Stadium (football field), Nonthaburi province	-	
