= Songsit Roongnophakunsri =

Thai singer and actor

- ทรงสิทธิ์ รุ่งนพคุณศรี
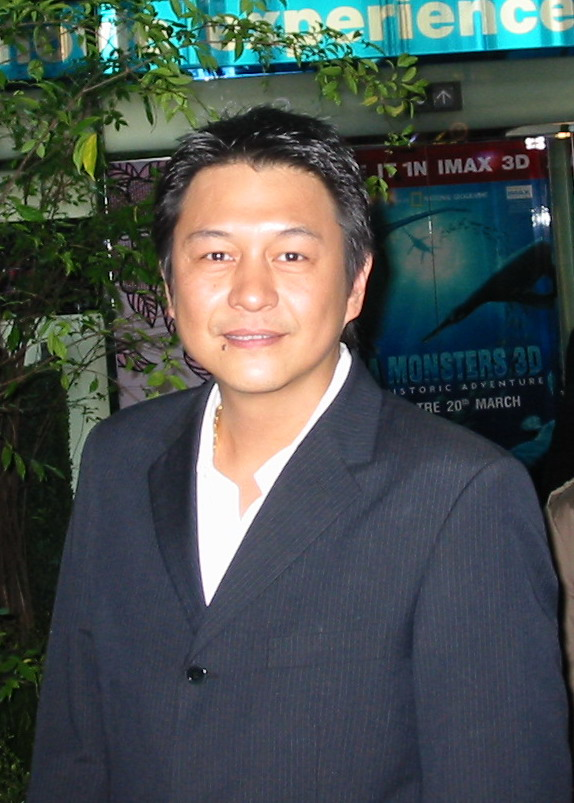
- Born: 6 May 1967 (age 59); Phra Nakhon, Thailand
- Other name: Kob (กบ)
- Education: Bangkok University
- Occupations: Singer; actor; host
- Years active: 1988–present
- Label: GMM Grammy
- Spouse: Sirirat Tubtim (m. 2007)

Songsit Roongnophakunsri (Thai: ทรงสิทธิ์ รุ่งนพคุณศรี, RTGS: Songsit Rungnopphakhunsi; born 6 May 1967), nicknamed Kob (กบ), is a Thai singer and actor. He became known for the song "Patihan" (ปาฏิหาริย์) from his 1990 album Kob Sai Sai (กบใส ๆ) and the sitcom Sam Num Sam Mum, which ran from 1991 to 1998. He released four original albums with GMM Grammy between 1989 and 1994, and has had acting roles in numerous television series, as well as stage musicals and films.

== Discography ==
=== Studio albums ===
Year	Title	Details
1989	Burn (เผื่อใจไว้)	Released: 1989; Label: GMM Grammy; Formats: Cassette, CD
1990	Kob Sai Sai (กบใส ๆ)	Released: 1990; Label: GMM Grammy; Formats: Cassette, CD
1992	Khor Thran Klub Jai (ขอแสดงความนับถือ)	Released: 1992; Label: GMM Grammy; Formats: Cassette, CD
1994	A-Sia-Kha-Boi (รักเราไม่เก่าเลย)	Released: 1994; Label: GMM Grammy; Formats: Cassette, CD

=== Compilation albums ===
- Khor Klub Jai: Ruam Phleng Hit (ขอแสดงความนับถือ รวมเพลงฮิต) (1993)
- The Best Selected: Kob Songsit (2002)
- Forever Love Hits: Kob Songsit (2010)
- Signature Collection of Kob Songsit (2018)

=== Project & Collaboration albums ===
- Sam Num Sam Mum Project (3 หนุ่ม 3 มุม) (1991–1998) – with Saksit Tangthong and Patiparn Patavekarn
- Grammy Karaoke: Kob-Saksit-Mos (1992)
- Khu Hu Hit: Kob-Saksit (1993)

=== Notable singles & Ost. songs ===
- "Patihan" (ปาฏิหาริย์) (1990)
- "Toem Jai Hai Kan" (เติมใจให้กัน) (Ost. Phrik Khi Nu Kup Mu Ham) (1989)
- "Rak Rao Mai Kao Loei" (รักเราไม่เก่าเลย) (1994)
- "Khit Thueng Lae Huat Yai" (คิดถึงและห่วงใย) (Ost. Sam Num Sam Mum) (1991)
- "Sai Samphan" (สายสัมพันธ์) (Ost. In Family We Trust) (2018)

== Filmography ==
=== Film ===
Year	Title	Role
2004	Be True	Wachara
2007	Love of Siam	Korn
2012	Friends Never Die	Gun's father
2012	First Kiss	KriangKrai
2020	Go Away, Mr. Tumor	
2025	The Snake Queen	Sutad (Anna's father)

=== Television ===
Year	Title	Role
1989	Roong Taeng See	Prak
1989	Songkram Ngern	Pantum
1990	Kamin Gub Poon	Thana
1991	Sam Noom Sam Moom	Ekkapol
1993	Proong Nee Chun Ja Rak Khun	Nont
1993	Nam Sor Sai	Pongsanit Jittrakam
1995	Pit Payabaht	
1995	Keu Hat Ta Krong Pi Pob	Sukon
1995	Reun Manut	Dum
1997	Nang Sao Mai Jam Kad Nam Sakul	Rachan
1997	Niramit	Sonthit
1997	Ngern Ngern Ngern	Rangsan
1998	Phua Rot Manao	Sutrit
1998	Ubathteehet	Viroj
1998	Prateep Athitarn	Kalan
1998	Cha Poh Hua Jai Jai Tur	Wat
1999	Kharm See Tan Dorn	Lam-Tarn
1999	Ni Yai Ruk Paak Song	Puri
1999	Peek Thong	Ponwat
2000	Fai Ruk Fai Pitsawat	N/A
2000	Muang Maya	Cholathit
2000	Tai Lom Mai Leuy Reun Sira	Sitrin Susira
2001	Ngao Prissana	Teacher Jun
2001	Chai Krab Pom Pen Chai	Suksan
2001	Pinprai	Nimit
2002	Sai Lom Kub Saeng Dao	Phon
2002	Champion Sabad Chor	
2003	Prajun San Gon	Ekkarat
2005	Dao Lhong Fah	Watcharin / Gai
2005	Pan Din Hua Jai	Pol
2005	Mer Wan Fah Plean See	
2006	Jao Sao Kathanhan	Chai
2007	Hua Jai Sila	Pilaa
2007	Maya Pissaward	John
2009	Waan Jai Yai Thaang Dao	Siasamroeng
2009	Dum Kum	Sia DamKoeng
2009	Meu Narng	Danai Udompat
2009	Plerng See Roong	Khanit
2009	Yark Yood Tawan Wai Tee Plai Fah	Norakan
2010	Neur Mek	Akat
2010	Dok Ruk Rim Tang	Winai
2011	Plerng Torranong	Pat
2011	Sood Hua Jai Jao Chai Tewada	Thao Kurepan
2011	Tawee Pope	Jao Khun Visarn Kadee
2011	Nang Fah Mafia	Rueangrit
2011	Kol Ruk Luang Jai	Thut
2012	Likit Fah Cha Ta Din	Peter Joe / Peter
2012	Manee Dan Suaang	Thongthio
2012	Tawan Chai Nai Marn Mek	KroekKrai
2013	Suphapburut Juthathep	M.C. Witchakorn Juthathep / Thun Chai Wit
2013	Khun Chai Ronapee	M.C. Witchakorn Juthathep / Thun Chai Wit
2013	Maya See Mook	Katha
2013	Anko Kon Ruk Strawberry	Burin
2013	Bodyguard Sao	Umphon Detchodom
2013	Look Mai Kong Por Series: Tai Rom Bai Pak	Kroekkriat Dechathon
2014	Nai Suan Kwan	Chian
2014	Fai Nai Wayu	Chatri Thanakun
2014	Leh Nangfah	Adisak
2014	Wiraburut Kong Khaya	Heng
2014	Raak Boon 2	Wanan
2014	The Rising Sun: Roy Ruk Hak Liam Tawan	Osamu Maki
2014	The Rising Sun: Roy Fun Tawan Duerd	Osamu Maki
2014	Sam Bai Mai Thao	Atsada Audsawaruangchai
2015	Hua Jai Patapee	Thawon
2015	Luead Mungkorn: Singh	Tang Cheng Yang
2015	Pan Rak Organic	Salita's father
2015	Luead Mungkorn: Krating	Tang Cheng Yang
2016	Padiwarada	Tan Jao Khun Bumruongprachakit
2016	Payak Rai Ruk Puan	Yossapon
2016	Man Dok Ngew	Chonlathep
2016	Buang Atitharn	Atin / General Phunna
2016	Nang Eye	Denchart Anothai
2017	Paen Rai Long Tai Warak	Paat Prakaypetch
2017	Sai Tarn Hua Jai	Yingyot
2018	Sanae Rak Nang Sin	Barami
2018	Dok Yah Nai Payu	Praween
2018	Tai Peek Pak Sa	Sarath
2018	In Family We Trust	Prasert Jiraanan
2018	Duay Raeng Atitharn	General Prapoj
2019	The Man Series	Saksit
2019	Plerng Naka	Kongpop
2019	Phatu Kat	Lieutenant general Kittibodin
2019	My Love From Another Star	Rot
2019	Until We Meet Again	Mr. Wongnate
2020	Woon Ruk Nakkao	Somkid Narupat
2020	Who Are You	Korn (Gun's father)
2020	Neth Mahunnop	Saengchan
2020	3 Num 3 Mum x2	Ekkapol (Ake)
2021	Song Sanaeha	Songchai
2021	Dare to Love	Phong (Q's father)
2021	Love under the Moonlight	Traibhumi
2021	Don’t Say No	Leo’s father
2021	Help Me Khun Pee Chuay Duay	Viharn
2021	Oh My Sweetheart	Tul
2021	Somewhere Our Love Begins	Puchong
2021	55:15 Never Too Late	Songpol / Paul
2022	My Sweet Assassin	Athipat Boriboonsinsap
2022	KinnPorsche	Korn Theerapanyakul
2022	Friend to Enemy	Khamrong
2022	Finding the Rainbow	Thanin
2023	Love the Way You Lie	Wijak / Manop
2023	Chains of Heart	Zhou Jun Guo
2023	Be My Favorite	Thawi (Botkawee's father)
2023	Doctor Detective	Ram
2023	Ruean Chadanang	Jaran
2023	Tricky in Love	Phum Kamthornpuwanat
2024	The Cruel Game	Suwan
2024	Surviving Beauty	Phra Ong Chao Pathaphirangsan
2024	6th Sense Agency	Teng (Pa)
2024	Zodiac Slayer	Phethai
2024	My Secret Zone	Thanawat Thiraphaibul
2024	The Empress of Ayodhaya	Lord of Lopburi
2025	Thieves of Hearts	Suchat
2025	Rearrange	Nut's father
2025	Rak Overdose	Preecha (Tar's father)
2026	The School	Kosin
2026	Aroma of Affection	Phraya Phiphatkosa
2026	Whisper of Desire	Kuang
2026	The Evil Lawyer	Anan Methaneepaisal
2026	Black Coral	Mek
