= Pittaya Saechua =

Thai actor and singer (born 1998)

- พิทยา แซ่ฉั่ว
- Pittaya in 2026
- Born: 14 January 1998 (age 28); Bangkok, Thailand
- Other names: Daou (ต้าห์อู๋), Ou (อู๋)
- Education: Kasetsart University
- Occupations: Singer; actor; model
- Years active: 2022–present
- Agents: Insight Entertainment (2020–2021); Open Label (2024–present)
- Notable work: Yang in Love in Translation (2023); San in Century of Love (2024); Than in The Wicked Game (2025)
- Height: 183 cm (6 ft 0 in)
- Musical career
- Genre: Thai pop
- Instruments: Vocals
- Labels: One Music; Open Label
- Formerly of: LAZ1

Chinese name
- Traditional Chinese: 蔡有福
Transcriptions
Standard Mandarin
- Hanyu Pinyin: Cài Yǒufú

Pittaya Saechua (Thai: พิทยา แซ่ฉั่ว; born 14 January 1998), nicknamed Daou (Thai: ต้าห์อู๋), is a Thai actor and singer. He starred in Love in Translation (2023), Century of Love (2024) and The Wicked Game (2025). He represented Thailand in the inaugural Eurovision Song Contest Asia held in Thailand with the song "Aroma" alongside Mang.

== Early life ==
Pittaya was born in Bangkok, Thailand on 14 January 1998. He has Chinese ancestry. Pittaya spent the majority of his childhood with his grandmother while his parents were busy with work. After completing high school, he pursued a bachelor's degree in agricultural and resources economics at Kasetsart University.

== Career ==
In 2021, Daou participated on the survival show Laz Icon, hosted by One 31 in collaboration with Lazada. In the series finale, he finished in first place overall 3.969.473 votes, securing his place in the boy band LAZ1. In April 2022, Daou debut with LAZ1 with the release of their debut single "Taste Me". In September 2023, he made his solo debut with the debut single "Would You Mind?" (เป็นไรมั้ย).

In 2022, Pittaya made his acting debut as himself in the TV series Rak Diao. In 2023, he landed his first lead role in the series Love in Translation alongside Kantapon Jindataweephol (Offroad). In 2024, he debuted as San in the TV series Century of Love.

On 19 August 2026, the duo of Mang and Daou were one of ten competing artists selected for Thailand’s Chosen One with the song "Aroma". They won the competition on 27 September, earning them the right to represent Thailand in the Eurovision Song Contest Asia 2026 in Bangkok, Thailand in November. Both of them eventually finished second behind Philippines' Carmelle, getting a total of 170 points, 41 points behind the winner.

== Personal life ==
In 2022, Daou announced that he had been called up for military service starting in November of that year.

== Filmography ==
=== Film ===
Year	Title	Role	Notes	Ref.
2024	Out of the Nest	Arthur	Voice role, Thai version	
2024	404 Run Run	Nammon	Main role	
2024	Mufasa: The Lion King	Taka/Scar	Voice role, Thai version	
2026	The Debt Collector	Po	Main role, Netflix Original	

=== Television series ===
Year	Title	Role	Broadcaster	Notes	Ref.
2022	One Love (Rak Diao)	Himself	One 31	Guest role (Ep. 8)	
2023	Love in Translation	Yang Yan Feng	One 31	Main role	
2024	Century of Love	San	One 31	Main role	
2025	The Wicked Game	Than	One 31	Main role	
2026	Jet Lag Season 2	Ghost	One 31	Guest role (Ep. 20)	
2026	Juliet & Juliet	Himself	One 31	Guest role (Ep. 1)	
2027	Mon Merng Mang	Thayu	One 31	Main role	
2027	Our Love Stories	TBA	One 31	Main role	

=== Television shows ===
Year	Title	Broadcaster	Notes	Ref.
2021	Laz Icon	One 31	Contestant	
2024	Thailand Music Countdown	Channel 3	Host	
2026	Running Man Thailand	iQIYI Original	Regular Member	
2026	House 31	One 31	Himself (Ep. 3-4)	
2026	Thailand’s Chosen One	Channel 3	Contestant	
2026	Eurovision Song Contest Asia	Channel 3	Contestant	

== Discography ==
=== LAZ1 ===
Year	Title	Artist	Album	Notes	Ref.
2021	"ที่หนึ่งในใจของเธอ (Last One)"	N/A	Non-album single	Performed with the Laz Icon contestants (LAZboy)	
2022	"Last Love"	N/A	Non-album single	Laz Icon Road To Debut Project	
2022	"ถ้าจูบได้เพียงหนึ่งครั้ง (Last Kiss)"	LAZ1	Non-album single		
2022	"Taste Me"	LAZ1	Non-album single		
2022	"ไม่ตอบเลยน้า (What's the Matter?)"	LAZ1	Non-album single		
2023	"อุ๊ย คุณพระ! (OMG)"	LAZ1	Sassy Matchmaker OST		

=== Extended plays ===
List of extended plays, with selected details
Title	Details	Ref.
Limitless	Released: 10 July 2025; Label: GMM Music, One Music, Open Label; Formats: Digital download, streaming, box set; Tracklist: 1. "ละลาย (LaLaLye)"; 2. "โหลยโท่ย (Poor Boy)"; 3. "นิราศรักเอย (Farewell)"; 4. "White Rabbit"; 5. "อย่าขยับ (Don't Move)"	

=== Singles ===
==== As lead artist ====
Year	Title	Album	Label	Notes	Ref.
2023	"เป็นไรมั้ย (Would You Mind?)"	Non-album single	One Music		
2024	"ละลาย (LaLaLye)"	Limitless	One Music	Released as a pre-album single; later included on Limitless.	
2025	"โหลยโท่ย (Poor Boy)"	Limitless	One Music	Released as a pre-album single; later included on Limitless.	
2025	"นิราศรักเอย (Farewell)"	Limitless	One Music	Released as a pre-album single; later included on Limitless.	
2025	"White Rabbit"	Limitless	One Music	Released as a pre-album single; later included on Limitless.	
2025	"อย่าขยับ (Don't Move)"	Limitless	One Music		
2026	"ช้าช้า (Cha Cha)"	Non-album single	One Music		

==== Collaborations ====
Year	Title	Album	Label	Ref.
2025	"Rise and Shine (Olympop Theme Song)" (with Alex (Dice), Chokun (Proxie), Hannah (4Eve), Jung (Perses), Justmine (JMNK), Knomjean (MXFRUIT), Mabelz (Pixxie), Mang (Bamm), Nont Tanont, Oabnithi, Peemwasu (BUS), Tad (Atlas))	Non-album single	Tada Labels, LOVEiS	
2026	"แก้บน (Special Version)" (with Kantong Tungngern)	Non-album single	Grammy Gold	
2026	"กลิ่นราตรี (Aroma)" (with Mang)	Non-album single	LIT Entertainment	

==== As featured artist ====
Year	Title	Album	Label	Ref.
2024	"รักเธอทั้งหมดของหัวใจ (For My Brother)" (TorSaksit feat. Daou Pittaya)	Piano&i Plays the Bakery Songbook	Sony Music Entertainment Thailand	
2025	"หยุดรัก (Stop Loving)" (Zom Marie feat. Daou Pittaya)	Non-album single	ME Records	

=== Soundtrack appearances ===
Year	Title	Album	Label	Ref.
2023	"รักไม่รู้ประสา (Unknown Love)" (with Offroad Kantapon)	Love in Translation OST	One Music	
2024	"期待你 ชีไต้หนี่ (รอจะบอกคำนั้น Chinese Version) (Waiting to Tell You)"	Century of Love OST	One Music	
2024	"I Always Wanted a Brother" (with Natthawat Srirakij, Poonyapat Atiksawedparit, Nadech Kugimiya)	Mufasa: The Lion King OST (Thai Version)	Walt Disney Records	
2024	"We Go Together" (with Nadech Kugimiya, Kanda Witthayanuparpyuenyong, Parkpoom Sakornsathien, Kosin Pomiam)	Mufasa: The Lion King OST (Thai Version)	Walt Disney Records	
2024	"Brother Betrayed"	Mufasa: The Lion King OST (Thai Version)	Walt Disney Records	
2025	"มหัศจรรย์แห่งเรา (Magic Moment)"	When the Sun Meets the Star OST	Ch3ThailandMusic	
2025	"I Trust You"	The Next Prince OST	DMD Music	
2025	"เจ็บไม่จำ (Loop)"	The Wicked Game OST	One Music	
2026	"กลิ่นมาลี (Klin Malee)" (with Aheye Korranid)	Aroma of Affection OST	One Music	
2026	"ปลด (Release)"	Whisper of Desire OST	One Music	
2026	"ไว้ใจผิดคน (Trusting the Wrong Person)"	Brothers OST	Ch3ThailandMusic	

== Videography ==
=== Web series ===
Year	Title	Role	Publisher	Platform	Ref.
2023	OuRoad Close Friend	Himself	One Connection	YouTube	
2024	OuRoad Close Friend SS2	Himself	Open Label	YouTube	
2024	Wannabe Love	Judge	WanLove Music	YouTube	
2025	OuRoad Close Friend SS3	Himself	Open Label	YouTube	
2026	Ou-Road Close Friend Journey	Himself	One31, One Playground	YouTube	

=== Music video appearances ===
Year	Title	Artist	Album	Role	Label	Ref.
2023	"ง่ายๆ (Complete)"	Offroad Kantapon	Non-album single	Love interest	One Music	
2024	"เจ็บก็สิอดเอา (Stay Strong)"	Mang	Non-album single	Male lead	LIT Entertainment	
2025	"เจ็บไม่จำ (Loop)"	Pex Zeal	The Wicked Game OST	Love interest	One Music	
2025	"คนไม่มีหัวใจ (Heartless)"	Offroad Kantapon	The Wicked Game OST	Love interest	One Music	
2026	"Shake!"	Pixxie	Dust	Male lead	LIT Entertainment	

=== Live session collaborations ===
Year	Title	Artist collaborator(s)	Publisher	Platform	Ref.
2023	TorSaksit - Piano&i - Ep. 49: "รักแรก (First Love)"; "丢了你 (I Lost You)"; "ไม่ตอบเลยน้า (What's the Matter?)"	TorSaksit	TorBright Channel	YouTube	
2023	"เป็นไรมั้ย (Would You Mind?)"	Third (Tilly Birds)	One connection / One Music	YouTube	
2023	"เป็นไรมั้ย (Would You Mind?)"	Meentra Intira	One Music	YouTube	
2023	"เป็นไรมั้ย (Would You Mind?)"	Marc & Copper (BUS)	One Music	YouTube	
2023	"มองใจ (Look By Your Heart)"	Boom Saharat	One Music	YouTube	
2024	"รอจะบอกคำนั้น (Thai Version) (Waiting to Tell You)"	Karn The Parkinson	One Music	YouTube	
2024	"รู้ยัง (Do You Know Yet?)"	Jackie Jackrin	OTH Entertainment	YouTube	
2024	"ละลาย (Lalalye)"	Nice (Atlas), Gun (Proxie), Jung (Perses)	One Music	YouTube	
2025	"นิราศรักเอย (Farewell)"	Sayamo	One Music	YouTube	
2025	"นิราศรักเอย (Farewell)"	Gun Napat	One Music	YouTube	
2025	"อย่าขยับ (Don’t Move)"	UrboyTJ	One Music	YouTube	
2026	"ช้าช้า (Cha Cha)"	Gun (Proxie), Jung (Perses), Nice (Atlas)	One Music	YouTube	
2026	"คาตา (Kata)"	NuNew	NuNew Official / DMD Music	YouTube	

== Awards and nominations ==
Award nominations for Daou Pittaya
Year	Award	Category	Nominee(s)	Result	Ref.
2024	Thailand Social Awards	Solo Male Artist: Best Creator Performance on Social Media		Won	
2024	Maya TV Awards	Popular Vote: Best BL Screen Couple	with Kantapon Jindataweephol	Nominated	
2024	Y Universe Awards	Best Screen Couple	Century of Love (with Kantapon Jindataweephol)	Nominated	
2024	Y Universe Awards	Best Partnership of the Year	Century of Love (with Kantapon Jindataweephol)	Won	
2025	Weibo Thailand Culture Exchange Night	Most Self-Breakthrough Artist		Won	
2025	Howe Awards	Best Screen Couple	with Kantapon Jindataweephol	Nominated	
2025	Howe Awards	The 50 Influential People		Won	

Awards and achievements
Preceded by None	Thailand in the Eurovision Song Contest Asia (with Mang); 2026	Succeeded by TBD
