= Pentor =

Pentor may refer to:

- Pen Tor, a Thai television sitcom
- Pentor, the nickname and stage name of Jeerapat Pimanprom, a Thai singer and contestant in the South Korean–Chinese reality show Starlight Boys
