= One Music =

- Parent company: The One Enterprise
- Founded: 2013 (12 years ago)
- Founder: Takonkiet Viravan
- Status: Active
- Distributor: GMM Music
- Genre: T-pop
- Country of origin: Thailand
- Location: Bangkok

One Music (Thai: วัน มิวสิก) it is a record label of The One Enterprise Public Company Limited, a subsidiary of GMM Grammy Public Company Limited. Currently, it produces soundtracks for television dramas on One 31 and produces music for artists under One 31. GMM Music Public Company Limited is the music distributor and the record label executive is Kang - Korn Sirisorn, winner of The Star 10.
