= Thailand Music Countdown =

Thai music television program

- Logo used since 2024
- Genre: Music
- Created by: True CJ Creations
- Based on: M Countdown by CJ E&M
- Presented by: Suchada Sonphan; Pittaya Saechua; Michaela Olivia Baker; Chawarin Perdpiriyawong; Krit Ngamtanakijja; Krittin Sosungnern; Chayapol Khieoiem
- Country of origin: Thailand
- Original language: Thai
- No. of seasons: 2
- No. of episodes: 68

Production
- Camera setup: Multi-camera
- Running time: 50 minutes
- Production company: Exit 365

Original release
- Network: Channel 3 HD
- Release: 12 May 2024 – 19 January 2025
- Release: 18 May 2025 – 4 January 2026

Thailand Music Countdown (Thai: ไทยแลนด์ มิวสิค เคานต์ดาวน์) is a Thai music program broadcast on Channel 3 HD, based on the South Korean program M Countdown. True CJ Creations, a joint venture between Thai telecommunications conglomerate True Corporation and South Korea-based CJ E&M, obtained the rights to produce the show in a Thai format, in partnership with the production company Exit 365.

The show aims to support the Thai music industry by opening up space for Thai pop artists to showcase their potential and promote their new music through stage performances. The program first aired on 12 May 2024, airing on Sundays at 17:30 ICT on Channel 3 HD.

In August 2025, the show launched TMC Live Studio at Siam Paragon.

== Hosts ==
=== Season 1 ===
- Suchada Sonphan (Mabelz) of Pixxie
- Pittaya Saechua (Daou)
- Michaela Olivia Baker (MiQuella) of MXFRUIT
- Chawarin Perdpiriyawong (NuNew)

=== Season 2 ===
- Krit Ngamtanakijja
- Krittin Sosungnern of Perses
- Chayapol Khieoiem (Cheese) of Dice

== Series overview ==
| Season | Episodes | Originally released | | Timeslot (UTC+07:00) |
| Season | Episodes | First released | Last released | Timeslot (UTC+07:00) |
|---|---|---|---|---|
| 1 | 35 | 12 May 2024 | 19 January 2025 | Sunday 17:30 |
| 2 | 33 | 18 May 2025 | 4 January 2026 | Sunday 16:45 |

== Spotify T-Pop Now Hottest of the Month ==
Thailand Music Countdown partnered with Spotify to allow listeners to vote on the Spotify app, starting in August 2024, to pick the "T-Pop Now Hottest of the Month" artist to perform on the show.

List of Spotify T-Pop Now Hottest of the Month winners
| Year | Month | Artist | Title |
|---|---|---|---|
| 2024 | August | BUS | "แค่ไหนแค่นั้น (No Matter What)" |
| 2024 | September | Billkin, PP Krit | "ยอม (Surrender)" |
| 2024 | October | Gemini | "เหนื่อยหน่อยนะ (Someone Like Me)" |
| 2024 | November | Perses | "Bodyguard" |
| 2024 | December | Proxie | "Traffic" |
| 2025 | June | Perses | "เม้นหยอกๆ (Comment)" |
| 2025 | July | Offroad Kantapon | "แสร้ง (All Fake)" |
| 2025 | August | Daou Pittaya | "White Rabbit" |
| 2025 | September | Dice | "Billionaire" |
| 2025 | October | BUS | "BB" |
| 2025 | November | Fourth | "Side to Side" (feat. Mabelz Pixxie) |
