= The Leaves (TV series) =

2019 Thai television series

- Genre: Melodrama; Revenge
- Created by: The One Enterprise; Change2561; Keng Kwang Kang
- Based on: ใบไม้ที่ปลิดปลิว by Thommayanti
- Teleplay by: Wattana Weerayawattana
- Directed by: Ekkasit Trakulkasemsuk
- Starring: Pimchanok Luevisadpaibul; Puttichai Kasetsin; Yuranunt Pamornmontri; Pattaratida Patcharaveerapong; Wittaya Wasukraipaisarn; Keerati Mahaplearkpong; Juckkrit Amarat
- Opening theme: Ruk Tee Yark Luem - Piyanuch Suajongpru
- Ending theme: Bai Mai - Wichayanee Pearklin
- Country of origin: Thai
- Original language: Thai
- No. of episodes: 21

Production
- Producers: Takonkiet Viravan; Nipon Pewnen; Saithip Montrikul Na Ayutthaya; Vorarit Vaijairanai
- Running time: 75 minutes

Original release
- Network: One 31, Line TV, Netflix
- Release: June 11 – August 20, 2019

The Leaves (Thai: ใบไม้ที่ปลิดปลิว) is a 2019 Thai television drama based on a melodrama novel that reflects the problems of transgender people. of Wimon Chiamcharoen (Thommayanti) by The One Enterprise, Change2561 and Keng Kwang Kang, teleplay by Wattana Weerayawattana and directed by Ekkasit Trakulkasemsuk.

== Plot ==
The novel describes the social conditions in 1988 in a society that does not accept the existence of transgender people, transgender people are often seen as freaks, psychopaths, and some even commit suicide But when it was first made into a television drama in 2019 the perspectives on generational differences between the father and transgender son characters, transgender people's right to exist in society, and forgiveness and letting go of the past are added.

== Cast and characters ==
=== Main Cast ===
- Pimchanok Luevisadpaibul as Nira Kongsawat (after surgery)
- Puttichai Kasetsin as Chatchawee

Rangrong's husband and Nira's uncle-in-law

- Yuranunt Pamornmontri as Chomtawat Siriwat

Nira's father

- Pattaratida Patcharaveerapong as Rangrong Siriwat

Chomtawat's younger sister and Nira's aunt

- Keerati Mahaplearkpong as Manow
