= Boontham Huadkrathok =

Thai actor and comedian

Boontham Huadkrathok, also known as by stage name Sinum Chernyim (1 March 1954 – 1 December 2015) was a Thai actor and comedian. Sinum had 2 sons named Jeab Chernyim and Jack Chernyim Sinum's outstanding work was Bang Rak Soi 9 He played the role of A-Tu, husband of Na-Yao and father of Pang and Pik.

Sinum died on 1 December 2015 of cerebrovascular disease at HRH Princess Maha Chakri Sirindhorn Medical Center in Ongkharak

== Work ==
Stage

- Before become in Bangraksoi 9 on stage

Drama

- Phra Aphai Mani
- Bang Rak Soi 9
- Muu 7 Dedsaratee
- Koja Panako
- Tee Tagoonsong
- Fon Nguea
- Rak Ther Tukwan

Music

- Korruayduaykon
- Pitrak Pitsanulok

Other

- Wig 07
