= You & Me & Me =

- Theatrical release poster
- Directed by: Wanweaw Hongvivatana; Weawwan Hongvivatana
- Written by: Wanweaw Hongvivatana; Weawwan Hongvivatana
- Produced by: Banjong Pisanthanakun
- Starring: Thitiya Jirapornsilp; Anthony Buisseret; Supaksorn Chaimongkol
- Cinematography: Kritsada Nakagate
- Edited by: Manussa Vorasingha; Aekkarin Thungrach
- Music by: Chapavich Temnitikul
- Production companies: The One Enterprise; Jor Kwang Films
- Distributed by: GDH 559
- Release date: February 9, 2023 (Thailand)
- Running time: 120 minutes
- Country: Thailand
- Language: Thai
- Box office: ฿29.5 million

You & Me & Me (Thai: เธอกับฉันกับฉัน, RTGS: Thoe Kap Chan Kap Chan) is a 2023 Thai coming-of-age romance film written and directed by twin sisters Wanweaw Hongvivatana and Weawwan Hongvivatana. It stars Thitiya Jirapornsilp (Baipor), Anthony Buisseret and Supaksorn Chaimongkol (Kratae). The film follows identical twin sisters You and Me during the 1999 Y2K scare as their deeply intertwined lives are disrupted for the first time when they both develop romantic feelings for a boy named Mark.

Produced by The One Enterprise together with Jor Kwang Films and distributed by GDH 559, it was released on February 9, 2023, in Thai theaters.

== Plot ==
In 1999, amid global anxiety over the Y2K problem, identical twin high school students You and Me share an inseparable bond in Bangkok. Distinguished only by a distinctive mole on Me's cheek, they routinely swap identities. When You struggles in her math class, Me masquerades as her sister to take a remedial exam. During the test, a student named Mark notices Me forgot her pencil and breaks his own in half to share it. In return, Me shares her exam answers, sparking an immediate mutual attraction. However, Mark abruptly moves away before they can reconnect.

Meanwhile, severe financial strain and their parents' constant arguments force the twins' mother to take them to their grandmother's house in Nakhon Phanom province for the holidays. While there, You takes lessons to relearn the phin, a traditional Thai lute, and crosses paths with Mark, who works as the assistant instructor. Mistaking You for the girl who shared his pencil during the Bangkok exam, Mark treats her with kindness, causing You to quickly fall in love with him. Unaware of the initial academic encounter, You pursues a relationship with Mark. This leaves Me feeling isolated and left out, especially after Mark officially confesses his romantic feelings to You.

To cope with the changing dynamic, the twins begin alternating places so Me can date Mark under the guise of being You. The ongoing deception sparks tension and jealousy, resulting in a heated argument after Me intentionally confesses the truth to Mark. Shocked and confused, Mark distances himself from both sisters. Shortly after, You overhears a phone call revealing that her parents are finalizing their divorce and that her mother intends to split the twins up, taking Me to Bangkok. Feeling abandoned by both her family and Mark, You writes a goodbye letter and flees to the transit station.

That night, Me discovers the note just as news breaks of a fatal bus crash with no survivors, with You's name listed among the casualties. Fearing the worst, Me rushes to the station on Mark's motorcycle, devastated by the thought of losing her sister. However, she finds You safely asleep on a bench, having missed the doomed bus. The twins emotionally reunite, resolve to prioritize their sisterly bond, and You subsequently ends her relationship with Mark. It is revealed that You's name appeared on the casualty list because her identification had been stolen at the station by another passenger who boarded the bus.

The twins return to Bangkok as their parents separate. Recognizing their inseparable connection, their father agrees to let both girls stay under their mother's custody. Ultimately, the sisters choose their own paths: Me stays with their father in Bangkok, while You moves with their mother to Nakhon Phanom, utilizing mobile phones to maintain their unbreakable bond as they celebrate the New Year's Eve countdown into the millennium.

== Cast ==
The actors participating in this film are:

- Thitiya Jirapornsilp (Baipor) as You / Me
- Anthony Buisseret as Mark
- Supaksorn Chaimongkol (Kratae) as Nim (You and Me's mother)
- Natee Ngamnaewprom (Ton) as Eak (You and Me's father)
- Yasaka Chaisorn (Pu) as phin teacher
- Kantapon Jindataweephol (Offroad) as Toh
- Pasakorn Saisombut (Soda) as Joy
- Prachya Phathong (Tiger) as Kiew
- Mapord Nuttayothin (Ameen) as Mark's friend

== Production ==
Prior to directing You & Me & Me, twin sisters Wanweaw and Waewwan Hongvivatana had co-directed the 2019 television series Great Men Academy. Acclaimed director Banjong Pisanthanakun joined the project to mark his debut as a producer for another director's work, citing his fondness for the romantic script and feeling driven to bring its distinct scenes to the screen.

== Accolades ==
Award	Year	Category	Recipient(s)	Result
32nd Suphannahong National Film Awards	2023	Best Picture	GDH 559	Nominated
32nd Suphannahong National Film Awards	2023	Best Film Director	Wanweaw-Weawwan Hongvivatana	Nominated
32nd Suphannahong National Film Awards	2023	Best Screenplay	Wanweaw-Weawwan Hongvivatana	Nominated
32nd Suphannahong National Film Awards	2023	Best Leading Actress	Thitiya Jirapornsilp	Won
32nd Suphannahong National Film Awards	2023	Outstanding Cinematography	Kritsada Nakagate	Nominated
32nd Suphannahong National Film Awards	2023	Best Film Editing	Foolhouse Production	Nominated
32nd Suphannahong National Film Awards	2023	Best Sound Editing and Mixing	Narubett Peamyai, Kantana Sound Studio	Nominated
32nd Suphannahong National Film Awards	2023	Best Original Score	Chapavich Temnitikul	Won
32nd Suphannahong National Film Awards	2023	Outstanding Art Direction	Songsak Kamutira	Nominated
32nd Suphannahong National Film Awards	2023	Best Costume Design	Kasidej Sundararjun	Nominated
32nd Suphannahong National Film Awards	2023	Best Visual Effects	Ahingsaka Studio	Nominated
