= The Wicked Game =

2025 Thai television series

- Thai: เกม รัก ลวง
- Genre: Boys' love; Action; Drama; Romance; Thriller
- Written by: Chawanon Sarapat; Sarawit Phinyomit; Thanatcha Thaewiwong
- Directed by: Thanawat Panyarin; Santi Torwiwat
- Starring: Pittaya Saechua; Kantapon Jindataweephol; Nattawut Skidjai; Kritsakorn Kanokthorn; Monchanok Saengchaipiangpen; Arisara Wongchalee; Jakkrasin Atsavatanachai; Pitchaorn Wanarat; Kittipong Pluemprida
- Country of origin: Thailand
- Original language: Thai
- No. of episodes: 10

Production
- Running time: 50–60 minutes

Original release
- Network: One 31; iQIYI
- Release: 27 September – 29 November 2025

The Wicked Game (Thai: เกม รัก ลวง; RTGS: Kem Rak Luang, lit. 'Game Love Deceive') is a 2025 Thai action, romance, thriller and boys' love television series, starring Pittaya Saechua (Daou) and Kantapon Jindataweephol (Offroad).

The series aired from 27 September to 29 November 2025 on One 31, with an uncut version simultaneously released on iQIYI.

== Synopsis ==
The story follows Pheem (Kantapon Jindataweephol), the youngest heir of the powerful Yotsinpaisarn family, who returns after years away determined to take revenge on those who ruined his life and his mother's. Amid family conflicts, secrets and power struggles, he hires Than (Pittaya Saechua), a skilled former police officer, to serve as his bodyguard.

What begins as a professional relationship gradually develops into a romance, putting Pheem's plans for revenge at risk and exposing both men to increasingly dangerous situations.

== Cast and characters ==
=== Main ===
- Pittaya Saechua (Daou) as Than
- Kantapon Jindataweephol (Offroad) as Pheem Yotsinpaisarn

=== Supporting ===
- Nattawut Skidjai (Poh) as Thanet
- Kitsakorn Kanogtorn (Tongtong) as Jet
- Monchanok Saengchaipiangpen (Mo) as Risa
- Arisara Wongchalee (Fresh) as Nittaya
- Jakkrasin Atsavatanachai (Inn) as Phakphum
- Pitchaorn Wanarat (Peach) as Paan
- Kittipong Pluemprida (Pu) as Danai
- Theera Chutikul (Um) as Pan
- Prattakorn Kainan (See) as Boss

== Production ==
The series was announced by One 31 as part of its 2025 drama lineup. The project marked the reunion of Daou Pittaya and Offroad Kantapon as lead actors, this time in a production that combines romance, action and suspense.

The screenplay was written by Chawanon Sarapat, Sarawit Phinyomit and Thanatcha Thaewiwong, and directed by Thanawat Panyarin and Santi Torwiwat.

== Soundtrack ==
Year	Title	Artist	Notes
2025	"Jep Mai Jam (Loop)"	Pex Zeal	Series theme song
2025	"Jep Mai Jam (Loop)"	Daou Pittaya	Special version
2025	"Khon Mai Mee Hua Jai"	Offroad Kantapon	Series theme song

== Promotional events ==
Date	Event	Venue	Notes	Ref.
24 September 2025	The Wicked Game First Premiere	Siam Pavalai Royal Grand Theatre, Bangkok	Advance screening of the first episode for fans and media.	
1 November 2025	The Wicked Game Ep.6 Fan Screening	Cinema 15, SF World Cinema, CentralWorld	Special screening event for episode 6.	
29 November 2025	The Wicked Final Game	MCC Hall, Bangkok	Finale event and screening of the last episode.	
