= Yuranunt Pamornmontri =

Thai actor (born 1962)

Yuranunt Pamornmontri PCh PM
- ยุรนันท์ ภมรมนตรี
- Born: 2 January 1963 (age 63); Bangkok, Thailand
- Other name: Sam
- Education: Ramkhamhaeng University; Thammasat University
- Occupations: Actor; singer; politician
- Height: 1.80 m (5 ft 11 in)
- Spouse: Marisa Pamornmontri
- Children: Yurakarn Pamornmontri; Yurarisa Pamornmontri
- Parents: Prayoon Pamornmontri (father); Renu Pamornmontri (nee. Phibulpanuwat) (mother)
- Awards: Ganesha Awards; Best Honorary Actor 2023; Thakur - ฟ้า/ทาน/ตะวัน (2565) (Friends to Enemy, 2022)

Member of the House of Representatives
- In office 25 August 2011 – 22 May 2014
- Constituency: Party List (#63)

Personal details
- Party: Thai Rak Thai Party; People's Power Party; Pheu Thai Party

Signature
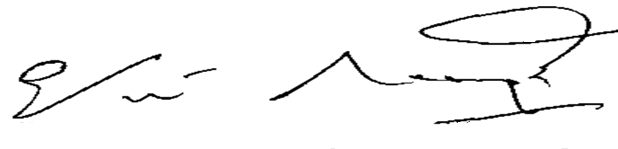

Yuranunt Pamornmontri (Thai: ยุรนันท์ ภมรมนตรี; RTGS: Yuranan Phamonmontri, nicknamed Sam; born 2 January 1963) is a Thai actor and politician. He was born in Bangkok and started his career as an actor, singer, host, later becoming a member of the House of Representatives from 2005 to 2006, during Thaksin Shinawatra's term as Prime Minister. He was elected as party-list MP again in the 2011 general election, substituting resigned Police Lieutenant General Chatt Kuldilok.

His father is Lieutenant general Prayoon Pamornmontri (พลโทประยูร ภมรมนตรี), one of the members of Khana Ratsadon, which successfully staged the Siamese revolution of 1932.

In 2019, He is returning to acting after an 11-year hiatus for his comeback lakorn titled ใบไม้ที่ปลิดปลิว (The Leaves (Thai television dramas)), His role is Chomwanat (ชมธวัช), Nira's father who homophobic and playboy. He hurts his wife and his own gay son, Chananthawat who turns into a transgender woman who takes revenge on those against her. He won the Best Comeback Awards in 2019.

== Acting career ==
His debut performance was in the 1981 film Kamphaeng Huachai (The Wall of the Heart), where he played the younger brother of Jarunee Suksawat. Following this, he fully immersed himself in the entertainment industry, taking on roles in films, television dramas, modeling, and singing.

Later, Yuranan joined the talent roster of Akkarasenee, managed by Pisal Akkarasenee. In 1985, he starred as the lead actor in a film for the first time in Nang Suea Dao (The Leopard Woman), opposite Wannisa Sriwichian, a fellow talent from the same agency. Pisal aimed to establish both as a beloved on-screen couple.

== Political career ==
He entered politics in 2004 and moved to Thai Rak Thai party in the same year. After a landslide victory in 2005 general election, he became Member of Parliament and the deputy Government Spokesman but on 19 September 2006 a military junta overthrew Thaksin's government in a bloodless coup while he was abroad. The CNS-appointed constitutional tribunal dissolved the Thai Rak Thai party for electoral fraud, banning TRT's executives from politics for five years.

Yuranan moved to People's Power Party (PPP) and lost the 2007 general election, but leader of PPP Samak Sundaravej, became the Prime Minister. Then he became the adviser of Minister of Education Somchai Wongsawat, who was the next prime minister.

In January 2009, he moved to Pheu Thai Party and was defeated in the 15th Bangkok gubernatorial election by Sukhumbhand Paribatra.

== Lawsuit ==
On October 16, 2024, Yuranunt was arrested along with Kan and Min Pechaya on charges of public fraud and introducing false information into a computer system.

Later, on January 8, 2025, the prosecutor reviewed Special Case No. 119/2024 and filed charges against The iCON Group and all suspects on the five offenses mentioned earlier, except for Sam—Yuranunt Pamornmontri, Suspect No. 17, and Min—Pechaya Wattanamontri, Suspect No. 18. The prosecutor decided not to indict them because both had signed contracts solely as presenters in 2023, which was two years after The iCON Group had been registered. As a result, the court ordered Yuranunt's release from the Bangkok Remand Prison that evening.

== Acting career ==
=== Films and television ===
- Kam Pang Hua Jai (1981)
- Kaew Kang Dong (1985)
- Nang Sua Dao (1985)
- Nang Fa Kub Satan (1985)
- Pai Sa Nee Seu Rak (1986)
- Mia Tang (1986)
- Chompoo Kam Mam (1986)
- Nang Sao Ka Wao (1986)
- Sian Sa Nae Ha (1986)
- Sin Sa Wart (1986)
- Woon Tee Sud Sa Dud Rak (1987)
- Fa See Tong (1987)
- Roon Aun Ra Weng (1987)
- Ta Wan Pleng (1987)
- Peek Marn (1987)
- Cha Ta Fa (1987)
- Ran Dong Ngaow (1987)
- Mia Nong Hua Jai (1987)
- Rang Pat Ta Na (1987)
- Kow Nam Plung (1987)
- Pu Pan Rua Pluang (1987)
- Fai Now (1987)
- Mia Kon Mai (1987)
- Pu Ma Ree See Tong (1988)
- Yua Tan Ha (1988)
- Viva Jam Rang (1988)
- Petch Rua Pleng (1988)
- Ta Rui Rong Mor (1988)
- Sa Wan Biang (1988)
- Rak Ma Ha Heng (1988)
- Saw Sam Sai (1988)
- Tan Ha Tuan (1988)
- Kon Klang Muang (1988)
- Set Tee Ngun Pon (1988)
- Pa Yak Nang Pa Ya (1988)
- Nong Bua Dang (1988)
- Keng Jing Na Mae Kun (1989)
- Hua Jai Hong Tee Ha (1990)
- Rang Rit Pit Sa Wat (1990)
- Rak Tur Ta Hua Jai Yak Ja Rak (1990)
- Aum Boon (1991)
- Pop Pee Fa (1991)
- Mae Ying (1991)
- Dong Mai Ruang Tee San Sai (1992)
- Di Chan Mai Chai So Pae Nee (1993)
- Ter Kong Rao Kong Kao Rur Kong Kai (1993)

=== TV dramas ===
Year	Title	Role
1982	Pit Ruk	
1984	Muer Ruk Rao	
1984	Kao E Khao Nai Hong Daeng	Tawan
1984	Taddao Bussaya	Jao Noi Yodkwan
1988	Sawan Biang	Kawee
1989	Mia Luang	Dr. Aniroot Sallawit
1989	Tao Saen Bpom	
1989	Kehas See Daeng	Doctor Ruj Rujiroj
1990	Oum Boon' (อุ้มบุญ)	
1991	Mae Ying (แม่หญิง)	Khun Kag / Praam Theparaj
1991	Mae Bia (แม่เบี้ย)	Chanacol
1992	Kon Barb (คนบาป)	
1992	Song Fah Klong (สงฟ้าคลอง)	
1993	Khon La Lok	Tibet
1993	Liam Look Mai	
1993	Maruettayu Yot Rak	
1993	Badarn Jai (บาดาลใจ)	Sakkarn Thanasak (Tor)
1994	Saeng Soon	Aysoon / Pasaworn
1994	Peak Marn	Puchai
1994	Krachao Seeda	Lue
1994	Hua Jai Laikram	Laikram
1995	Pi Nai Gum Morana	
1995	Maya Tawan	Khet-Tawan - เขตต์-ตวัน
1995	Kwarm Ruk See Dum	Lue - ลือ
1995	Prom Mai Dai Likit	Orachun - ออราชุน
1995	Ruea Manut	Date
1996	Pan Din Kong Rao	Tamrong
1996	Saap Norasing	Jao Sing Hatai / Norasing
1996	Cheewit Muean Fun	Luuve
1996	Karn Kridsanaา	Karn Petch
1997	Duang Jai Pisut	Haht
1997	Fah Lung Fon	
1997	Sawan Yang Mee Chan	
1997	Sao Chai Hi-Tech	Nol
1998	Bangkert Klao	Chatcharin
1998	Fai Rissaya	Pubadee
1998	Kratom Som Jun	
1998	Nang Barb	Nakarin
1999	Salak Jit	Pusit Kritsanarak
1999	Rang Naao	Matpon
1999	Dang Fai Tai Nam	Palit
2000	Nam Pueng Kom (น้ำผึ้งขม)	Purim
2000	Prakasit Ngern Tra	Wakim
2000	Ngao	Wasawat
2000	Tai Lom Mai Leuy Reun Sira	Pat
2001	Ruk Luang (รักลวง)	
2001	Fai Namkhang (ไฟน้ำค้าง)	Pheem
2002	Madame Yeehoob	Ekkarat
2002	Jom Jone Kon Pa Lok	
2002	Mae Yai Tee Ruk (แม่ยายที่รัก)	Wanrob
2003	Muang Maya The Series: Maya Luang (เมืองมายา: The Series: มายาลวง)	Phongsa Petch
2004	Sai Yai Ruk (สายใยรัก	Thanayong
2008	Trab Sin Dind Fah	Pan / Pitsanu
2019	The Leaves (Thai television dramas) (ใบไม้ที่ปลิดปลิว)	Chomthawat (Nira's homophobic father, Main antagonist) - ชมธวัช
2020	Her Desire (เพลิงนาง)	Chumsai - ชุมสาย
2021	Are We Alright? (กะรัตรัก)	Mark - มาร์ค
2022	Game Prattana (เกมปรารถนา)	Phee (Main antagonist) - พีย์
2022	Bad Romeo (คือเธอ)	Songsil Kidakan (Main antagonist) - ทรงศีล
2022	Friend to Enemy (ฟ้าทานตะวัน)	Thakun (Main antagonist) - ฐากูร
2023	My Lucky Star	Sakda (Main antagonist) - ศักดา
2024	Blondie in an Ancient Time (นางทาสหัวทอง)	Luang Kam (Main antagonist) - หลวงกุ่ม
2024	Past Life Present Love	Thana (Main antagonist) - ธนา
2025	Maya (มายา)	Itthi Isaraphat "It" (Main antagonist) - อิทธิ์ อิศราพัฒน์
2026	Money My Love (ก็รักมันปักใจ)	Trithos - (ตรีทศ)

=== TV series ===
Year	Thai title	Title	Role	Network	Notes	With
2020	Club Friday the Series 12 รักซ่อนเร้น ตอน บาปรัก	Club Friday the Series 12	Tree ตรี	GMM 25		Sakowjai Phoonsawat; Pijitra Siriwerapan; Sirinat Sukantarat

=== Host ===
- Jet See Concert
- Tiang Wan Kan Ang
- Loon Kam Roke
- Ha Hai

Year	Thai title	Title	Network	Notes	With
1898-1993	7 สีคอนเสิร์ต	Jet See Concert	Channel 7		Mayura Sawettasila
1994-2000	ลุ้นข้ามโลก	Loon Kam Roke	Channel 9		Rose Narisara
1997	ห้าให้ (ซึ่งต่อมาเปลี่ยนชื่อเป็น 5 มหารวย)	Ha Hai	Channel 5		
1995-1998	เที่ยงวันกันเอง	Tiang Wan Kan Ang	Channel 5		
1999	พยากรณ์ พยาเกม		Channel 5		Duangta Tungkamanee
1998-2000	นี่สิ ช่อง 9		Channel 9		Mayura Sawettasila
2000-2002	เกมนานาชาติ		Channel 5		
2001-2007	หลังคาเดียวกัน		Channel 3		
2008	รักจั๊กจี้		Channel 5		

== Discography ==
=== Songs ===
Year	Issued	Song title	English title	Drama	Views
1984		ทัดดาวบุษยา / Tat Dao Bussaya		Tat Dao Bussaya	
1996		ทาสรักนาง / Tas Rak Nang		Sab Norasing	

== Television Drama Performance Awards ==
=== Mekhala Award for Best Leading Actor ===
- Mekhala Award for Best Leading Actor from the drama "Sawan Biang" in 1988
- Mekhala Award for Best Leading Actor from the drama Kon Barb, 1992
- Mekhala Award for Best Leading Actor from the drama Kon La Lok, 1993
- Mekhala Award for Best Leading Actor from the drama "Kwan Ruk See Dum" (ความรักสีดำ)" (Black Love) in 1995
- Mekhala Award for Best Leading Actor from the drama Sab Nar Singh, 1996
- Mekhala Award for Best Leading Actor from the drama Fai Rissaya (ไฟริษยา), 1998

=== Ganesha Awards ===
- Ganesha Award for Best Leading Actor from the drama Friends to Enemy (ฟ้าทานตะวัน), 2023

== Theater organizer ==
All television drama work as a theatrical producer YUTTAKARN NETWORK COMPANY LIMITED

- 2001 ไฟน้ำค้าง
- 2002 คนเริงเมือง
- 2002 ต้นรักดอกงิ้ว
- 2002 สะใภ้ไฮโซ
