= Prayoon Pamornmontri =

Thai politician (born 1898)

- ประยูร ภมรมนตรี
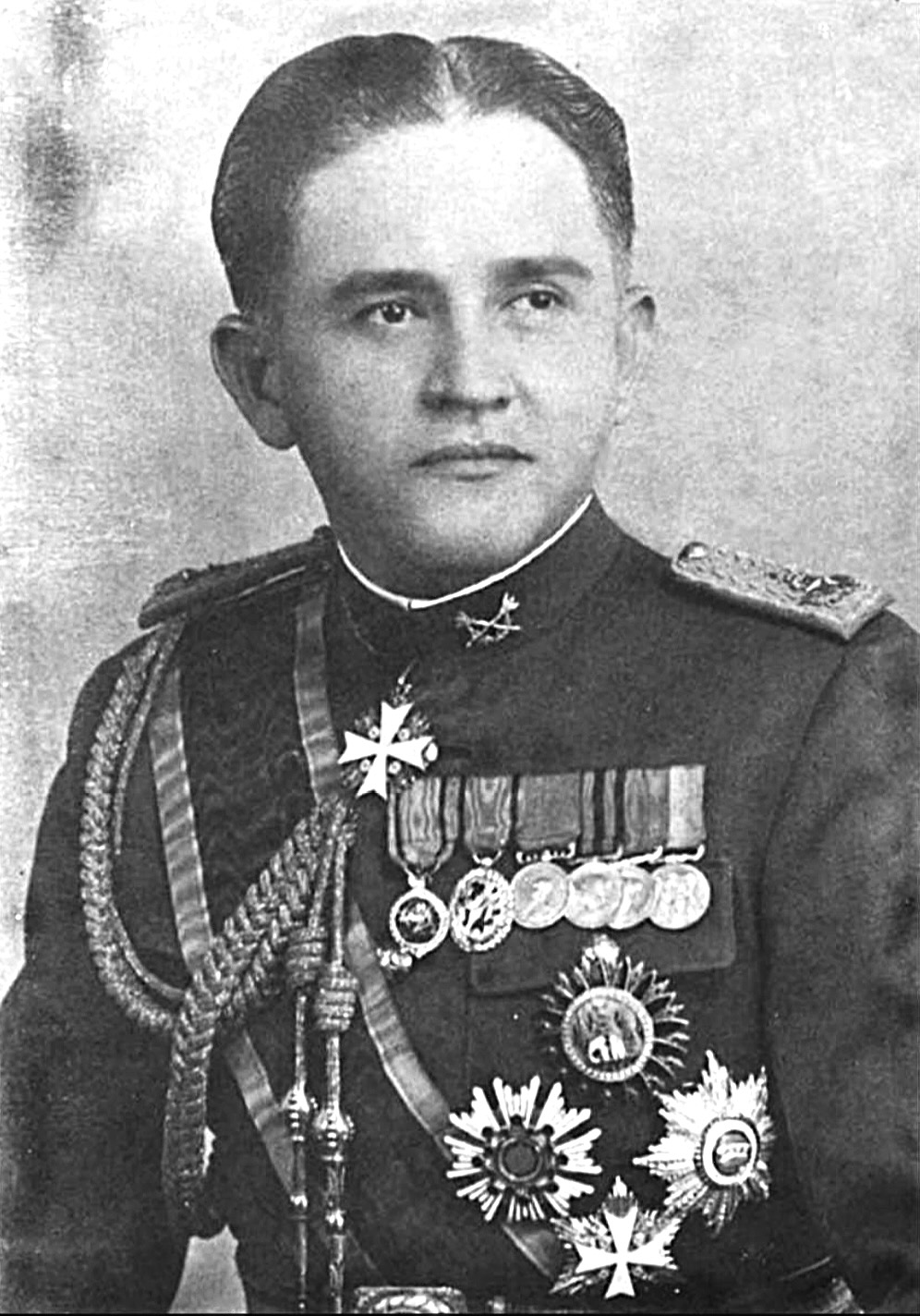
- Born: February 5, 1898; Berlin, German Empire
- Died: August 12, 1982 (aged 84); Ratchaprasong, Bangkok, Thailand
- Occupations: Politician; soldier
- Years active: 1932–1957
- Political party: Khana Ratsadon (1927–1947); Seri Manangkasila Party (1957)
- Spouses: Khun Ying Rasi Pamornmontri (née: Piratyothin); Renu Pamornmontri (née: Phibunphanuwat)
- Children: 5, including Yuranunt

Prayoon Pamornmontri

Military service
- Allegiance: Thailand
- Branch/service: Royal Thai Army; Volunteer Defense Corps
- Rank: Lieutenant General; VDC Gen.

Lieutenant General Prayoon Pamornmontri (Thai: ประยูร ภมรมนตรี, RTGS: Prayun Phamonmontri; 5 February 1898 – 12 August 1982) was a Thai soldier, politician, and member of Khana Ratsadon (People's Party). He participated in the Siamese Revolution of 1932 to promote democracy by overthrowing the absolute monarchy.

== Biography ==
Prayoon's Thai father was Major Yam Pamornmontri, and his German mother, Annelie Pamornmontri (née Feuer), was a physician. His mother also taught German to many Siamese cadets in the German Empire at the time, many of whom later became members of the Khana Ratsadon.

Prayoon, along with his identical twin brother, Prayong, served as a royal page to King Vajiravudh (Rama VI) during their childhood. When the twins grew up, they were both appointed royal guards. He resigned to study political science in Paris. While in Europe he traveled from Switzerland to Lyon to meet with fellow Siamese student, Khuang Aphaiwong. Khuang introduced him to Pridi Banomyong, the Paris-based leader of Siamese students in French.

In Paris, Pridi and Prayoon often spent their free time meeting in cafés or strolling the streets of Paris, talking about politics and the situation in Siam. This led to the creation of Khana Ratsadon, with Prayoon and Pridi as the first two members.

The first official meeting of Khana Ratsadon was held at rental no.9, Rue Du Sommerard on 5 February 1927, Prayoon's 30th birthday. His role in Khana Ratsadon was to contact and coordinate with other members.

After absolute monarchy was overthrown in Siam, he was appointed Minister of Education in the administration of Field Marshal Plaek Phibunsongkhram, the Prime Minister. After World War II, he was appointed Minister of Public Health (1954–1957). In the military, he founded the Volunteer Defense Corps (VDC) and ascended to the rank of lieutenant general.

He was elected as an MP for Chiang Mai as a member of the Seri Manangkasila Party in the February 1957 Thai general election.

Prayoon's eldest daughter Yaowapa Pamornmontri married to Sombud Tuchinda with five children. His youngest son is actor, singer, and politician Yuranunt "Sam" Pamornmontri.

Prayoon Pamornmontri died on 12 August 1982, aged 85, in a crash on a Bangkok city bus at Ratchaprasong Intersection.

== Honours and awards ==
=== Civil Service of Siam rank ===
- Prefect of The Secretariat of The Cabinet of Siam (Thai: รองอำมาตย์เอก)

Political offices
Vacant Title last held by Khuang Aphaiwong	Deputy Minister of Education; 1941–1942	Succeeded by Luang Supachalasai
Preceded by Plaek Phibunsongkhram	Minister of Education; 1942–1944	Succeeded by Thawi Bunyaket
Preceded by Saweat Piamphongsan	Deputy Minister of Finance; 1951–1955 with Phao Siyanon	Vacant Title next held by Saweat Piamphongsan
Vacant Title last held by Nom Ketnut	Deputy Minister of Public Health; 1954	Vacant Title next held by Sawat Khamprakop
Preceded by Phraya Borirakwetchakan	Minister of Public Health; 1954–1957	Succeeded by Fuen Ronnaphagrad Ritthakhanee
Assembly seats
Preceded by Phirun Intharawut; Sa-nguan Sirisawang; Prince Chainarong Na Chiangmai; Met Rattanaprasit	Members of the House of Representatives for Chiang Mai; 1957 with Worasak Nimmanan; Thongdi Isarachiwin; Rasi Singhanet; Sukich Nimmanheminda	Vacant Title next held by Worasak Nimmanan; Thongdi Isarachiwin; Prince Chainarong Na Chiangmai; Sukich Nimmanheminda; Kraisorn Tantipong
Government offices
First	Secretary to the Cabinet; 1932–1933	Succeeded by Luang Thamrongnawasawat
Academic offices
Preceded by Luang Sinthusongkhramchai	President of the Chulalongkorn University Council; 1942–1944	Succeeded by Thawi Bunyaket
Preceded by Luang Sinthusongkhramchai	President of the University of Moral and Political Sciences Council; 1942–1944	Succeeded by Thawi Bunyaket
