= Sam Noom Sam Moom =

Thai situation comedy (1991–1998)

Sam Noom Sam Moom or Three Men, Three Styles (Thai: 3 หนุ่ม 3 มุม, RTGS: Sam Num Sam Mum) is a Thai situation comedy originally broadcast from 1991 to 1998 on Channel 7 and aired every Saturday evening. It was created by Takonkiet Viravan for GMM Grammy subsidiary Exact, and starred Songsit Roongnophakunsri, Saksit Tangthong and Patiparn Patavekarn as the three titular brothers. It became Thailand's first widely popular sitcom, and launched the careers of its three main actors.
