= Jeerapat Pimanprom =

Thai musician and actor (born 1999)

Pentor Jeerapat Pimanprom
- จีรภัทร พิมานพรหม
- Pentor Jeerapat Pimanprom in July 2022
- Born: Jeerapat Pimanprom; July 10, 1999 (age 27); Phuket, Thailand
- Other names: Tor (ต่อ); PentorJrp; Yang Siwei; XiaoYang
- Education: Shanghai International Studies University (SISU)
- Occupations: Singer; Actor; Dancer
- Years active: 2021–present
- Agent: Insight Entertainment
- Height: 175 cm (5 ft 9 in)
- Musical career
- Genres: Pop; T-pop; k-pop
- Member of: POLARIX
- Formerly of: LAZ1

Chinese name
- Simplified Chinese: 杨斯维
Transcriptions
Standard Mandarin
- Hanyu Pinyin: Yáng Sīwéi

Jeerapat Pimanprom (Thai: จีรภัทร พิมานพรหม; born July 10, 1999), known professionally as Pentor, is a Thai singer and actor. He is best known for competing on the iQIYI and SBS reality competition show Starlight Boys, where he ranked 5th in the final episode, making him a member of POLARIX. Prior to this, Pentor was a member of the project boy group LAZ1. He made his solo debut on March 31, 2023 with the digital single "Buzzkill" and his debut as an actor in the series A Love So Beautiful (2024).

== Early life and education ==
Jeerapat Pimanprom was born on July 10, 1999, in Phuket, Thailand. Besides from his native language, Thai, he also speaks English and Chinese. As a student, he studied at Shanghai International Studies University (SISU) and holds a bachelor's degree major in Teaching Chinese to Speakers of Other Languages. Pentor won two awards: the "Distinguished Thesis Awards" and the "Diligence Award"

== Career ==
=== 2021–2023: Insight Entertainment, debut with LAZ1 and solo debut with "Buzzkill" ===
On January 29, 2021, Pentor, was introduced as a trainee under Insight Entertainment (as Tor). On July 1, 2021, it was announced that Pentor would take part in the Sandbox Project of Insight Entertainment, in the trainee group Insight Rookies. The group released the digital single "I Like U Summer" on July 5, 2021.

On September 25, 2021, he was revealed as a contestant for one31's survival show LAZ iCON. During the show's finale, he was revealed to have ranked 5th overall with 2,248,515 votes, thus making him a member of LAZ1. On April 7, 2022, Pentor made his debut in the group with the release of their debut digital single "Taste Me". LAZ1 disbanded on March 11, 2023, after their final event LAZ1 Goodbye Party "Once".

He made his solo debut on March 31, 2023, with the digital single "Buzzkill" under the stage name PentorJrp.

=== 2024–present: Acting debut, Starlight Boys and debut with POLARIX ===
Pentor made his acting debut on June 3, 2024 in the Thai series A Love So Beautiful where he played the supporting role of "New" Sassawat Jongcharoenniyom.

On September 30, 2024, Pentor was introduced as a contestant on the Chinese-South Korean survival show Starlight Boys. During the show's finale, he was revealed to have ranked 5th overall, thus making him a member of POLARIX.

== Discography ==
=== Singles ===
Year	Title	Note	Ref.
2023	"Buzzkill" (with F.HERO)		
2024	"Deep Talk"		
2024	"Parallel"		
2024	"How Luckyi'm"	Special singles	

=== Soundtrack appearances ===
Year	Song Title	Series/Movie
2025	Fading in Clarity (ยิ่งชัดยิ่งเลือนลาง)	Mystique in the Mirror ใครในกระจก

== Filmography ==
=== Series ===
Year	Title	Genre	Role	Network	Notes
2022	Rak Diao	Sitcom	Himself; Guest Role(Ep. 8)	One 31	
2023	Love in Translation	Mini Series	Guest Role (Ep. 4)	One 31	Passerby
2024	A Love So Beautiful	Series	"New" Sassawat Jongcharoenniyom; Support Role	GMMTV/TrueID/Tencent Video	Debut
2024	Love Sea	Series	Khom; Guest Role	GMMTV/iQIYI	
2025	Mystique in the Mirro	Mini Series	Darwin/Win; Main Role	iQIYI	Filmed 2 years before release (First role)
2026	The Chemistry	Series	Mek; Support Role	GMMTV/Tencent Video	
TBA	First Degree	TBA	Uea; Support Role	TBA	

=== Survival shows ===
Year	Title	Role	Network	Result
2021	LAZ iCON	Contestant	One 31 / LazLive	ranked 5th overall with 2,248,515 votes LAZ1
2022	The Star	Judge	One 31	-
2024	The Star	Contestant	iQIYI	ranked 5th overall POLARIX
2026	Shine Boys	Judge	Channel 3 (Thailand)	-

=== Music video appearances ===
Year	Title	Artist(s)	Note	Ref.
2023	"I'm a loser"	Benzkhaokhwan	MV cameo: one of the money thieves	
2023	โปรดมาเล่นคอนเสิร์ตที่ประเทศของฉัน	Syd Vethaka		

=== Television shows ===
Year	Title	Role	Notes
2022	Family Feud Thailand	Guest	Ep. 741
2022	Funday Season 7	Guest	Ep. 1
2022	Daily Show	Guest	Ep. 121
2023	Daily Show	Guest	Ep. 236
2023	Khun Phra Chuai	Guest	July 9, 2023
2023	DMD Friendship the Reality	Guest	Ep. 3, 6
2023	Bus the Debut Documentary	Guest	Ep. 1
2024	T-Pop Stage Show	Guest	May 23, 2024
2025	Thailand Music Countdown	MC	Ep. 15-16
