= Kantapon Jindataweephol =

Thai actor, singer and model

- กันตภณ จินดาทวีผล
- Offroad in 2026
- Born: 4 February 2000 (age 26); Hat Yai, Thailand
- Other name: Offroad
- Education: Srinakharinwirot University
- Occupations: Actor; singer; model
- Years active: 2022–present
- Agents: Atime26 (2022–2023); Open Label (2024–present)
- Notable work: Phumjai in Love in Translation (2023); Vee in Century of Love (2024); Pheem in The Wicked Game (2025)
- Musical career
- Genre: Thai pop
- Instruments: Vocals
- Labels: One Music; Open Label
- Formerly of: LAZ1

Kantapon Jindataweephol (Thai: กันตภณ จินดาทวีผล; born 4 February 2000), nicknamed Offroad (Thai: ออฟโรด), is a Thai actor, singer and model. He is best known for his roles in Love in Translation (2023), Century of Love (2024), and The Wicked Game (2025).

== Early life and education ==
Offroad was born in Hat Yai, Thailand on 4 February 2000. He studied at Hatyaiwittayalai School and later attended Srinakharinwirot University, graduating in 2022.

== Career ==
In March 2022, Offroad was introduced as an actor trainee under Atime26.

In September 2022, he was announced as a contestant on the One 31 survival show Laz Icon. During the program's finale, he placed second overall with 3,845,003 votes, earning a place in the boy group LAZ1.

In April 2022, he debuted with the group through the release of its debut digital single, "Taste Me".

In 2022, he made his television acting debut, appearing as himself in Rak Diao. In 2023, Offroad landed his first leading role in Love in Translation, starring alongside Pittaya Saechua (Daou). In 2024, he portrayed Vee in the series Century of Love.

The group disbanded in March 2023 following its farewell event, LAZ1 Goodbye Party "Once".

In October 2023, he made his solo debut with the single "Complete".

== Filmography ==
=== Film ===
Year	Title	Role	Notes	Ref.
2023	You & Me & Me	Toh	Guest role	

=== Television series ===
Year	Title	Role	Network	Notes	Ref.
2022	Our Days	Saint	AIS Play, One 31	Supporting role	
2022	One Love (Rak Diao)	Himself	One 31	Guest role (Ep. 8)	
2023	Love in Translation	Phumjai Rawichotpitak / "Pho Jo"	One 31	Main role	
2023	Across the Sky	Indie	One 31	Supporting role	
2024	Century of Love	Vee	One 31	Main role	
2025	The Wicked Game	Pheem	One 31	Main role	
2026	Girl from Nowhere: The Reset	Peck	OneD, Netflix	Main role (Ep. 2)	
2026	Muifei the Medium	Phum	TrueVisions	Main role	
2026	Juliet & Juliet	Himself	One 31	Cameo (Ep. 1)	
2027	Our Love Stories	TBA	One 31		
2027	Mon Merng Mang	Kan Fah	One 31	Main role	
2027	Mad Doctor	Doctor Luffy			

=== Television shows ===
Year	Title	Network	Notes	Ref.
2021	Laz Icon	One 31	Contestant	
2024	Thailand Music Countdown	Channel 3	Guest (Ep. 14)	
2026	Running Man Thailand	iQIYI Original	Guest (Ep. 5-7, 10)	
2026	House 31	One 31	Himself (Ep. 3-4)	

== Discography ==
=== Singles ===
==== As lead artist ====
Year	Title	Album	Label	Ref.
2023	"ง่ายๆ (Complete)"	Non-album single	One Music	
2025	"ผิดแผน (Foul)" (with Smew)	Non-album single	One Music	
2025	"แสร้ง (All Fake)"	Non-album single	One Music	
2025	"คับใจ(อยู่ได้) (Only You)"	Non-album single	One Music	
2026	"ฉันไม่รู้จักชื่อดอกไม้ (แต่จะหามาให้เธอ); I Don't Know the Names of Flowers (But I Will Find Them for You)"	Non-album single	One Music	

=== Soundtrack appearances ===
Year	Title	Album	Label	Ref.
2023	"You’re My First Love" (with Across The Sky Cast)	Across The Sky OST	One Music	
2023	รักไม่รู้ประสา (Unknown Love) (with Daou Pittaya)	Love In Translation OST	One Music	
2025	"คนไม่มีหัวใจ (Heartless)"	The Wicked Game OST	One Music	
2026	"แฟน (Content)"	Lost to Light OST	Ultimate Troop	

== Videography ==
=== Web series ===
Year	Title	Role	Publisher	Platform	Ref.
2023	OuRoad Close Friend	Himself	One Connection	YouTube	
2024	OuRoad Close Friend SS2	Himself	Open Label	YouTube	
2025	OuRoad Close Friend SS3	Himself	Open Label	YouTube	
2026	Ou-Road Close Friend Journey	Himself	One31, One Playground	YouTube	

=== Music video appearances ===
Year	Title	Artist	Album	Role	Label	Ref.
2024	"เจ็บก็สิอดเอา (Stay Strong)"	Mang	Non-album single	Male lead	LIT Entertainment	
2025	"เจ็บไม่จำ (Loop)"	Pex Zeal	The Wicked Game OST	Love interest	One Music	
2025	"เจ็บไม่จำ (Loop)"	Daou Pittaya	The Wicked Game OST	Love interest	One Music	

=== Live session collaborations ===
Year	Title	Artist collaborator(s)	Publisher	Platform	Ref.
2023	"ง่ายๆ (Complete)"	DJ Oung	One Music	YouTube	
2023	"ง่ายๆ (Complete)"	EarnEarn	One Music	YouTube	
2023	"ง่ายๆ (Complete)"	Laz Icon project group: Sirinat Srichonlatarn (First), Thanawat Shinawatra (Pluem), Jinnaphop Praditphakdee (Tangton), Peeratun Boonrod (Boon)	One Music	YouTube	
2025	"แสร้ง (All Fake)"	Jackie Jackrin, Jay (DICE)	One Music	YouTube	
2026	"คับใจ(อยู่ได้) (Only You)"	AA (BUS)	One Music	YouTube	
2026	"ฉันไม่รู้จักชื่อดอกไม้ (แต่จะหามาให้เธอ) I Don't Know the Names of Flowers (But I Will Find Them for You)"	Sarah Salola	One Music	YouTube	
2026	"อย่าฟังฉันร้อง (Let It Rain)"	Sarah Salola	LOVEiS Entertainment	YouTube	

== Awards and nominations ==
Award nominations for Kantapon Jindataweephol
Year	Award	Category	Nominee(s)	Result	Ref.
2024	Y Universe Awards	Best Screen Couple	Century of Love (with Pittaya Saechua)	Nominated	-
2024	Y Universe Awards	The Best Cuties		Nominated	-
2024	Y Universe Awards	Best Partner	with Pittaya Saechua	Won	-
2025	Bangkok Pride Awards	Most Popular Y Series Star		Nominated	-
2025	Maya TV Awards	Best BL Screen Couple (Popular Vote)	with Pittaya Saechua	Nominated	-
2025	Thailand Music Countdown	Spotify T-Pop Now Hottest of the Month	"All Fake" (แสร้ง)	Won	
2025	Howe Awards	Howe Rising Star Award		Won	-
2025	Howe Awards	Best Screen Couple	with Pittaya Saechua	Nominated	-
