= Century of Love =

2024 Thai television series

- Official series poster
- ปาฏิหาริย์รักร้อยปี (Thai)
- Genre: Drama; Romance; Fantasy
- Screenplay by: Chawanon Sarapat; Sorawich Pinyomit; Apirat Hinkaew
- Directed by: Worawit Khuttiyayothin; Thanawat Panyarin
- Starring: Pittaya Saechua; Kantapon Jindataweephol
- Opening theme: "Waiting To Say Those Words" by Karn of The Parkinson
- Country of origin: Thailand
- Original language: Thai
- No. of episodes: 10

Production
- Producers: Takonkiet Viravan; Nipon Pewnen
- Cinematography: Akkarawin Joknguluam
- Running time: 49–63 minutes

Original release
- Network: One 31; Netflix; GagaOOLala
- Release: 10 July – 8 August 2024

Century of Love (Thai: ปาฏิหาริย์รักร้อยปี; RTGS: Patihan Rak Roi Pi, lit. 'The Miracle of a Century's Love') is a 2024 Thai television series starring Pittaya Saechua (Daou) and Kantapon Jindataweephol (Offroad). Directed by Worawit Khuttiyayothin and Thanawat Panyarin, the romantic fantasy series was released on Wednesdays and Thursdays from 10 July to 8 August 2024, on Channel One 31, and globally on major OTT platforms such as Netflix and GagaOOLala.

== Synopsis ==
In 1920s Thailand, San (Pittaya Saechua), a Chinese immigrant, falls in love with Khun Wat (Yada Suwanpattana), the daughter of a Thai aristocrat. Their romance begins when she helps him recover after a severe injury, healing him with the "five-colored stone" at a temple dedicated to the goddess Nüwa. Tragically, as star-crossed lovers, Khun Wat dies. San attempts in vain to use the mystical stone's power to save her. The only way for them to be together again is for San to enter a century-long contract of immortality with Nüwa, agreeing to wait for Khun Wat to be reborn. The catch is that he will be tormented with pain every night; and if he fails to reunite with her, he will also face a tragic death for eternity. After searching for nearly 100 years, San meets Vee (Kantapon Jindataweephol), who is believed to be Khun Wat's reincarnation. Unexpectedly however, Vee is male.

== Cast and characters ==
=== Main ===
- Pittaya Saechua (Daou) as San
- Kantapon Jindataweephol (Offroad) as Vee

=== Supporting ===
- Yada Suwanpattana as Khun Wat/Watfah
- Ponlawit Ketprapakorn as Mom Chao Trai/Third
- Koravich Sarasin as Tao
- Pornsroung Rouyruen as Ju
- Jirawat Vachirasarunpatra as Chong
- Trungta Kositchaimongkol as Rat
- Natpongpon Suddee as Suchat
- Deuntem Salitul as Grandma Jam
- Parattakorn Kaiyanan as Ton
- Penpetch Benyakul as Mr. Chen

== Episodes ==
| No. | Original release date |
|---|---|
| 1 | 10 July 2024 |
Even though San doesn't believe that Vee is the person he's been searching for, several signs begin to make his heart waver.
| 2 | 11 July 2024 |
San takes Vee back to a place filled with past meanings, and he sees another side of Vee that others don't know.
| 3 | 17 July 2024 |
San is forced to propose to Vee, and Vee learns who San really is.
| 4 | 18 July 2024 |
Vee moves into San's house, as he begins to search for the five-color stone.
| 5 | 24 July 2024 |
With Vee's life in peril, San confronts the enigmatic foe behind their troubles and soon finds himself in a rivalry with a familiar face from his past.
| 6 | 25 July 2024 |
San and Vee begin to develop a stable relationship, but strange visions gradually appear to San.
| 7 | 31 July 2024 |
San questions his spiritual connection to Vee after meeting a woman who resembles a figure from his past. Later, the five-colored stone goes missing.
| 8 | 1 August 2024 |
San tries hard to win back Vee and they have to work together to get the five-color stone back.
| 9 | 7 August 2024 |
Vee is shot and San tries his best to save him, but his own health begins to deteriorate.
| 10 | 8 August 2024 |
With San's days numbered, Vee must find a way to save his beloved while still grieving.

== Awards and nominations ==
Name of the award ceremony, year presented, category, nominee of the award, and the result of the nomination
| Award ceremony | Year | Category | Nominee / Work | Result | Ref. |
|---|---|---|---|---|---|
| Y Universe Awards | 2024 | Outstanding Social Reflection in Television | Century of Love | Nominated | |
| Y Universe Awards | 2024 | Best Leading Actor | Pittaya Saechua (Daou) | Nominated | |
| Y Universe Awards | 2024 | Best Partner | Pittaya Saechua (Daou) and Kantapon Jindataweephol (Offroad) | Won | |
| Y Universe Awards | 2024 | Best Series Soundtrack | Karn of The Parkinson ("Waiting To Say Those Words") | Nominated | |
| Y Universe Awards | 2024 | The Best Y Series (Popular) | Century of Love | Nominated | |
| Y Universe Awards | 2024 | The Best BL Series (Popular) | Century of Love | Nominated | |
| Y Universe Awards | 2024 | The Best Leading Role (Popular) | Pittaya Saechua (Daou) | Nominated | |
| Y Universe Awards | 2024 | The Best Series OST (Popular) | Karn of The Parkinson ("Waiting To Say Those Words") | Nominated | |
| Y Universe Awards | 2024 | The Best Couple (Popular) | Pittaya Saechua (Daou) and Kantapon Jindataweephol (Offroad) | Nominated | |
| Y Universe Awards | 2024 | The Best Cuties (Popular) | Kantapon Jindataweephol (Offroad) | Nominated | |
| Y Universe Awards | 2024 | The Best Cuties (Popular) | Pittaya Saechua (Daou) | Nominated | |
| Y Universe Awards | 2024 | Y Iconic Star (Popular) | Pittaya Saechua (Daou) | Nominated | |

=== Listicles ===
Year-end lists for Century of Love
| Critic/Publication | List | Rank | Ref. |
|---|---|---|---|
| Soompi | 12 of the Best BL Dramas Released in 2024 | Included | |
| Teen Vogue | 13 Best BL Dramas of 2024 | Included | |
