= Kitsakorn Kanogtorn =

Thai actor and singer

Tongtong Kitsakorn Kanogtorn
- กฤษกร กนกธร
- Born: Wutthipat Opas-Iamkajorn; September 27, 1995 (age 31); Maha Sarakham, Thailand
- Other name: Tongtong
- Education: Bangkok University
- Occupations: Actor; Singer
- Years active: 2016–present

Tongtong Kitsakorn Kanogtorn (Thai: กฤษกร กนกธร; born Wutthipat Opas-Iamkajorn (Thai: วุฒิภัทร โอภาสตระกูล); 27 September 1995), known professionally as Tongtong (Thai: ตงตง), is a Thai actor and singer. He is best known for portraying Plai Ngam in Wanthong (2021), Yang in To Sir, with Love (2022), and Jet in The Wicked Game (2025). In 2026, he joined the main cast of the crime fantasy series NOUR, produced by WeTV.

== Early life and career ==
Tongtong Kitsakorn Kanogtorn was born on 27 September 1995 in Maha Sarakham Province, Thailand. Born as Wutthipat Opas-Iamkajorn, he later legally changed his name to Kitsakorn Kanogtorn. He graduated in Radio and Television Broadcasting from the Faculty of Communication Arts at Bangkok University.

In terms of extracurricular activities, during his high school years in 2011, tongtong participated in school activities such as performing arts, and in 2015 he was appointed as a BU Ambassador.

Tongtong entered the entertainment industry through the reality singing competition, The Star Season 12. Before the competition, tongtong had already done commercials while still in school and also filmed the series Lady Boy Friends The Series Tongtong made his acting debut in 2016 in the sitcom Bang Rak Soi 9/1, portraying Chatchaeng. He subsequently appeared in Sai Rak Sai Sawat, a role that brought him wider recognition. In 2019, he landed his first leading role as Anawin in Sao Noi Roi Lan View. In the following years, he continued appearing in productions for One31, starring in series and dramas including 4 The Elements, Sut Rak Saep Ili, Wanthong, To Sir, with Love, Khu Phra Khu Nang, and The Wicked Game.

In 2026, Tongtong was cast in his first BL series, NOUR, portraying Captain Ken / Kiran Amatanatee opposite actor Boss Patthakarn.

== Filmography ==
=== Television ===
Year	Title	Role	Notes	Network
2016–2018	Bang Rak Soi 9/1	Chatchaeng Trithipsiri (Chaeng)	Main role	One31
2018	Sai Rak Sai Sawat	Phubodi (Phu)	Supporting role	One31
2018	Mueang Maya Live; Sai Lueat Maya	Earth Athiwat Phuengnaichit	Main role	One31
2019	Sao Noi Roi Lan View	Anawin Chaiwatrungrueangkit	Main role	One31
2019	4 The Elements	Phee / Thep Pathapi	Main role	One31
2020	Sut Rak Saep Ili	Kirin Phiromphonkul	Main role	One31
2021	Wanthong	Plai Ngam / Chomuen Waiworanat	Main role	One31
2022	Khu Phai Huachai Su	Police Lieutenant Colonel Phetkla Saeng-amphon	Main role	One31
2022	My Sassy Princess: Snow White	Kiatphat (Phlu)	Supporting role	One31
2022	To Sir, with Love	Yang	Main role	One31
2024	Khu Phra Khu Nang	Din	Main role	One31
2025	The Wicked Game	Jet Yotsinpaisan	Main role	One31
2026	Ploi Nam Phet	Kla Tawan	Main role	One31
2026	Klin Mali	Muen Chaiboriban	Main role	One31
2026	NOUR	Captain Ken / Kiran Amatanatee	Main role	WeTV

== Awards and nominations ==
Year	Award	Category	Work	Result
2022	Maya Entertain Awards	Supporting Actor of the Year	Wanthong	Won
2024	Face of the Year Awards	Favorite Foreign Actor (Television Series)	Khu Phra Khu Nang	Won
