= Nour (Thai TV series) =

2026 Thai television series

- Official poster
- Thai: นูร์
- Genre: Crime; Fantasy; Romance; Boys' love
- Screenplay by: Boss Wasakorn Khumklaowiriya
- Directed by: Boss Wasakorn Khumklaowiriya
- Starring: Boss Patthakarn; Tongtong Kitsakorn Kanogtorn; Toey Pongsakorn Mettarikanon; Phoom Chawonwat Thongyoo
- Country of origin: Thailand
- Original language: Thai
- No. of seasons: 1

Original release
- Network: WeTV

NOUR (Thai: นูร์) is a 2026 Thai boys' love crime fantasy television series directed and written by Boss Wasakorn Khumklaowiriya. Produced by Tailai Entertainment for WeTV, the series stars Boss Patthakarn, Kitsakorn Kanogtorn (Tongtong), Pongsakorn Mettarikanon (Toey) and Chawonwat Thongyoo (Phoom).

It is scheduled to premiere on 25 August 2026 on WeTV. The release date was announced with the second official teaser released on 21 July 2026.

== Plot ==
A series of mysterious fires begins to spread across a city where unexplained supernatural events have long remained hidden. As rookie police officer James investigates the incidents, he finds himself working alongside Captain Ken, whose connection to the case appears to run deeper than anyone realizes.

Elsewhere, forensic doctor Jirat and his assistant Chita pursue clues that gradually uncover secrets linking the victims, the fires and a truth that blurs the boundary between life and death. As both investigations converge, the four men become entangled in a mystery that will change their lives forever.

== Cast and characters ==
=== Main ===
- Boss Patthakarn as James, a young police officer investigating a series of mysterious arson cases.
- Kitsakorn Kanogtorn (Tongtong) as Captain Ken, a mysterious military officer connected to the investigation.
- Pongsakorn Mettarikanon (Toey) as Jirat, a forensic doctor and Ken's close friend.
- Chawonwat Thongyoo (Phoom) as Chita, Jirat's assistant.
- Siravit Imsee (Little) as Rain
- Anton Krueger (Anton) as Panin

=== Supporting ===
- Peanut Peeranat Veeranipitkul as Peter
- Namnung Van De Ven as Pear

== Production ==
The project was announced as a WeTV Original series produced in collaboration with Tailai Entertainment. The production combines crime investigation with supernatural fantasy elements and marks the first Boys' Love leading roles for Tongtong Kitsakorn Kanogtorn and Toey Pongsakorn Mettarikanon.

Initially, the series was announced as AKINA on November 4, 2025, through a teaser titled Official Concept Teaser, as part of the WeTV Always More 2026 event. The teaser announced Boom (Raveewit Jirapongkanon) and Toey as the lead actors. On December 26, 2025, Phoom was announced as part of the cast.In March 2026, WeTV issued a statement announcing that Boom would no longer participate in the series. In May, WeTV announced that the project had been reworked and would be renamed Nour.

A blessing ceremony was held on 3 April 2026 at Union Mall in Bangkok. The event was attended by director Boss Wasakorn Khumklaowiriya, WeTV executives and the principal cast before principal photography began.

== Marketing ==
The first teaser trailer was released in May 2026, introducing the four lead characters and the series' blend of crime, fantasy and romance.

On 21 July 2026, WeTV released the second official teaser, confirming that the series would premiere on 25 August 2026.
