= Bang Rak Soi 9 =

- Genre: Sitcom
- Directed by: Phongsak Chimcharoen
- Starring: Saksit Tangtong; Phiyada Akkraseranee
- Opening theme: "It's word that love" (คือคำว่ารัก); Performed by Jack sukharom
- Country of origin: Thailand
- Original language: Thai
- No. of seasons: 9
- No. of episodes: 438

Production
- Executive producers: Takonkiat Veerawan; Saksit Tangtong; Jirasak Yochew; Suphakorn Liansuwan; Danai Amphorndanai
- Running time: 60 minutes
- Production company: The One Enterprise PLC.

Original release
- Network: Modernine TV
- Release: 5 April 2003 – 5 May 2012

Bang rak soi 9 (Thai: บางรักซอย 9; lit. 'the 9th soi of Bang Rak District') is a Thai sitcom that ran for eleven seasons between 2003 and 2012. The show was produced by The One Enterprise PLC., directed by Phongsak Chimcharoen and starring by Saksit Tangtong and Phiyada Akkraseranee. The show is about Chadjen, an architect who came to work in Bangkok and rented a house from Pang. It started with tumult of their houses, and relationship of Chadjen and Pang slowly grew. The show was first aired on 4 April 2003 until 5 May 2012. The show also became a stage-play of "Before Bang rak soi 9 on stage" (ก่อนจะถึง บางรักซอย 9 on stage). The last airing was on 5 May 2012 as "It has come to saturation point"

== Cast ==
- Saksit Tangthong as Chadjen Trithipsiri (Chadjen)
  An architect who came from Suphan Buri and rented a house from Pang
- Phiyada Akkraseranee as Aranya Thepsirikul (Pang)
  A tutor & cake shop owner, graduated from the Faculty of Education but sells cakes to make a living.
- Seenoom Chernyim (Buntham Huadkhathok) as Somphob Thepsirikul (A-Tu Uncle Tu)
  Father of Pang, a retired navy soldier. He likes hiding money but his wife always knows where it is hidden at. He is censured as 'parasite' of his wife (Don't appear since he was illness from Intracranial hemorrhage in 2008 and died in 2015)
- Pimkae Goonchorn Na Ayuthaya as Nongyao Thepsirikul (Na yao Auntie Yao)
  Mother of Pang, daughter of nobleman family 'Benmariwong', she was in love with Uncle Tu, but her cousin doesn't like him, especially her older sister, lady Chan (or lady-aunt Chan), who was hurt by a soldier.
- Pongphan Petchbuntoon as Soraphong Thepsirikul (Pick)
  Younger brother of Pang. When he was a high school student, he always dressed up like a lunatic as his own style, but after he moved to alley 9, he becomes a teenager who loves modern music, especially hip-hop.
- Luerfuer Mokjok as Maruay Meesup (Maruay/Ruay)
  Friend of Chadjen, from Udon Thani, he was in love with Lamduan
- Tee Doksadao as Phornthep Chuto (Man)
  Friend of Chanjen, a playboy who has a son. He loves his son very much. He was divorced after an affair. His son was still very young upon his divorce. He was put his son with Uncle Tu and Auntie Yao.
- Somjet Payakso as Somjet Meejettana (Here-Mu Brother Mu)
  Owner of street restaurant & grocery, single man who is eagerly looking for his truelove.
- Pasakorn Chimcharoen as Kuayjeng Chuto (Jeng)
  Son of Man, his mother was trying to take him to Singapore.
- Tatphong Phongtat as Manop Maphob (Pas, Passie)
  Gay older friend of Pang, he likes to josh with Man and other handsome men
- Joke Chernyim as Boonrak Boonmee
  Ex-Security of ex-office of Chadjen, currently a motorcycle rider
- Oonruen Rachot as Lamduan Homhuan
  Maid of Pang's house, from Nong Khai, he is in love with Maruay
