= Patiparn Patavekarn =

Thai actor and pop singer (born 1973)

- ปฏิภาณ ปฐวีกานต์
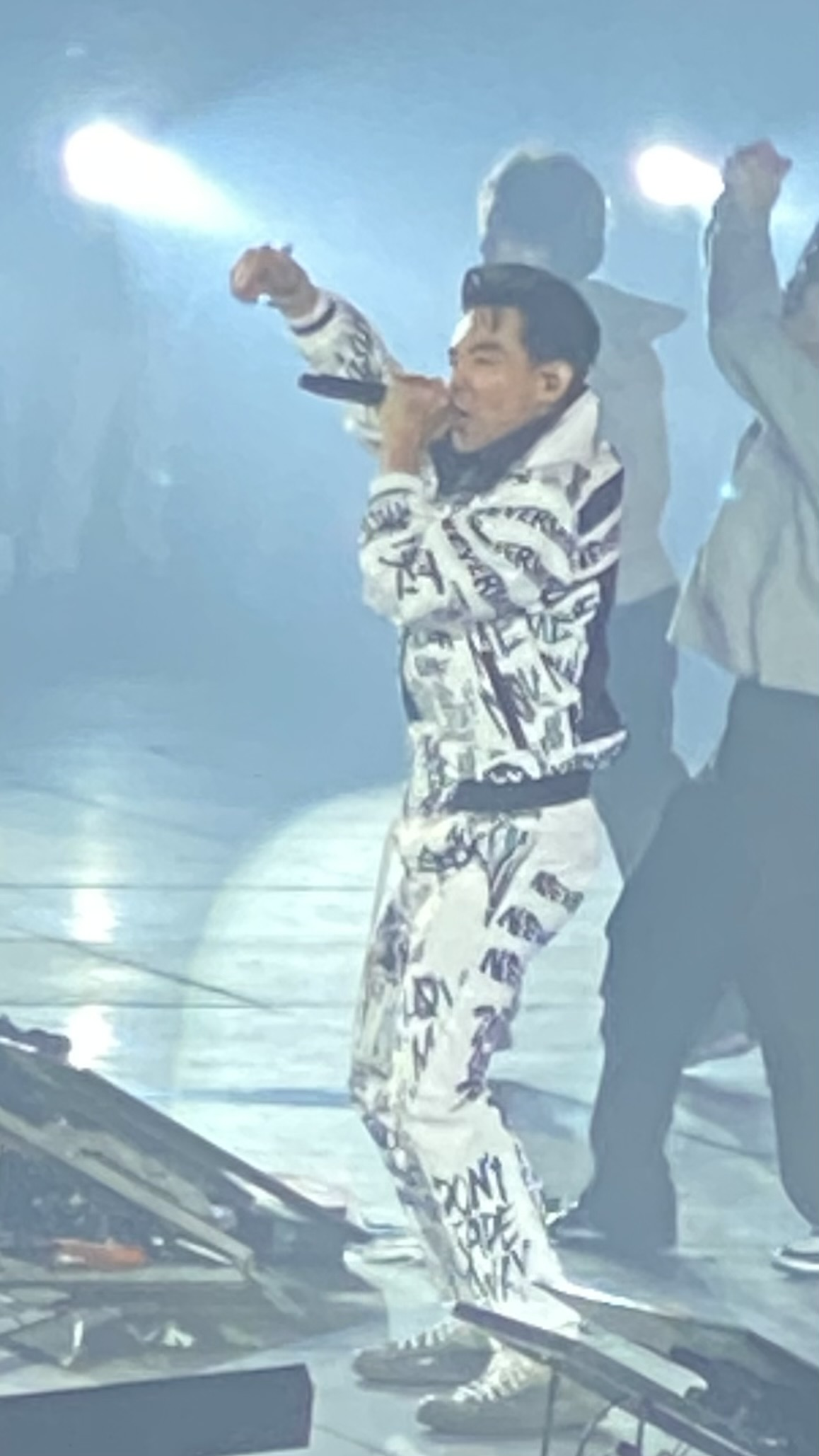
- Patiparn in 2023
- Born: Sathit Tangsophon; March 23, 1973 (age 53); Dusit, Bangkok, Thailand
- Other names: Mos; Mos Patiparn
- Occupations: Singer; actor
- Years active: 1990–present
- Agent: GMM Grammy

Patiparn Patavekarn (Thai: ปฏิภาณ ปฐวีกานต์, RTGS: Patiphan Pathawikan; also Mos Patiparn or Mos, born March 23, 1973), is a Thai film and television actor and pop singer from GMM Grammy. He released his debut album in 1992 and is known for his melodic ballads.

== Biography ==
Mos debuted at 16 as a model for a magazine by Poj Anon in 1990, but has become mainly known as an actor and a singer. He became the rising star when he played as "Peerapol" in the high-rating 3 Num 3 Mum sitcom (EXACT, GMM Grammy) together with Songsit Roongnophakunsri (Kob) and Saksit Tangtong (Tang) in 1991. A year later, he released his debut album, "Ur Hur". Mos' second album, "Mr. Mos" became his most successful album ever with the sale amount of 1.5 million copies. So far, he's released 8 albums (with another 10 special albums). He starred in Exact's musical for the first time in "Bangkok 2485". Afterthat, Mos did several dramas including the acclaimed "Hua Jai Chocolate", "Duay Rang Hang Ruk", "Ubattihet Hua Jai", etc. Latest he's been honourly given the leading role in "Fah Jarod Sai-The Musical". Now Mos plays the police officer in Exact-Scenario's new sitcom called "Poo Kong Jao Sa-nae", and he's also hosting the 3 Num 3 Mum Variety Show with Kob and Tang.

== Filmography ==
=== Movies ===
Movies
Year	Title	Role	Notes
1991	Kling Wai Gaun Por Sorn Wai	N/A	Lead Role
1992	Sa Daew Haew	Haew	Lead Role
1993	Pee Nung Puen Gun Lae Wan Assajan Kaung Pom	N/A	Lead Role
1994	Ban Tuek Jak Look Poochai	N/A	Lead Role
1997	Jakrayan See Daeng	N/A	Lead Role
2011	Mue Prab Poon Taek	Piak	Lead Role

=== Television ===
Television
Year	Title	Role	Network	Notes	With
1998	Poo Chai Hua Jai Mai Pae	N/A	TV5	Lead Role	Phiyada Akarasenee
2001	Khon 2 Khom	N/A	TV5	Lead Role	Katreeya English
2002	Jao Chai Hua Jai Gern Roy	Vakim	Channel 7	Lead Role	Chiranan Manochaem
2003	Rak Harm Promote	N/A	ITV	Lead Role	Pimmada Boriruksuppakorn
2004	Rak Kern Pikad Kaen	N/A	Channel 7	Lead Role	Suvanat Kongying
2005	Hua Jai Chocolate	Chun	TV5	Lead Role	Piyada Akarasenee
2006	Duay Rang Hang Ruk	Sirapat	Channel 7	Lead Role	Voranuch Vongsavan
2007	Ubattihet Hua Jai	N/A	TV5	Lead Role	Pimmada Boriruksuppakorn
2007	Poo Gaung Jao Sa Nae	Mana	Channel 3	Lead Role	Akumsiri Suwannasuk
2007	Saeng Dao Hang Hua Jai	N/A	Channel 7	Lead Role	Araya A. Hargate
2008	Kwarm Lub Kaung Superstar	Gun	TV5	Lead Role	Aticha Pongsilpipat
2009	Sakul Ga	Pongsakorn Thepborirak/Nong	TV5	Lead Role	Wannarot Sontichai
2010	Hua Jai Ploy Jone	Vorapat	TV5	Lead Role	Pimmada Boriruksuppaporn
2012	Nang Singh Sabad Chor	Policeman Thummo	TV5	Lead Role-upcoming	Ornjira Larmvilai

=== Variety shows ===
- 2007.04 3 Num 3 Mum Variety, TV9
- 2008.01 3 Num 3 Mum Tonight, TV5

=== Musicals ===
- 2004 Bangkok 2485 The Musical (บางกอก 2485 เดอะมิวสิคัล)
- 2007 Fah Jarod Sai The Musical (ฟ้าจรดทราย เดอะมิวสิคัล)
- 2009 Lom Hai Jai The Musical (ลมหายใจ เดอะมิวสิคัล)

== Discography ==
=== Albums ===
- 1992 Mos Ur Hur
- 1994 Mr. Mos – Mai Ruk Mai Dai Laew
- 1995 Moving Mos
- 1997 Mos Maew Moo
- 1998 Patiparn Party
- 2001 Mr. Mos Happy Trip ... Salad Sabut
- 2002 Mos Special 11 * Celebration of 11th year career
- 2005 Mos Patiparn
- 2008 9 Mos (Nine Mos)

=== Special albums ===
- 1995 Tee Wang Kaung Tur * various artists collaboration
- 1995 6-2-12 * various artists collaboration
- 1997 MOS＆TATA * collaboration with Tata Young
- 2001 CHEER * various artists collaboration
- 2001 MOSKAT * collaboration with Katreeya English
- 2003 A:LIVE PROJECT01/PROJECT 02
- 2003 Ruk Harm Promote Drama Original Soundtrack * co-release with Pim of Zaza
- 2004 Bangkok 2485 The Musical (Vol. 1 Cast Recording & Vol. 2 Original Songs)
- 2004 Ruk Kern Pikad Kaen Drama Original Soundtrack
- 2006 Narongvit Sleepless Society vol. 2 *various artists
- 2007 Fah Jarod Sai The Musical Original Cast Recording
- 2007 MOS-ICE-PECK "15 Films" *MV compilation DVD, released in Japan
- 2007 Hua Jai Sila Drama Original Soundtrack * various artists including Mos' "Poo Gaung Jow Sa Nay" OST.
- 2008 Pleng Hot Lakorn Hit Vol. 2 * various artists including Mos' "Sang Dao Hang Hua Jai" and "Ruk Dai Tae Ruk".

=== Singles ===
- 1997 "Ting Gun Dai Ngai/Piang Puen" – MOS＆TATA * collaboration with Tata Young
- 1997 "Happy Birthday" – MOS, TATA & NAT * collaboration with Tata Young & Nat Myria Benedetti
- 2011 "Kang Thoe Samoe"
- 2013 "Toem Fan" * collaboration with Nicole Theriault
- 2019 "Phro Thoe Saen Di"
- 2023 "Romantic Syndrome"
- 2024 "Love You Too Na" * collaboration with Snow (Mos's daughter)
- 2024 "Lao Ma Si" * collaboration with Lamyai HaiThongkam

=== Compilation albums ===
- 1996 Double Hits – MOS & AOM (Tied with Aom Sunisa's hits)
- 1996 HAPPY MOS (Black-covered Hit Compilation)
- 1999 Mos Patiparn Pataweekarn Karaoke Compilation
- 2000 THE VERY BEST OF MOS * during studying abroad in LA
- 2003 The Best Selected
- 2006 Be My Mos
- 2011 Best of MOS
- 2015 FOREVER LOVE HITS by MOS PATIPARN
- 2024 GRAMMY RS Best Hits: MOS X TAO (Tied with Tao Somchai’s hits)

=== Concert VCDs ===
- 1994 Mos Peeraga Wara Valentine
- 1994 Mr. Mos Sensurround Concert
- 1994 Mr. Mos Eek Suk Tee Gub U.H.T Kaw Dee Na Puen Concert
- 1995 Moving Mos – Move Neu Make Concert
- 1995 Mos in the Drawing Room – Guess Who's Moving
- 1995 6-2-12 Concert
- 1997 Mos-Tata & Friends Concert
- 2001 CHEER Greet Toom Boom Concert
- 2002 10th Anniversary Mos Concert – Mai Ruk ... Kaw Bah Laew
- 2002 Mahagum Concert (Vol.1 Pop Grammy)
- 2002 EXACT 10th Anniversary Concert
- 2002 J Jetrin – Bangkok Show The Return of J Jetrin (Mos as guest)
- 2003 Pattaya Music Festival 2003 (Vol. 1 Pop Rock)
- 2003 Thailand IP Festival 2003 Highlight (Vol. 1)
- 2007 Sleepless Society vol. 2 Concert
- 2008 3 Num 3 Mic Concert 2008
- 2009 U.S.A Tour "Mos Wanted Live Concert"

== Commercials ==
- [1990] LOLLY Candy (Pre-debut)
- [1990] SUGUS Candy (Pre-debut)
- [1990] FARM HOUSE Bread (Pre-debut)
- [1990] LOTTE Chewing Gum (Pre-debut)
- [1990] Coffee - (aired in Indonesia) (Pre-debut)
- [1992] COCA Instant Noodle
- [1993] Coca-Cola (Coke)
- [1995] DUTCH MILL Milk
- [1997] YAMAHA Motorcycle : Tiara Model
- [1998] LAYS Potato chips
- [2001] LOTTE NO TIME Gum
- [2002] DTAC Mobile Phone Network
- [2002] M150 Energy Drink
- [2008] ISUZU DMAX Hi-Lander Gold Series
- [2008] ISUZU DMAX Hi-Lander Platinum Series
- [2011] Chevrolet Captiva
- [2012] Chang Drinking Water
- [2023] Ocha Seasoning Powder
