= Dice (Thai band) =

Thai boy band

DICE
- Origin: Bangkok, Thailand
- Genre: T-pop • pop • hip hop
- Years active: 2024–present
- Label: Sonray Music (2024–present)
- Spinoffs: DICERED • DICEBLUE
- Members: Jay; Min; Alex; Apo; Jisang; Obo; Cheese; Maddoc; Otto; Frame

DICE (Thai: ไดซ์) is a Thai boy band formed by Sonray Music, a subsidiary of Tada Entertainment. The group consists of ten members: Jay, Min, Alex, Apo, Jisang, Obo, Cheese, Maddoc, Otto, and Frame. The members were former trainees under the 789TRAINEE program who participated in the reality survival show 789 Survival.

== History ==
Following the debut of the boy group BUS, Sonray Music introduced the remaining ten trainees from the 789 SURVIVAL project as a new boy group. On March 11, 2024, the agency officially launched social media channels for the group under the name DICE.

The ten-member lineup was officially introduced as Sonray Music's second boy group on March 14, 2024. The group debuted with the release of their single "Mona Lisa" in March 2024.

== Members ==
DICE consists of ten members:

Full name	Stage name	Nationality	Position	Date of birth	Sub-unit
Karnsophon Wiroonnitipon	Jay	Thailand	Leader	July 23, 2004 (age 22)	DICEBLUE
Thanakrit Yingwattanakul	Min	Thailand	Member	May 9, 2001 (age 25)	DICERED
Alexander Buckland	Alex	Thailand	Member	August 24, 2003 (age 23)	DICEBLUE
Wachirakon Raksasuwan	Apo	Thailand	Member	January 18, 2005 (age 21)	DICERED
Akira Kim	Jisang	South Korea	Member	October 3, 2005 (age 21)	DICEBLUE
Apinat Piamkulvanich	Obo	Thailand	Member	November 17, 2005 (age 21)	DICEBLUE
Chayapol Khiaowiam	Cheese	Thailand	Member	May 15, 2006 (age 20)	DICEBLUE
Maddoc Rees Davies	Maddoc	Thailand	Member	November 28, 2006 (age 19)	DICERED
Sippawitch Pongwachirin	Otto	Thailand	Member	June 21, 2007 (age 19)	DICERED
Thanannat Sittiphanthakul	Frame	Thailand	Member	December 21, 2008 (age 17)	DICERED

== Sub-units ==
Unit	Members
DICEBLUE	Jay, Alex, Jisang, Obo, Cheese
DICERED	Min, Apo, Maddoc, Otto, Frame

== Discography ==
=== Singles ===
Year	Title	Album / Notes	Ref.
2024	"Mona Lisa"	Debut single	
2024	"Hey! I Like You" (โคตรชอบเลยอ่ะ)	Non-album single	
2024	"TRAP U"	Non-album single	
2024	"YES MAN"	Non-album single	
2024	"Comeback No Comeback" (พูดไม่ถึง)	Non-album single	
2025	"BANG"	Non-album single	
2025	"Why?" (ยิ่งคบยิ่งไม่รัก)	Non-album single	
2025	"y(our) song"	Non-album single	
2025	"BILLIONAIRE"	Non-album single	
2026	"SWIPE UP"	Non-album single	
2026	"Just a Heartbreak" (แค่อกยังไม่เท่าไหร่)	Non-album single	
2026	"SEASON"	Non-album single	
2026	"SO DERN" (โซ๊ะ เดิ้น)	Non-album single	
2026	"smoke" (ลองกอด)	Non-album single	
2026	"POSSIBILITIES"	Non-album single	
2026	"Lock Fao" (ล็อคเป้า)	Non-album single	

== Filmography ==
=== Television series ===
Year	Title	Member	Role / Notes	Ref.
2019	Great Men Academy	Alex	Guest role	

=== Variety shows ===
Year	Title	Role	Network / Platform	Notes
2023	789 SURVIVAL	Contestants	One 31 / YouTube	Survival show
2024	DICE Debut Diary	Main cast	YouTube	Official web series
2025	DICE UP TO YOU	Main cast	YouTube	Official web series
2026	DICE MISSION ROLL	Main cast	YouTube	Official web series

== Concerts and tours ==
=== Headlining concerts ===
Year	Title	Date	Venue
2024	DICE 1st Debut Showcase	March 26, 2024	True Icon Hall, Bangkok
2025	DICE 1st Mini Album Showcase & Concert	September 13, 2025	Samyan Mitrtown Hall, Bangkok
2026	DICE 1st Concert : THE FIRST ROLL	June 27–28, 2026	Thunder Dome, Muang Thong Thani

=== Fan concert tours ===
Year	Title	City	Date	Venue
2026	DICE 1st Thailand Fancon : Roll the Dice	Bangkok	October 10, 2026	Chaengwattana Hall, Central Chaengwattana

=== Concert participation ===
Year	Title	Members	Date	Venue
2023	789 SPECIAL STAGE THE TIME CAPSULE	Trainees	September 22–24, 2023	Thunder Dome
2024	T-POP Concert Fest 2	All	November 9–10, 2024	Queen Sirikit National Convention Center
2025	T-POP Concert Fest 3	All	November 8–9, 2025	Queen Sirikit National Convention Center
2026	Thai-J Pop Music Festival 2026	All	February 28, 2026	centralwOrld

== Awards and nominations ==
Year	Award	Category	Nominated work	Result	Ref.
2024	12th Thailand Social Awards	Best Creator Performance on Social Media (Boy Band & Girl Group)	DICE	Won	
2024	T-Pop Of The Year	Best Newcomer	"Mona Lisa"	Nominated	
2025	TOTY Music Awards 2024	New Artist of the Year	DICE	Nominated	
2025	Kazz Awards 2025	Trending Artist Award	DICE	Won	
2025	The Guitar Mag Awards 2025	New Wave of the Year	DICE	Won	
2025	The Guitar Mag Awards 2025	Popular Vote	DICE	Nominated	
2025	The Guitar Mag Awards 2025	Best Boy Group of the Year	DICE	Nominated	
2026	14th Thailand Social Awards	Best Entertainment Figures Performance on Social Media (Boy Band)	DICE	Won	
2026	TOTY Music Awards 2025	Most Popular Male Group Of The Year	"SWIPE UP"	Nominated	
2026	The Viral Hits Love Moment Awards 2026	Popular Group Artist of the Year	DICE	Won	
2026	FEED x KHAOSOD AWARDS 2026	Popular Artist Award	DICE	Nominated	
