= Pixxie =

Thai girl group

PiXXiE
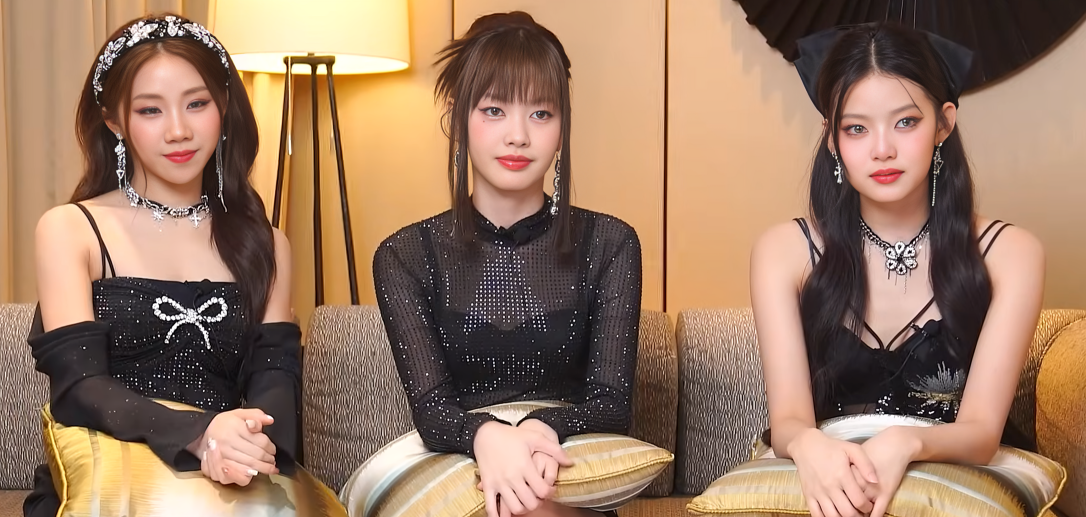
- PiXXiE in November 2023; From left to right: Ingkho, Pimma, and Mabelz

Background information
- Origin: Bangkok, Thailand
- Genre: T-pop
- Years active: 2021–present
- Label: LIT Entertainment
- Members: Mabelz; Pimma; Ingkho

Pixxie (Thai: พิกซี่, stylized as PiXXiE), is a Thai girl group formed by LIT Entertainment. The group consists of three members: Mabelz, Pimma, and Ingkho. The group officially debuted on February 11, 2021 with the single "Ded".

== History ==
On February 11, 2021, LIT Entertainment announced the debut of Pixxie, consisting of members Suchada Sonphan (Mabelz), Pimmada Chaisaksoen (Pimma), and Inpalee Chotiruntananon (Ingkho) with the single "Ded (เด็ด)".

The group's name derives from the pixie, a type of fairy in English mythology, known to cause mischief in flower gardens, and whose names coincide with the Thai characters in the names of its three members. The addition of the double x 'XX' represents the symbol of the chromosome which identifies the female sex.

On October 4, 2021, the group released its second single titled "Mutelu (มูเตลู)". In December of the same year, it participated in the special album of LIT Entertainment with its own version of the song "My Present" by Pat Vorapat.

In February 2022, they participated with the song "Heal Jai" in a new special collaborative album by LIT Entertainment, while in April, they released their third digital single titled "Too Cute (เกินต้าน)." In September of the same year, PiXXie released their first studio album titled Bloom, which contained ten tracks, including their lead single titled "Not Bad", in addition to all of their previously released digital singles. At the end of that same year they released the single "Hot Dangerous" in collaboration with the company Infinix Mobile for their Hot 20 smartphone.

On March 1, 2023, they had a second collaboration, this time with the Bioré brand for their product Biore Acne Cleansing Buddy, with the song "Chin Up." A month later they participated in a new collaborative album by LIT Entertainment with the single "Samchamhatnuk" and released their fourth digital single titled "FYI (ชอบอยู่ รู้ยัง)."

Pixxie released the digital single "Dejayou" on July 17, 2023, which was later included alongside "FYI" and the a new title track, "Way Too Cute (ชอบไปหมด)", on their first mini album, rain, released on December 7, 2023.

On May 7, 2024, Pixxie released the digital single "FEAT."

== Members ==
- Suchada Sonphan (Mabelz)
- Pimmada Jaisaksern (Pimma)
- Intapalee Chotihiranthanon (Ingkho)

== Discography ==
=== Studio albums ===
- 2022: Bloom

=== Mini albums ===
- 2023: rain

=== Singles ===
Year	Title	Album
2021	"Ded"	s/a
2021	"Mutelu"	s/a
2022	"Too Cute"	s/a
2022	"Not Bad"	
2022	"HOT Dangerous"	Bloom
2022	"Boo"	
2022	"Whatever"	
2023	"Chin Up"	s/a
2023	"FYI"	rain
2023	"Dejayou"	rain
2023	"CALLING YOU"	
2024	"FEAT"	s/a

== Awards and nominations ==
Year	Award	Category	Nominee	Result	Ref.
2021	TOTY Music Awards	New Artist of the Year	PiXXie	Nominated	
2022	KAZZ Awards	Rising Star	PiXXie	Won	
