= Pen Tor =

Thai television sitcom

Pen Tor (Thai: เป็นต่อ) is a Thai situation comedy television program written and created by Takolkiat Weerawan, Kitti Cheawwongkul, Pruak Amaruji, Supakorn Rheansuwan and Jirasuk YoJiw. Pen Tor was first broadcast on every Thursday on Thai Channel 3. The pilot was first aired on 7 October 2004.

Pen Tor is about modern working singles who are looking for partners. It is centered on a Mr. Pentor, who is a businessman in the BKL company. He wants to have an easy life and just wants to be a normal businessman like other people in Bangkok.

== Characters ==
=== Main ===
- Pentor is a charismatic man working as a sales staff at BKL (Bangkok Life) magazine. After a break-up, he is single, but knows who the love of his life is and is, in addition to wooing around, also trying to win her back. He is usually the voice of reason and, being the most financially stable, the main patron in the quartet of BKL men especially when it comes to paying for food and nightlife. Pentor is shown to have good pronunciation of English.
- Porjai is Pentor's younger sister who lives with him at his two-bedroom apartment. She usually is short-tempered and can be regarded as paranoid. She cares a lot about her brother and his ex-girlfriend, usually saying that Thip is the only woman she will ever accept as a sister-in-law.
- Thipayawan (Thip) is Pentor's ex-girlfriend. Although they went through a break-up, she is still on good terms with the rest of the characters. She is a devout practitioner of Buddhism and would practically never lie, despite being surrounded by people who trick and backstab each other all the time. As Karma would have it, Thip rarely, if ever, ends up on the wrong side of the stick. Thip generally does not start her own mischief, or even say a white lie, unless it is required to teach someone a lesson. When she does so, she begs "the grace of Buddha" for forgiveness, and her plans can be surprisingly effective. She is usually aware of Pentor's plans and still has feelings for him, but is afraid to resume the relationship.
- Kanthep is Porjai's current boyfriend (as of Season 2018). He sometimes participates in Pentor's antics, and their relationship is usually on a "lion and tiger" basis, meaning that they equally respect each other in terms of their man skills.

=== BKL ===
- Wisetniyom (Yom), played by (pseudonymous) Jeab Chern-Yim, (Note: In Thailand, it is common for comedy actors to be known only by a nickname and his troupe name.) hails from Phitsanulok Province and works as the art director at BKL. He is always on the lookout for entertainment and nightlife, to the point that he frequently resorts to mischievously obtaining money from his colleagues to fuel his urges. He has an imaginary friend named Sakhrin to whom he attributes all his wrongdoings and mischief. (Note: Sakhrin's name is a reference to a Likay actor based in Phitsanulok, famous for his villain roles. https://pantip.com/topic/33094963. Sakhrin in Pen Tor is just Yom's imagination, not related to the Likay star.) He has an on-and-off relationship with Mint, who runs Bangbar with him as co-owners. His evil plans are usually concocted by consulting Sakhrin, but they usually backfire. For example, he once implored the others to praise him as "Wisetniyom the Savior of BKL" bragging his leads to a five-million baht deal, only to discover that it was a ploy directed against Pentor and the deal never took place. He is usually teased about his father being behind bars. Despite his frequent failures, his plans are usually the most complicated and skillfully designed. In addition to friends at BKL and Pentor's connections, Yom seems to have other connections in the underworld.
- Wok, portrayed by Gitti Chiawwongkul, is a young proofreader at BKL, the youngest of the BKL quartet. He used to date Chompoo, but broke up after a string of distrust. He owns a big bike and it is a big part of his lifestyle. He is usually cowardly and would find every single way to get out of fights. He is extremely afraid of ghosts and would even avoid uttering the word itself, using "suki" in its stead.
- Ood, portrayed by (pseudonymous) Ood Pentor, (Note: Pen Tor is Ood's debut television work. His role and the sitcom's name became his de facto stage name.) is the columnist at BKL and the oldest of the boys. He is into alternative music and lifestyle. His obese wife usually torments him and is the cause of his crisis. He is also constantly worried about his two children. He used to hang out with the Dwarf Association until they banned his gang. He refers to himself as a "gray man", which indicates that he is merely following along with Yom and Wok's plans. That excuse usually can't exclude him from his responsibilities, though.
- Samon (Mhon) is the boss of them all, but is never above the shenanigans of the rest of the office. She expresses her fondness for younger boys and gives them the tough love. She is the main voice of reason for BKL, but is not above screaming and yelling at her subordinates, when they are acting like little boys themselves.
- Julia, a half-Brazilian, is a new online sales staff at BKL. She lives in the same apartment building as Pentor, and they met on bad terms after she called the police on the boys' loud party. She developed friendship with the boys after a scuffle at Bangbar, where she led the offensive against a group of employees from a rival company.
- Nipon is a high-level executive of BKL. He is off-screen, but sometimes extends the baton on Mhon and her staff and influences BKL policies and plans.

=== Bangbar ===
- Mint operates Bangbar, the local pub & restaurant located 100 meters from BKL office. (Note: S2019E32) She used to date Yom. Despite the break-up, Yom still owns part of the share in the place. They are still friends with benefits when she's drunk, to the point that she would always interject Yom's advances that she would never drink with him again, usually only to fail and wake up naked next to him. At some point, Mint developed her own guardian angel, "Sakh-lilly," the female version of Sakhrin.
- Juab works as the chief of waitstaff at the restaurant. He usually handles the floor while Mint and Yom are not available. He has a cheesy demeanor towards the co-owners, but is otherwise competent.

=== Supporting characters ===
==== Family Members ====
Some family members rarely appear on screen, but are frequently mentioned.

- Torpong is Pentor and Porjai's father. He rarely appears in the set and Porjai frequently expresses her longing to see her father again. He is a mischievous and tricky man, a gene that clearly reflected in Pentor.
- Truengjai is Torpong's ex-wife who lives in the US. She rarely visits her children.
- Klum and his unnamed wife are Wok's parents. Wok's friends at BKL usually tease about Klum being feminine, which is not true.
- Yim and his unnamed wife are Yom's parents. In the same vein, people usually joke about Yim being behind bars.
- Uncle Ngiam is Mint's uncle-in-law who appeared in early seasons. He usually comes to Bangbar as an extra pair of hands. He usually causes other problems of his own.
- Looknam, usually called Changnam (lit. "Water Elephant"), is Ood's obese wife who usually torments him. For the sake of her family, she seeks to moderate Ood's lifestyle and behavior, getting angry when she catches him out drinking, going to nightclubs, or overspending.

==== Other characters ====
- Golf is a kathoey (male with female behavior) housekeeper at Pentor and Porjai's apartment. She is usually involved with her friends and often gets into trouble with "kathoey stuff" (brawls, jealousy, debts, etc.) and also often needs someone to bail out for her.
- Lai works at the minimart on the first floor of Pentor's apartment complex. The place almost went bankrupt during the original season, but Pentor and Porjai purchased the business to keep him employed. The minimart has become an extension to their home since, with the cast frequently hanging out. In addition to sofa and eating space, it also has computers available for an hourly rate. In season 2020, the minimart also operates a small food pantry in response to COVID-19.
- Berm is a security guard for the apartment complex. He struggles to earn his stripes and advance in his career.
- Mor Mha (lit. "Fortuneteller Dog") once made a series of (negative) divinations on various members of the cast. The fallout of his divinations affected the cast for a while.
- Yos is a Police Captain (OF-3) at the local department. He is known by the BKL quartet and rarely appears.
- Sakhrin and Sakh-lilly are Yom and Mint's "guardian angels," or more like imaginary friends. In the more recent seasons, it appears that anyone can summon them (males to Sakhrin, and females to Sakh-lilly) for advice. There is no clear criteria for summoning them. Yom is known to especially act out talking to Sakhrin in extended conversations, where he shifts around to imitate actually talking to Sakhrin, causing people around him to question his sanity. When these guardians are active, the characters speak in a more aggressive tone and end each sentences with "hey, hey, hey!" Despite not actually existing in the show, they play a lot of roles in explaining the thought processes of many characters concocting their ploys on many occasions.

==== Previous Love Interests ====
- Nu is Porjai's ex-boyfriend who had prominent role in earlier parts.
- Kaopad used to have a crush on Pentor, but her love was not reciprocated.
- Bank pretended to love Golf for a while and serially swindled her money.
- Mr. Manop used to date Mhon for a while, before ghosting her after Mor Mha divined that he has a "wife-killing curse."
- Joe is dating Mhon. He is in his early 20s, shown to be conscripted for a few episodes.
- Chompoo studied at the same place as Wok. She quickly married after dumping him for the final time following a rocky relationship.
- Prang is Wok's newest relationship as of 2020. She is a pharmacist who behaves with extreme politeness, but does not hesitate to grab Wok's head and cuss at him, should he misbehave.
- Mr. Big used to be with Mint, who uses him to antagonize Yom, after a drunken night inadvertently assisted by Yom's drugging.
