= The One Enterprise =

Television and radio production company

- Company type: Public
- Traded as: SET: ONEE
- ISIN: THA504010002
- Industry: Media and publications
- Predecessor: Exact; Scenario
- Founded: November 27, 1991; 34 years ago (as Exact Co.Ltd.)
- Headquarters: 50 GMM Grammy Place, Asoke Montri Road, Khlong Toei Nuea subdistrict, Watthana District Bangkok Thailand
- Owner: GMM Grammy (35.09%)

The One Enterprise Public Company Limited (Thai: เดอะ วัน เอ็นเตอร์ไพรส์) was a public limited company under GMM Grammy Public Company Limited. It is a holding company that engages in integrated entertainment media business. It is a content creation through the production of various types of programs covering all target audiences and owns content distribution channels covering both online and offline, including event organization, outsourcing, content licensing to foreign countries and related businesses such as studio rental services, artist management and merchandising. It is a joint venture and flagship company for digital TV and FM radio content production of GMM Grammy, extending the business from Exact Company Limited and Scenario Company Limited. The highest executive is Takonkiet Viravan as Group Chief Executive Officer. One31 Company Limited, a licensed high-definition digital terrestrial television operator under the name Channel One 31, is a subsidiary that conducts the core business.

The One Enterprise has evolved from Takonkiet's role as a drama director for Master Plan Co., Ltd. (now A-Time Media), a subsidiary of Grammy, since March 1990 before separating to form Exact in 1991 it was established under the same umbrella to produce content for broadcast on various television channels before being acquired by GMM Media in 2002. Then, Takonkiet founded Scenario in 2004 and is the largest shareholder with more than half of all shares. It is a joint venture of GMM Media to expand the business into concert organizing and stage plays, with its own theater, Muang Thai Rachadalai Theater, which is a joint venture with Muang Thai Life Assurance.

Then in 2013 GMM Grammy established The One Enterprise Co., Ltd. as a subsidiary, holding 100% of the shares, and allowing The One Enterprise to hold 100% of the shares in One31 Co., Ltd., which GMM Grammy submitted to bid for high-definition digital terrestrial television and received the license under the name of Channel One 31 in March 2015 Takonkiet and his group acquired a 49% stake in The One Enterprise, consolidating the television operations from Exact and Scenario for management convenience, and acquiring additional shares in other companies, such as Exact Scenario, Meemiti, and ACTS Studio, as subsidiaries. Then in the first half of 2017 the registered capital was doubled by Pramaporn Prasatthong-Osot in the name of Prananthaporn Co., Ltd.

Later on November 30, 2020 The One Enterprise has acquired common shares of GMM Channel Holding, which comprises subsidiaries GMMTV, Change2561, GMM Media (including A-Time Media), and GMM Studios International, to expand its audience base in other target groups and enhance collaboration within the group. The company has been appointed as the marketing agent for GMM 25 to clearly position its content across each distribution channel. Then on March 10, 2021 the Board of Directors of GMM Grammy has approved the conversion of The One Enterprise into a public limited company under the name The One Enterprise Public Company Limited on May 3, 2021 to crowdfunding in the form of an initial public offering of shares to the public for registration on the Stock Exchange of Thailand under the abbreviation ONEE and commence trading of securities from November 5 of the same year.

== History ==
The One Enterprise began in March 1990 when Takonkiet Viravan flew back to Thailand after graduating from university in the United States. He then started working at Grammy Entertainment Co., Ltd. (formerly name of GMM Grammy) and began working as a drama director for Master Plan Co., Ltd., a subsidiary of Grammy (now A-Time Media Co., Ltd.) of Yuthana Mukdasanit and Wanich Jarungkitanan, which was established on July 6, 1988, producing four television dramas that aired from 1989 to 1990. Boy was assigned to direct two new sitcoms for Master Plan, namely Nang Fah See Rung and Sam Num Sam Mum, which were both successful.

=== Exact and Scenario ===
==== Exact ====
Exact logo

Later, Takonkiet wanted to produce his own dramas to be broadcast after the news, so he separated from Master Plan and established Exact Co., Ltd. and held the positions of producer, drama director, and managing director of the company himself. But it is also another subsidiary of Grammy for contract production of dramas, game shows, talk shows, variety shows, sitcoms, broadcast on various television channels. It was established on November 27, 1991. The company's first full-scale work was the drama "Rak Nai Roi Kaen" which aired in 1992 on Channel 5. Later, Exact was successful in producing many sitcoms until it became a leader in sitcom production in Thailand before Exact, including Master Plan, was acquired as a subsidiary of GMM Media Public Company Limited in November 2002.

==== Scenario ====
On April 9, 2004, Takonkiet expanded his business by establishing Scenario Co., Ltd., of which he currently holds 54.38%, GMM Media holds 25%, and Scenario artists, actors, and executives hold the remaining 20.62%. The company's objectives, similar to Exact's, are to produce shows for broadcast on various television channels, often in collaboration with Exact. However, Scenario has expanded its business beyond Exact by staging concerts and stage plays. It also later built and managed the Muang Thai Rachadalai Theatre on the 4th floor of Esplanade Ratchadaphisek, a joint venture with Muang Thai Life Assurance and Siam Commercial Bank, since 2007. This stage play and theater management business, Scenario, continues to operate today and since 2020 has also produced content for broadcasting on additional online channels, following the new vision of "More than a stage play." Jinnawat Siriwat is currently the Managing Director. In place of Takonkiet, who has been promoted to Chairman of the Board, Scenario is also the third largest shareholder in The One Enterprise today and was also an existing shareholder of The One Enterprise during its initial public offering.

==== Restructuring ====
On December 23, 2014, after GMM Grammy approved the sale of additional shares in GMM One TV Trading Co., Ltd. to Takonkiet and his group, the two shareholders entered into a joint agreement stipulating that Exact and Scenario would transfer all executives, production personnel, assets, and television production equipment, excluding the copyrights to Exact and Scenario's original content library, from GMM Media to GMM One TV Trading. This left Exact and Scenario with limited television business operations, primarily holding the copyrights to the original content library of television programs and dramas produced before the restructuring. Scenario would continue its stage plays and concert businesses, effective following the completion of the capital increase on March 27, 2015.

On August 24, 2017, Adelfos Co., Ltd., owned by the Sirivadhanabhakdi family, subscribed to additional shares of GMM Channel Trading Co., Ltd., the operator of GMM Grammy's GMM 25 channel business, which had also incorporated GMM Media into its subsidiary. The contract stipulated that GMM Grammy restructure its investment by directly acquiring and accepting the shares of Exact and Scenario, previously held by GMM Media, and transferring them to GMM Grammy as subsidiaries and associates.
