= Saksit Tangthong =

Thai actor (born 1967)

- ศักดิ์สิทธิ์ แท่งทอง
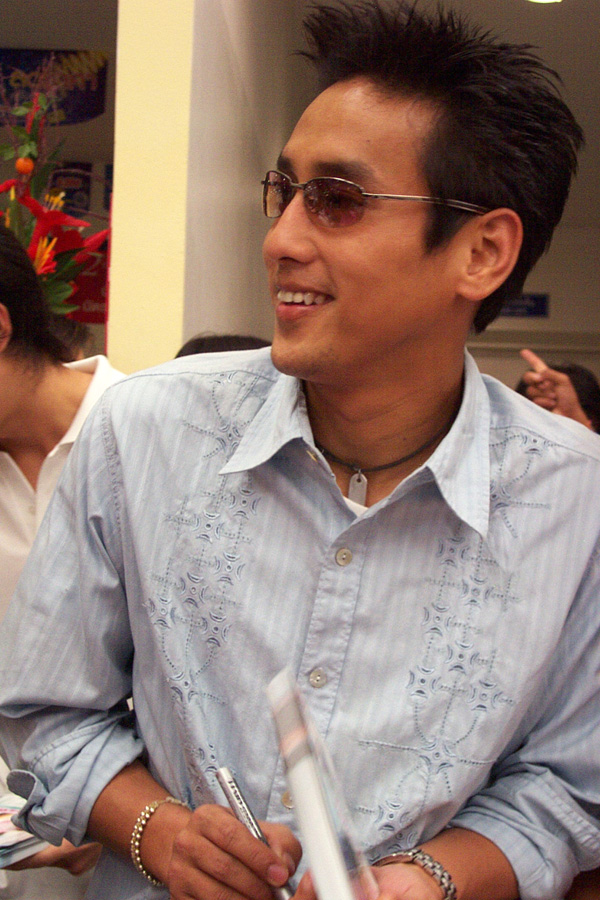
- Saksit in 2003
- Born: Saksit Tangthong; 6 June 1967 (age 58); Udon Thani, Thailand
- Occupation: Actor
- Height: 1.78 m (5 ft 10 in)
- Website: https://www.instagram.com/saksit_sstt

Saksit Tangthong (Thai: ศักดิ์สิทธิ์ แท่งทอง, born 6 June 1967) is a Thai actor. He became widely known from the popular 1991 teen comedy The Time Not Beyond (Kling Wai Kon Pho Son Wai) and the sitcom Sam Num Sam Mum, which ran from 1991 to 1998. He has since had acting roles in numerous Thai television soap operas, as well as the sitcom Bang Rak Soi Kao (2003–2012), and recorded several singles.
