= Takonkiet Viravan =

Thai television and stage producer and director

Takonkiet Viravan (Thai: ถกลเกียรติ วีรวรรณ, born 20 April 1966) is a Thai television and stage producer and director, and a business executive at media conglomerate GMM Grammy. He began directing television dramas and sitcoms in the 1990s, and founded Grammy subsidiary production companies Exact and Scenario. In the 2000s, he began branching into musical theatre, building the 1,500-plus-seat Muangthai Rachadalai Theatre to stage his own as well as international productions.
