= List of 2025 box office number-one films in Thailand =

This is a list of films which placed number one at the weekend box office for the year 2025 only in Bangkok, Metropolitan region and Chiang Mai, Thailand with the gross in Thai baht.

== Number-one films ==
#	Weekend end date	Film	Gross (฿ million)	Weekend openings in the Top 10	Ref.
1	January 5, 2025	Interstellar (re–release)	7.30	Six Lying University Students (#10)	
2	January 12, 2025	Interstellar (re–release)	4.80	Muay Thai Hustle (#5), House of Sayuri (#8)	
3	January 19, 2025	Panor	11.99	Wolf Man (#2), Babygirl (#3), Se7en (re–release) (#5), Tomorrow X Together: Hyperfocus in Cinemas (#10)	
4	January 26, 2025	Panor	5.04	Flight Risk (#2), Heretic (#3), Overlord: The Sacred Kingdom (#6)	
5	February 2, 2025	Panor	2.89	Companion (#2), Lembayung (#3), A Real Pain (#5), Weekend in Taipei (#8)	
6	February 9, 2025	Flat Girls	2.20	IU Concert: The Winning (#2), Flow (#3), Dark Nuns (#5), Devils Stay (#7), Curse of the Seven Oceans (#8)	
7	February 16, 2025	Captain America: Brave New World	23.25	Bridget Jones: Mad About the Boy (#4), Chhaava (#8), Serpent Beauty (#9)	
8	February 23, 2025	Legends of the Condor Heroes: The Gallants	8.65	Attack on Titan: The Last Attack (#3), Den of Thieves 2: Pantera (#4), Nosferatu (#5), Red Velvet Happiness Diary: My Dear, ReVe1uv in Cinemas (#6), Happy Monday(s) (#7), Cleaner (#8)	
9	March 2, 2025	Legends of the Condor Heroes: The Gallants	5.28	The Monkey (#3), Eternal Bond (#5), Mobile Suit Gundam GQuuuuuuX -Beginning- (#6), A Complete Unknown (#7), The Brutalist (#8)	
10	March 9, 2025	Mickey 17	5.37	Will You Marry Monk? (#3), Paddington in Peru (#4), Taeyeon Concert – The Tense: Live Viewing (#6)	
11	March 16, 2025	Ne Zha 2	11.80	Novocaine (#3), Mulu Nakru (#7), Cells at Work! (#8), ZEROBASEONE The First Tour: Timeless World in Cinemas (#10)	
12	March 23, 2025	The Red Envelope	20.40	Snow White (#2)	
13	March 30, 2025	The Red Envelope	5.87	A Working Man (#3), Doraemon: Nobita's Diary on the Creation of the World (#5), Spermageddon (#6), Presence (#7), The Haunted Hotel 2: Miss K (#8), Imagine Dragons: Live From The Hollywood Bowl (with the LA Film Orchestra) (#9)	
14	April 6, 2025	A Minecraft Movie	18.03	The Stone (#2), Halabala (#4), Seventeen 'Right Here' World Tour in Cinemas (#7), Locked (#9)	
15	April 13, 2025	A Minecraft Movie	9.51	The Amateur (#3), Graveyard Horror (#5), Colorful Stage! The Movie: A Miku Who Can't Sing (#7), Drop (#8)	
16	April 20, 2025	Sinners	5.98	Pengantin Setan (#9), Queer (#10)	
17	April 27, 2025	Tomb Watcher	9.42	Detective Conan: One-eyed Flashback (#2), The Accountant 2 (#5), Doraemon: Nobita's New Dinosaur (re–release) (#8), Kesari Chapter 2 (#10)	
18	May 4, 2025	Thunderbolts*	28.70	Fast Racing Jazz (#2), Doraemon: Nobita's Little Star Wars 2021 (re–release) (#10)	
19	May 11, 2025	Thunderbolts*	10.39	Until Dawn (#3), Home Sweet Home Rebirth (#6), Holy Night: Demon Hunters (#8), ATEEZ World Tour 'Towards the Light : Will to Power' in Cinemas (#9), Shadow Force (#10)	
20	May 18, 2025	Mission: Impossible – The Final Reckoning	18.18	Creation of the Gods II: Demon Force (#4), The Tutor (#5), RIIZE 'Odyssey' Premiere in Cinema (#9)	
21	May 25, 2025	Lilo & Stitch	33.76	Final Destination Bloodlines (#2), Pabrik Gula (#8), Bhool Chuk Maaf (#10)	
22	June 1, 2025	Lilo & Stitch	30.01	The Ritual (#5), Phra Ruang: Rise of the Empire (#6), About Family (#7), j-hope Tour 'Hope on the Stage': Live Viewing (#8), Kraken (#9)	
23	June 8, 2025	Lilo & Stitch	11.96	Ballerina (#2), Bring Her Back (#5), Petaka Gunung Gede (#6), Kaiju No. 8: Mission Recon (#7), Housefull 5 (#9), GALA (#10)	
24	June 15, 2025	How to Train Your Dragon	37.19	Hi-Five (#4), Dan Da Dan: Evil Eye (#7)	
25	June 22, 2025	How to Train Your Dragon	18.78	28 Years Later (#2), Elio (#3), Ha Gom: The Darkness of the Soul (#4), Attack 13 (#6), Sitaare Zameen Par (#9)	
26	June 29, 2025	F1	23.51	M3GAN 2.0 (#3), Yadang: The Snitch (#8)	
27	July 6, 2025	Jurassic World Rebirth	54.80	2025 RIIZE Concert Tour 'Riizing Loud' in Cinema (#4), The Supernatural Sweet Shop: The Movie (#7)	
28	July 13, 2025	Superman	33.90	Enhypen World Tour 'FATE' (#7), BTS Map of the Soul ON:E (#8), Them, Behind the Door (#9), Seventeen World Tour 'Be The Sun' (#10)	
29	July 20, 2025	Superman	12.64	Kayaor: Disrespecting Faith and the Supernatural (#3), Karate Kid: Legends (#5), Smurfs (#6), Noise (#7), Saiyaara (#9)	
30	July 27, 2025	The Fantastic Four: First Steps	34.12	Nak Loves Mak Sooo Much! (#5), Demon Slayer The Movie: Mugen Train (re–release) (#9), The Legend of Ochi (#10)	
31	August 3, 2025	The Fantastic Four: First Steps	10.55	Omniscient Reader: The Prophecy (#2), The Naked Gun (#4), I Know What You Did Last Summer (#6), My Beloved Stranger (#10)	
32	August 10, 2025	Weapons	9.63	Tha Rae: The Exorcist (#2), Freakier Friday (#5), The Bad Guys 2 (#7)	
33	August 17, 2025	Demon Slayer The Movie: Infinity Castle	54.06	Nancy Boy (#4), (Live Viewing) 2025 PLAVE Asia Tour 'DASH: Quantum Leap' in Seoul (#7), 6 Days (#10)	
34	August 24, 2025	Demon Slayer The Movie: Infinity Castle	23.06	Nobody 2 (#2), Super Junior's 20th Anniversary Tour 'Super Show 10' in Cinemas (#5), Red Sonja (#7), Sokaphiwat (#8), The Home (#10)	
35	August 31, 2025	Demon Slayer The Movie: Infinity Castle	12.33	Materialists (#2), A Useful Ghost (#3), Together (#4), Food Truck: Stolen Love... and Moo Deng (#5)	
36	September 7, 2025	The Conjuring: Last Rites	14.10	Jujutsu Kaisen: Hidden Inventory/Premature Death (#3), Disparage (#6), Sorry, Baby (#10)	
37	September 14, 2025	The Conjuring: Last Rites	5.85	The Shadow's Edge (#2), The Long Walk (#3), The Roses (#5), Princess Mononoke (re–release) (#8), The Toxic Avenger (#10)	
38	September 21, 2025	The Conjuring: Last Rites	2.49	Harry Potter and the Half-Blood Prince (re–release) (#3), Caught Stealing (#4), The Dark Knight (re–release) (#5), The Reunion (#8), Afterburn (#9)	
39	September 28, 2025	Chainsaw Man – The Movie: Reze Arc	5.31	One Battle After Another (#2), The Strangers – Chapter 2 (#4), Osiris (#5), BTS 2017 The Wings Tour The Final Remastered (#7), BTS 2016 HYYH On Stage Epilogue Remastered (#9), Jaws (re–release) (#10)	
40	October 5, 2025	Death Whisperer 3	51.30	Enhypen VR Concert: Immersion (#2), Avatar: The Way of Water (re–release) (#4), BTS 2019 World Tour 'Love Yourself: Speak Yourself' London Remastered (#6), BTS 2021 Muster Sowoozoo Remastered (#7), Dongji Rescue (#8)	
41	October 12, 2025	Death Whisperer 3	16.77	Tron: Ares (#2), Doraemon: Nobita's Art World Tales (#3), Good Boy (#5), Harry Potter and the Deathly Hallows – Part 1 (re–release) (#6), Gabby's Dollhouse: The Movie (#9), The Smashing Machine (#10)	
42	October 19, 2025	Death Whisperer 3	6.56	Black Phone 2 (#4), A Big Bold Beautiful Journey (#5), A Pale View of Hills (#7), The Legend of Hei II (#10)	
43	October 26, 2025	4 Tigers	16.12	Crayon Shin-chan the Movie: Super Hot! The Spicy Kasukabe Dancers (#3), Tomorrow X Together VR Concert: Heart Attack (#9), Regretting You (#10)	
44	November 2, 2025	4 Tigers	8.94	My Boo 2 (#2), Primitive War (#4), No Other Choice (#5), Shelby Oaks (#6), G-Dragon in Cinema: Übermensch (#7), NCT Wish 1st Concert Tour 'Into The Wish: Our Wish' in Cinemas (#8)	
45	November 9, 2025	Predator: Badlands	15.26	Ko Ga Loak Village (#3), Bugonia (#6), Good Fortune (#7), Harry Potter and the Deathly Hallows – Part 2 (re–release) (#8), Butt Detective the Movie: Star and Moon (#10)	
46	November 16, 2025	Now You See Me: Now You Don't	8.01	The Running Man (#3), Twice: One in a Mill10n (#8), 100 Meters (#9), In the Lost Lands (#10)	
47	November 23, 2025	Wicked: For Good	12.59	The Cursed Mask (#4), Warfare (#6), The First Ride (#10)	
48	November 30, 2025	Zootopia 2	35.74	The Last Shot (#2), Seventeen World Tour 'NEW_' in Japan: Live Viewing (#6), Keeper (#9)	
49	December 7, 2025	Zootopia 2	32.37	Our House (#2), Five Nights at Freddy's 2 (#3), Exit 8 (#5), Sisu: Road to Revenge (#7), Dhurandhar (#9), Monsta X: Connect X in Cinemas (#10)	
50	December 14, 2025	Zootopia 2	14.54	Beauty and the Beat (#3), Jujutsu Kaisen: Execution -Shibuya Incident x The Culling Game Begins- (#4), Eternity (#5)	
51	December 21, 2025	Avatar: Fire and Ash	70.38	Dream! (#8)	
52	December 28, 2025	Avatar: Fire and Ash	45.76	Hor Taew Tak: Split Li Hu (#3), Anaconda (#4), The SpongeBob Movie: Search for SquarePants (#7), #RunSeokjin_Ep.Tour The Movie (#9)	

== Highest-grossing films ==
=== In-Year Release ===
International film Thai film

Highest-grossing films of 2025 by In-year release (Only in Bangkok, Metropolitan region and Chiang Mai cinemas)
Rank	Title	Distributor	Gross (฿ million)
1	Avatar: Fire and Ash	Walt Disney Pictures	272.82
2	Demon Slayer The Movie: Infinity Castle	Sony Pictures Releasing	174.22
3	Jurassic World Rebirth	United International Pictures	146.50
4	Zootopia 2	Walt Disney Pictures	143.53
5	Death Whisperer 3	M Studio	136.96
6	Lilo & Stitch	Walt Disney Pictures	127.32
7	How to Train Your Dragon	United International Pictures	102.74
8	F1	Warner Bros. Pictures	73.32
9	Superman	Warner Bros. Pictures	71.30
10	Mission: Impossible – The Final Reckoning	United International Pictures	70.94

Highest-grossing films by MOC rating of 2025
G	Jurassic World Rebirth
13	Avatar: Fire and Ash
15	Death Whisperer 3
18	Our House

== See also ==
- List of highest-grossing films in Thailand

Preceded by 2024	2025	Succeeded by 2026
