= Undertaker (disambiguation) =

Undertaker is another name for a funeral director, someone involved in the business of funeral rites.

Undertaker or The Undertaker may also refer to:

== In music ==
- The Undertakers (band), a mid-1960s beat group
- The Undertaker, an unreleased album by Prince
- "Undertaker", a song by M. Ward from his 2003 album Transfiguration of Vincent
- "Undertaker", a song by T.I. from his 2006 album King
- "The Undertaker (Renholdër Mix)", a song by Puscifer first released on the 2006 soundtrack Underworld: Evolution
- "Undertaker", a song by CocoRosie from their 2010 album Grey Oceans
- "Undertaker", a song by electro house musician Wolfgang Gartner from his 2010 single of the same name

== In film and television ==
- The Undertaker (1932 film), a Czech comedy
- The Undertaker (1988 film), an American slasher film
- The Undertaker (2023 British film), a British thriller film
- The Undertaker (2023 Thai film), a Thai comedy-horror film
- The Undertaker, a character in The Muppet Christmas Carol
- Undertaker, a character in the anime series Black Butler
- "The Undertakers" (The Avengers), a 1963 episode of the British television series The Avengers
- Shinei "The Undertaker" Nōzen, a character in the anime series 86

== History ==
- Undertaker (17th century), a financier of the Plantations of Ireland
- Undertaker (18th century), a leader of the pro-government faction in the Irish Parliament

== Sports teams ==
- Port Glasgow F.C., a Scottish football club nicknamed the Undertakers
- Houston Takers, an American Basketball Association team formerly known as the Houston Undertakers

== People ==
- The Undertaker (nickname)
- Mark Calaway (born 1965), a retired professional wrestler in the WWE Hall of Fame who used The Undertaker as a ring name.
- Brian Lee (wrestler) (born 1966), a professional wrestler who went by the ring name of The Undertaker as an impostor
- Stefano Magaddino (1891–1974), Italian-American mob boss sometimes known as The Undertaker
- The Undertaker, stage name of DJ, rapper, and producer Prince Paul (born 1967) while performing in horrorcore rap group Gravediggaz
- The Undertakers, a professional wrestling Jobber tag-team

== Other uses ==
- "The Undertaker", a short story by Alexander Pushkin

== See also ==
- Undertaking (disambiguation)
