= List of 2026 box office number-one films in Thailand =

This is a list of films which placed number one at the weekend box office for the year 2026 only in Bangkok, Metropolitan region and Chiang Mai, Thailand with the gross in Thai baht.

== Number-one films ==
#	Weekend end date	Film	Gross (฿ million)	Weekend openings in the Top 10	Ref.
1	January 4, 2026	Avatar: Fire and Ash	37.52	The Housemaid (#3), Pop Dip Dip (#8), Roofman (#10)	
2	January 11, 2026	Avatar: Fire and Ash	13.17	Rental Family (#5)	
3	January 18, 2026	Avatar: Fire and Ash	7.21	Panor 2 (#2), Greenland 2: Migration (#3), Kokuho (#7), The Lord of the Rings: The Fellowship of the Ring (Extended Edition) (re–release) (#10)	
4	January 25, 2026	Return to Silent Hill	4.42	Mercy (#2), Primate (#5), Omukade (#8)	
5	February 1, 2026	King Keaw	4.34	Send Help (#2), Human Resource (#3), 5 Centimeters per Second (Animation) (#8), World Breaker (#10)	
6	February 8, 2026	Stray Kids: The dominATE Experience	2.56	Shelter (#2), 28 Years Later: The Bone Temple (#3), The Spoonerism (#10)	
7	February 15, 2026	The Undertaker 2	29.78	Wuthering Heights (#2), Umamusume: Pretty Derby – Beginning of a New Era (#5), Pillion (#6), Demon Slayer The Movie: Infinity Castle (re–release) (#7)	
8	February 22, 2026	The Undertaker 2	18.35	Crime 101 (#2), Detective Conan: Episode "ZERO" Kudo Shinichi Aquarium Case (#3), Back to the Past (#4), 5 Centimeters per Second (Live Action) (#5), The Strangers – Chapter 3 (#6), Hamnet (#7), Whistle (#8), ATEEZ VR Concert: Light the Way (#9)	
9	March 1, 2026	The Undertaker 2	8.37	The Stain (#2), Scream 7 (#3), Mobile Suit Gundam Hathaway: The Sorcery of Nymph Circe (#4), Gezhi Town (#5), Kinki (#7)	
10	March 8, 2026	Hoppers	17.05	Pee Nak 5 (#2), Enhypen World Tour 'Walk The Line' in Japan – Summer Edition in Cinemas (#3), The Bride! (#7), TWS VR Concert: 'Rush Road' (#8), If I Had Legs I'd Kick You (#10)	
11	March 15, 2026	Hoppers	11.39	Ghost Board (#2), Marty Supreme (#5), Iron Lung (#7), Number One (#8), The Mortuary Assistant (#10)	
12	March 22, 2026	Project Hail Mary	10.70	2026 NCT Dream Tour <The Dream Show 4: Future the Dream> Finale (#3), Dhurandhar: The Revenge (#5), Morlam Rhythm (#6), Blades of the Guardians (#8), Wooden Buddha (#9)	
13	March 29, 2026	Project Hail Mary	8.98	Ready or Not 2: Here I Come (#2), Airy in Busan (#7), The Dead Echoes (#8)	
14	April 5, 2026	Gohan	12.15	The Super Mario Galaxy Movie (#2), They Will Kill You (#4), Super Junior 20th Anniversary Tour 'Super Show 10' SJ–CORE in Cinemas (#6)	
15	April 12, 2026	Gohan	9.45	BTS World Tour 'Arirang' in Goyang: Live Viewing (#2), The Convenience Store (#5), Panda Plan: The Magical Tribe (#6), Dusun Mayit (#8)	
16	April 19, 2026	Lee Cronin's The Mummy	9.94	2026 NCT Wish 1st Concert Tour 'Into The Wish: Our Wish' Encore in Seoul in Cinemas (#10)	
17	April 26, 2026	Michael	7.33	Goat (#4), The Drama (#5), ONE OK ROCK Detox Japan Tour 2025 at Nissan Stadium in Cinemas (#6), Normal (#8), Le Sserafim VR Concert: Invitation (#10)	
18	May 3, 2026	The Devil Wears Prada 2	14.47	Detective Conan: Fallen Angel of the Highway (#2), The Monkey Hero (#5), Salmokji: Whispering Water (#8)	
19	May 10, 2026	Mortal Kombat II	5.86	Billie Eilish – Hit Me Hard and Soft: The Tour (Live in 3D) (#5), Khao Kala (#6), Ghost in the Cell (#7), Mother Mary (#8)	
20	May 17, 2026	The Sheep Detectives	4.78	Ghostfluencer (#3), In the Grey (#6), That Time I Got Reincarnated as a Slime the Movie: Tears of the Azure Sea (#7), Top Gun: Maverick (re–release) (#8), The King's Warden (#9), Top Gun (re–release) (#10)	
21	May 24, 2026	The Mandalorian and Grogu	13.15	Possessed (#2), Passenger (#4), 2026 TXT MOA CON in Japan: Live Viewing (#8)	
22	May 31, 2026	Haunted Universities 4	9.85	Hokum (#3), Until We Meet Again (#5), The Legend Hunters (#10)	
23	June 7, 2026	Colony	11.27	Masters of the Universe (#3), Scary Movie (#4), The Amazing Digital Circus: The Last Act (#5), Assassination Classroom The Movie: Our Time (#7)	
24	June 14, 2026	Disclosure Day	9.19	Backrooms (#2), BTS World Tour 'Arirang' in Busan: Live Viewing (#3), Kijsada Paradise (#5), PLAVE Asia Tour 'DASH: Quantum Leap' Encore in Cinemas (#7)	
25	June 21, 2026	Toy Story 5	24.02	Obsession (#2), The Furious (#5), Hungry (#7), Gintama the Movie 2026: Yoshiwara in Flames (#9)	
26	June 28, 2026	Toy Story 5	10.35	Supergirl (#2), The Djinn's Curse 2 (#4), The Death of Robin Hood (#7), Leviticus (#8)	
27	July 5, 2026	Minions & Monsters	12.10	Morte Cucina (#6), Sheep in the Box (#9), Mrs. Green Apple 'Zenjin Mito to Im/mutable' (#10)	
28	July 12, 2026	Moana	15.66	Evil Dead Burn (#3)	
29	July 19, 2026	The Odyssey	40.70	Wrecked (#6), The Dangers in My Heart (#9)	
30	July 26, 2026	The Odyssey	33.90	Pinocchio: Unstrung (#3), Behind The Screens (#5), Cold War 1994 (#8), The Last Song You Left Behind (#9), Kill Bill: The Whole Bloody Affair (#10)	
31	August 2, 2026	Spider-Man: Brand New Day	116.70	—N/a	
32	August 9, 2026	Spider-Man: Brand New Day	56.31	Dear You (#3), Ice Cream Man (#4), Uranus 2324 (Special Version) (#6), Her Private Hell (#10)	
33	August 16, 2026	Confessions of a Shaman	31.85	The End of Oak Street (#3), Paw Patrol: The Dino Movie (#5)	
34	August 23, 2026	Confessions of a Shaman	14.72	Insidious: Out of the Further (#3), Rinrada the Influencer (#6), Wind Up: The Movie (#7), Kung Fu Soccer (#8), One Night Only (#10)	
35	August 30, 2026	Confessions of a Shaman	7.09	The Dog Stars (#2), Harry Potter and the Philosopher's Stone (re–release) (#4), God Skin (#6), Midnight Incense (#9)	
36	September 6, 2026	In the Name of Love	5.68	Mutiny (#3), Fall 2: Deadpoint (#6), All Wishes Come True (#8)	
37	September 13, 2026	Hope	5.92	Oasis: Don't Look Back in Anger (#2), Blue Lock (#5), Practical Magic 2 (#6), The Resident (#9)	
38	September 20, 2026	Henry's First Dates	6.19	NCT 127 5th Tour 'Neo City: Seoul – The Redline' in Cinemas (#2), It Ends (#6)	
39	September 27, 2026	Resident Evil	21.30	Avengers: Endgame Encore (re–release) (#2), Heart of the Beast (#4), Enhypen VR Concert: Destiny (#5), Crayon Shin-chan the Movie: Spooky! My Yokai Vacation (#6), The Cycle (#8)	
40	October 4, 2026	Death Whisperer: Saming the Werebeast	24.12	Forgotten Island (#3), Verity (#5)	
41	October 11, 2026	Death Whisperer: Saming the Werebeast	11.95	Other Mommy (#3), Doraemon: New Nobita and the Castle of the Undersea Devil (#4), Digger (#5), Beware Boiúna (#6), Linkin Park: Unshatter (#7), Attack on Titan: The Last Attack (re–release) (#8)	
42	October 18, 2026	Death Whisperer: Saming the Werebeast	5.29	Always Lalisa (#2), Street Fighter (#3), Whalefall (#4), Runner (#8), To You in the Beyond (#10)	
43	October 25, 2026	Clayface	4.99	Nakee 3: The Cursed War (#2), Chiikawa the Movie: The Secret of the Mermaid Island (#3), Detective Conan: The Counterfeit Case of Ultra 30 (#4), BTS World Tour 'Arirang' in Buenos Aires: Live Viewing (#6), Charlie Harper (#7), Onslaught (#10)	
44	November 1, 2026	Akaliko Hotel	3.52	BTS World Tour 'Arirang' in São Paulo: Live Viewing (#5), Tame (#6), The Intern (#8)	
45	November 8, 2026	Ramayana: Rise of a Legend	12.50	Godzilla Minus Zero (#2), EXO Planet #6 - EXhOrizon 'dot' in Cinemas (#3), The Cat in the Hat (#6), The Mage (#10)	

== Highest-grossing films ==
=== In-Year Release ===
International film Thai film

Highest-grossing films of 2026 by In-year release (Only in Bangkok, Metropolitan region and Chiang Mai cinemas)
Rank	Title	Distributor	Gross (฿ million)
1	Spider-Man: Brand New Day	Sony Pictures Releasing	277.76
2	The Odyssey	United International Pictures	198.45
3	Confessions of a Shaman	M Studio	102.95
4	The Undertaker 2	Taibaan Studio	93.43
5	Death Whisperer: Saming the Werebeast	M Studio	65.65
6	Toy Story 5	Walt Disney Pictures	57.25
7	Resident Evil	Sony Pictures Releasing	56.27
8	Hoppers	Walt Disney Pictures	55.29
9	Gohan	GDH	53.33
10	Project Hail Mary	Sony Pictures Releasing	46.41

Highest-grossing films by MOC rating of 2026
G	Toy Story 5
13	Spider-Man: Brand New Day
15	The Odyssey
18	Confessions of a Shaman
20	Dhurandhar: The Revenge

== See also ==
- List of highest-grossing films in Thailand

Preceded by 2025	2026	Succeeded by 2027
