= List of 2023 box office number-one films in Thailand =

This is a list of films which placed number one at the weekend box office for the year 2023 only in Bangkok, Metropolitan region and Chiang Mai, Thailand with the gross in Thai baht.

== Number-one films ==
| # | Weekend end date | Film | Gross (฿ million) | Weekend openings in the Top 10 | Ref. |
|---|---|---|---|---|---|
| 1 | January 1, 2023 | Avatar: The Way of Water | 43.56 | Puss in Boots: The Last Wish (#2), Christmas Carol (#3), Shotgun Wedding (#5), Moon Man (#8), Men of Plastic (#9), The Lost King (#10) | |
| 2 | January 8, 2023 | Avatar: The Way of Water | 19.99 | Lady Boss: The Jackie Collins Story (#10) | |
| 3 | January 15, 2023 | Avatar: The Way of Water | 13.35 | M3GAN (#2), Gangnam Zombie (#4), The Woman King (#5), It's In The Woods (#9) | |
| 4 | January 22, 2023 | Avatar: The Way of Water | 6.93 | Mummies (#4), Babylon (#5), Ai Khai Dek Wat Chedi (#7), Into the Deep (#9), Sarasin Bridge of Love 2216 (#10) | |
| 5 | January 29, 2023 | Tid Noi: More Than True Love | 6.49 | Plane (#3), Pathaan (#4), Whitney Houston: I Wanna Dance with Somebody (#7), Billie Eilish Live at the O2 (Extended Cut) (#10) | |
| 6 | February 5, 2023 | BTS: Yet to Come in Cinemas | 6.99 | Knock at the Cabin (#4), Harry Potter and the Order of the Phoenix (re–release) (#5), The Fabelmans (#8) | |
| 7 | February 12, 2023 | You & Me & Me | 11.62 | Titanic (25th Anniversary re–release) (#2), Ditto (#7), Tár (#8) | |
| 8 | February 19, 2023 | Ant-Man and the Wasp: Quantumania | 33.36 | That Time I Got Reincarnated as a Slime the Movie: Scarlet Bond (#3), The Whale (#4) | |
| 9 | February 26, 2023 | Demon Slayer: To the Swordsmith Village | 12.83 | Cocaine Bear (#5), The Point Men (#6), Winnie-the-Pooh: Blood and Honey (#10) | |
| 10 | March 5, 2023 | Khun Pan 3 | 12.50 | Detective Conan: Episode of Haibara – Black Iron Mystery Train (#4), Creed III (#5), Missing (#8), To Every You I've Loved Before (#10) | |
| 11 | March 12, 2023 | Khun Pan 3 | 8.82 | Scream VI (#2), The First Slam Dunk (#3) | |
| 12 | March 19, 2023 | Shazam! Fury of the Gods | 10.21 | A Man Called Otto (#5), Tsurune: The Movie – The First Shot (#9), Magic Love (#10) | |
| 13 | March 26, 2023 | John Wick: Chapter 4 | 48.81 | Bad Social (#9) | |
| 14 | April 2, 2023 | John Wick: Chapter 4 | 20.69 | Dungeons & Dragons: Honour Among Thieves (#2), Inhuman Kiss: The Last Breath (#3) | |
| 15 | April 9, 2023 | Home for Rent | 16.33 | The Super Mario Bros. Movie (#2), Tiger Running (#4), Thunder Monk (#6), Air (#8) | |
| 16 | April 16, 2023 | Home for Rent | 8.04 | Suzume (#3), 65 (#5), Hoon Payon (#7), Renfield (#9), Pook Payon (#10) | |
| 17 | April 23, 2023 | Evil Dead Rise | 3.62 | Hidden Blade (#5), Operation Fortune: Ruse de Guerre (#6), The Covenant (#8) | |
| 18 | April 30, 2023 | Detective Conan: Black Iron Submarine | 5.84 | The Pope's Exorcist (#2), My Precious (#6), Ride On (#8) | |
| 19 | May 7, 2023 | Guardians of the Galaxy Vol. 3 | 50.54 | Best Friends Forever (#2) | |
| 20 | May 14, 2023 | Guardians of the Galaxy Vol. 3 | 21.52 | Knights of the Zodiac (#4) | |
| 21 | May 21, 2023 | Fast X | 48.41 | —N/a | |
| 22 | May 28, 2023 | The Little Mermaid | 29.04 | Shin Kamen Rider (#4), Tomorrow X Together World Tour (Act: Sweet Mirage) in LA (#5), The Tank (#6), Beau Is Afraid (#7), Delicious Romance (#10) | |
| 23 | June 4, 2023 | Spider-Man: Across the Spider-Verse | 18.93 | The Boogeyman (#4), The Ghost Station (#5), Walküre Final Live Tour 2023 Last Mission (#8), About My Father (#9) | |
| 24 | June 11, 2023 | Transformers: Rise of the Beasts | 39.35 | Il buco (#8), JFK Revisited: Through the Looking Glass (#10) | |
| 25 | June 18, 2023 | The Flash | 21.72 | The Roundup: No Way Out (#5), Phubao Thaibaan: Final Chapter (#8), SUGA: Road to D-DAY (#9), j-hope IN THE BOX (#10) | |
| 26 | June 25, 2023 | Elemental | 8.64 | No Hard Feelings (#5), Hypnotic (#6), My Happy Marriage (#7), The Wandering Earth 2 (#8) | |
| 27 | July 2, 2023 | Indiana Jones and the Dial of Destiny | 9.03 | Long Live Love! (#2), Ruby Gillman, Teenage Kraken (#6), Resident Evil: Death Island (#7) | |
| 28 | July 9, 2023 | Long Live Love! | 10.45 | Born to Fly (#4), Past Lives (#5), Joy Ride (#10) | |
| 29 | July 16, 2023 | Mission: Impossible – Dead Reckoning Part One | 29.40 | The Lord of the Rings: The Return of the King (re–release) (#8) | |
| 30 | July 23, 2023 | Oppenheimer | 20.85 | Barbie (#2), After Sundown (#4) | |
| 31 | July 30, 2023 | Oppenheimer | 15.79 | Insidious: The Red Door (#4), Haunted Mansion (#5), The Childe (#7), Sisu (#8) | |
| 32 | August 6, 2023 | Meg 2: The Trench | 17.81 | Kandahar (#6) | |
| 33 | August 13, 2023 | Meg 2: The Trench | 9.95 | One and Only (#3), Mondo (#6), Side by Side (#10) | |
| 34 | August 20, 2023 | Blue Beetle | 9.53 | Black Magic Mask (#5) | |
| 35 | August 27, 2023 | Man Suang | 11.84 | Teenage Mutant Ninja Turtles: Mutant Mayhem (#3), The Moon (#4), Cobweb (#6), Simulant (#8) | |
| 36 | September 3, 2023 | Gran Turismo | 5.72 | Crayon Shin-chan: Mononoke Ninja Chinpūden (#3), Postman (#4), Concrete Utopia (#6), The Nun (re–release) (#8), Strays (#10) | |
| 37 | September 10, 2023 | The Nun II | 13.72 | Talk to Me (#2), Retribution (#3), Jawan (#5), Love in an Old Album (#8), The Three Musketeers: D'Artagnan (#10) | |
| 38 | September 17, 2023 | A Haunting in Venice | 7.65 | The Equalizer 3 (#2), Gridman Universe (#6), Monster (#9), Ransomed (#10) | |
| 39 | September 24, 2023 | Expend4bles | 4.60 | Immersion (#6), Kumarn (#7), Haunting of the Queen Mary (#8), Immortal Species (#9), Psycho-Pass Providence (#10) | |
| 40 | October 1, 2023 | The Creator | 10.04 | The Djinn's Curse (#2), IU CONCERT : The Golden Hour (#3), Saw X (#4) | |
| 41 | October 8, 2023 | The Undertaker | 16.02 | Doraemon: Nobita's Sky Utopia (#2), The Exorcist: Believer (#3), The Black Demon (#6), Freelance (#7) | |
| 42 | October 15, 2023 | The Undertaker | 39.60 | Taylor Swift: The Eras Tour (#2), 14 Again: I Love You Two Thousand (#3), Mantra Warrior: The Legend of the Eight Moons (#4), PAW Patrol: The Mighty Movie (#6), It Lives Inside (#10) | |
| 43 | October 22, 2023 | The Undertaker | 39.57 | Killers of the Flower Moon (#3), Death is All Around (#8), Minna no Uta (#9), The Secret Kingdom (#10) | |
| 44 | October 29, 2023 | Death Whisperer | 71.57 | Not Friends (#3), Tokyo MER (#9), The Hunger Games: Catching Fire (re–release) (#10) | |
| 45 | November 5, 2023 | Death Whisperer | 35.09 | Five Nights at Freddy's (#3), RedLife (#5), Digimon Adventure 02: The Beginning (#7), The Hunger Games: Mockingjay – Part 1 (re–release) (#9), Club Zero (#10) | |
| 46 | November 12, 2023 | The Marvels | 26.50 | Naga Folklore (#7), Tastes of Horror (#8) | |
| 47 | November 19, 2023 | The Hunger Games: The Ballad of Songbirds & Snakes | 12.79 | Dumb Money (#6), The Bridge Curse: Ritual (#9), New Gods: Yang Jian (#10) | |
| 48 | November 26, 2023 | Napoleon | 5.98 | Wish (#2), Love Reset (#8), Insomniacs After School (#10) | |
| 49 | December 3, 2023 | 4 Kings II | 29.48 | Animal (#7), The Marsh King's Daughter (#9) | |
| 50 | December 10, 2023 | 4 Kings II | 14.82 | Wonka (#2), NCT NATION: To The World in Cinemas (#3), Trolls Band Together (#5), Thanksgiving (#6) | |
| 51 | December 17, 2023 | Wonka | 7.53 | Aquaman (re–release) (#3), Dream Scenario (#5) | |
| 52 | December 24, 2023 | Aquaman and the Lost Kingdom | 28.86 | Renaissance: A Film by Beyoncé (#4), Dunki (#5) | |
| 53 | December 31, 2023 | Aquaman and the Lost Kingdom | 19.42 | Shin Jigen! Crayon Shin-chan the Movie (#4), E-Sarn Zombie (#5), Migration (#6), Silent Night (#7), Nednari (#9) | |

== Highest-grossing films ==
=== In-Year Release ===
International film Thai film

Highest-grossing films of 2023 by In-year release (Only in Bangkok, Metropolitan region and Chiang Mai cinemas)
| Rank | Title | Distributor | Gross (฿ million) |
|---|---|---|---|
| 1 | The Undertaker | Taibaan Studio | 244.95 |
| 2 | Death Whisperer | M Studio | 197.53 |
| 3 | John Wick: Chapter 4 | Mongkol Major | 127.80 |
| 4 | Fast X | United International Pictures | 123.53 |
| 5 | Guardians of the Galaxy Vol. 3 | Walt Disney Pictures | 122.09 |
| 6 | Aquaman and the Lost Kingdom | Warner Bros. Pictures | 98.96 |
| 7 | 4 Kings II | Shinesaeng Ad.Venture | 95.17 |
| 8 | Transformers: Rise of the Beasts | United International Pictures | 85.80 |
| 9 | Ant-Man and the Wasp: Quantumania | Walt Disney Pictures | 82.85 |
| 10 | Mission: Impossible – Dead Reckoning Part One | United International Pictures | 79.99 |

Highest-grossing films by MOC rating of 2023
| G | Aquaman and the Lost Kingdom |
| 13 | Fast X |
| 15 | Death Whisperer |
| 18 | The Undertaker |
| 20 | Hoon Payon |

== See also ==
- List of highest-grossing films in Thailand

| Preceded by 2022 | 2023 | Succeeded by 2024 |
