= Undertaking =

Undertaking may refer to:

- A task (project management), in general
- The services provided by an undertaker, mortician, or a funeral director
- A formal legal promise to do something
  - Surety bond
- A company, in business, in particular in European Union law where the term is used interchangeably
- Undertaking (driving), overtaking another vehicle using a lane nearer the curb-side
- Undertaking (band), a Hungarian thrash metal band
- "The Undertaking", an episode of Arrow

== See also ==
- Undertaker (disambiguation)
