= List of 2024 box office number-one films in Thailand =

This is a list of films which placed number one at the weekend box office for the year 2024 only in Bangkok, Metropolitan region and Chiang Mai, Thailand with the gross in Thai baht.

== Number-one films ==
#	Weekend end date	Film	Gross (฿ million)	Weekend openings in the Top 10	Ref.
1	7 January 2024	Aquaman and the Lost Kingdom	7.50	Anyone but You (#2), Ladybug & Cat Noir: The Movie (#8)	
2	14 January 2024	The Beekeeper	7.63	The Boy and the Heron (#2), Next Goal Wins (#9)	
3	21 January 2024	The Beekeeper	4.56	The Elite of Devils (#3), China Town Cha Cha (#5), Elevator Game (#7)	
4	28 January 2024	Moei: The Promised	5.36	Blue Giant (#3), The Three Musketeers: Milady (#5), Miller's Girl (#7), Fighter (#8), Oppenheimer (re–release) (#9)	
5	4 February 2024	Argylle	5.15	Perfect Days (#5)	
6	11 February 2024	Mobile Suit Gundam SEED Freedom	2.62	The Goldfinger (#4), Pattaya Heat (#5), Dune (re–release) (#6), Baghead (#7), Turning Red (#8)	
7	18 February 2024	Madame Web	6.07	Mean Girls (#2), Kamen Rider 555 20th: Paradise Regained (#7)	
8	25 February 2024	Pee Nak 4	16.34	Poor Things (#2), Queen Rock Montreal (#6), Moscow Mission (#8), Dog Days (#9), Detective Conan: The Phantom of Baker Street (re–release) (#10)	
9	3 March 2024	Dune: Part Two	26.35	Demon Slayer: Kimetsu no Yaiba – To the Hashira Training (#3), Geji: The Spirit Hunter (#5), How to Have Sex (#9)	
10	10 March 2024	Kung Fu Panda 4	15.80	Detective Conan vs. Kid the Phantom Thief (#5), The Bricklayer (#6), Imaginary (#7), The Zone of Interest (#8), Shaitaan (#10)	
11	17 March 2024	Hor Taew Tak: The Finale	16.41	Spy × Family Code: White (#4), No Way Up (#6), Bob Marley: One Love (#7)	
12	24 March 2024	Exhuma	11.04	Immaculate (#6), Love Lies Bleeding (#9)	
13	31 March 2024	Godzilla x Kong: The New Empire	50.94	500 Days of Summer (#9), Crew (#10)	
14	7 April 2024	How to Make Millions Before Grandma Dies	48.63	The First Omen (#5), Mothers' Instinct (#9)	
15	14 April 2024	How to Make Millions Before Grandma Dies	32.54	Civil War (#3), Ghostbusters: Frozen Empire (#4), Suga Agust D Tour: D Day – The Movie (#5), April, Come She Will (#8)	
16	21 April 2024	How to Make Millions Before Grandma Dies	14.33	Abigail (#6), Something in the Water (#7), YOLO (#10)	
17	28 April 2024	How to Make Millions Before Grandma Dies	7.55	Love You to Debt (#2), The Fall Guy (#3), Pa Cha Da (#6), aespa World Tour in Cinemas (#7)	
18	5 May 2024	My Boo	12.82	Tarot (#4), The Ministry of Ungentlemanly Warfare (#5), Challengers (#7)	
19	12 May 2024	Kingdom of the Planet of the Apes	21.20	When Evil Lurks (#6), Under Parallel Skies (#7), While You Were Sleeping (#10)	
20	19 May 2024	Kingdom of the Planet of the Apes	8.35	IF (#3), The Strangers: Chapter 1 (#4), The Tenant (#5), Monkey Man (#6), Millennium Actress (#9)	
21	26 May 2024	Furiosa: A Mad Max Saga	10.54	The Garfield Movie (#2)	
22	2 June 2024	Haunted Universities 3	14.28	Haikyu!! The Dumpster Battle (#2), The Roundup: Punishment (#6), Ferrari (#8), Boy Kills World (#9)	
23	9 June 2024	Bad Boys: Ride or Die	7.42	Breaking the Cycle (#4), Formed Police Unit (#5), The Watchers (#7)	
24	16 June 2024	Inside Out 2	25.73	Late Night with the Devil (#4), Hit Man (#7)	
25	23 June 2024	Inside Out 2	20.05	The Exorcism (#4), 18×2 Beyond Youthful Days (#7)	
26	30 June 2024	A Quiet Place: Day One	14.84	The Bikeriders (#5), Kalki 2898 AD (#7)	
27	7 July 2024	Despicable Me 4	12.52	Uranus2324 (#4), Wake Up (#7)	
28	14 July 2024	Twisters	7.80	The Cursed Land (#3), Kan Kaung (#8)	
29	21 July 2024	Twisters	4.36	Escape (#3), Grave Torture (#8)	
30	28 July 2024	Deadpool & Wolverine	48.73	Pha Dam Kham Ai (#3)	
31	4 August 2024	Deadpool & Wolverine	26.87	Operation Undead (#2), Longlegs (#3), Trap (#4), Blackpink World Tour 'Born Pink' in Cinemas (#5), Given The Movie: Hiiragi Mix (#7)	
32	11 August 2024	Deadpool & Wolverine	11.79	Detective Conan: The Million-dollar Pentagram (#2), Mana Man (#3), Borderlands (#4), Fly Me to the Moon (#6)	
33	18 August 2024	Alien: Romulus	13.71	It Ends with Us (#5), Subservience (#9), Stree 2 (#10)	
34	25 August 2024	The Paradise of Thorns	16.01	Seventeen Tour 'Follow' Again to Cinemas (#3), Blue Lock the Movie: Episode Nagi (#5), The Crow (#6), Blink Twice (#7), Kinds of Kindness (#9)	
35	1 September 2024	The Paradise of Thorns	16.19	Crayon Shin-chan the Movie: Our Dinosaur Diary (#2), The Floor Plan (#3), Project Silence (#5), Strange Darling (#9), Exit (#10)	
36	8 September 2024	Out of the Nest	20.90	Beetlejuice Beetlejuice (#3), VIP Death Seat (#4), Hijack 1971 (#5), Vina: Before 7 Days (#6)	
37	15 September 2024	Out of the Nest	7.32	Taklee Genesis (#3), Riize Fan-Con Tour 'Riizing Day' Finale in Cinemas (#4), Speak No Evil (#6), Bad Genius (#9), Achilles Curse and the Curse of Treasure (#10)	
38	22 September 2024	Out of the Nest	2.96	Never Let Go (#2), Jung Kook: I Am Still (#6), Oddity (#7), Bat War (#8)	
39	29 September 2024	Transformers One	4.26	The Holy Man Comeback (#2), The Substance (#5), Survivre (#6), I, the Executioner (#7), Joker (re–release) (#9)	
40	6 October 2024	Joker: Folie à Deux	6.57	Doraemon the Movie: Nobita's Earth Symphony (#2), Plave Fan Concert 'Hello, Asterum!' Encore (#4)	
41	13 October 2024	Death Whisperer 2	104.97	Vicky Vidya Ka Woh Wala Video (#9), Love Live! The School Idol Movie (#10)	
42	20 October 2024	Death Whisperer 2	43.82	The Wild Robot (#2), Smile 2 (#3), Canary Black (#4), Taeyong: TY Track in Cinemas (#6), Look Back (#7), Woman of the Hour (#9)	
43	27 October 2024	Death Whisperer 2	17.69	Venom: The Last Dance (#2), Dangerous Boys 2 (#3), Love in the Big City (#6)	
44	3 November 2024	Death Whisperer 2	9.45	You Will Die in 6 Hours (#3), We Live in Time (#4), Anora (#6), Don't Sleep (#7), Absolution (#8), A Legend (#10)	
45	10 November 2024	Red One	7.79	Terrifier 3 (#4), My Hero Academia: You're Next (#5), Endpresso (#10)	
46	17 November 2024	Gladiator II	10.23	The Lord of the Rings: The Fellowship of the Ring (Extended Edition) (#4), Malee (#6), Fuuto PI: Portrait of Kamen Rider Skull (#9), Bagman (#10)	
47	24 November 2024	Wicked	11.47	Police Modify (#4), Elevation (#6), The Lord of the Rings: The Two Towers (Extended Edition) (#8), High Forces (#9), A Normal Family (#10)	
48	1 December 2024	In Youth We Trust	13.07	404 Run Run (#3), The Lord of the Rings: The Return of the King (Extended Edition) (#7), Baekhyun: Lonsdaleite (dot) in Cinemas (#9)	
49	8 December 2024	Moana 2	16.84	Pushpa 2: The Rule (#5), The Lord of the Rings: The War of the Rohirrim (#7), Striking Rescue (#9), Here (#10)	
50	15 December 2024	Moana 2	7.12	Rider (#3), Start It Up (#4), NCT DREAM Mystery Lab: DREAM( )SCAPE in Cinemas (#5), Seventeen (Right Here) World Tour in Japan: Live Viewing (#7)	
51	22 December 2024	Mufasa: The Lion King	11.94	Sumala (#4), Isan Nikah (#8)	
52	29 December 2024	Mufasa: The Lion King	7.50	Sonic the Hedgehog 3 (#2), The Cliche (#3), Kraven the Hunter (#5), Dominion of Darkness (#10)	

== Highest-grossing films ==
=== In-Year Release ===
International film Thai film

Highest-grossing films of 2024 by In-year release (Only in Bangkok, Metropolitan region and Chiang Mai cinemas)
Rank	Title	Distributor	Gross (฿ million)
1	Death Whisperer 2	M Studio	286.08
2	How to Make Millions Before Grandma Dies	GDH	172.57
3	Deadpool & Wolverine	Walt Disney Pictures	154.15
4	Godzilla x Kong: The New Empire	Warner Bros. Pictures	114.12
5	Inside Out 2	Walt Disney Pictures	97.67
6	Dune: Part Two	Warner Bros. Pictures	82.65
7	The Paradise of Thorns	GDH	70.25
8	My Boo	Karman Line Studio	64.07
9	Pee Nak 4	Five Star Production	62.37
10	In Youth We Trust	Shinesaeng Ad.Venture	53.99

Highest-grossing films by MOC rating of 2024
G	How to Make Millions Before Grandma Dies
13	My Boo
15	Death Whisperer 2
18	In Youth We Trust
20	Poor Things

== See also ==
- List of highest-grossing films in Thailand

Preceded by 2023	2024	Succeeded by 2025
