= Fatima Dechawaleekul =

Thai actress (born 2005)

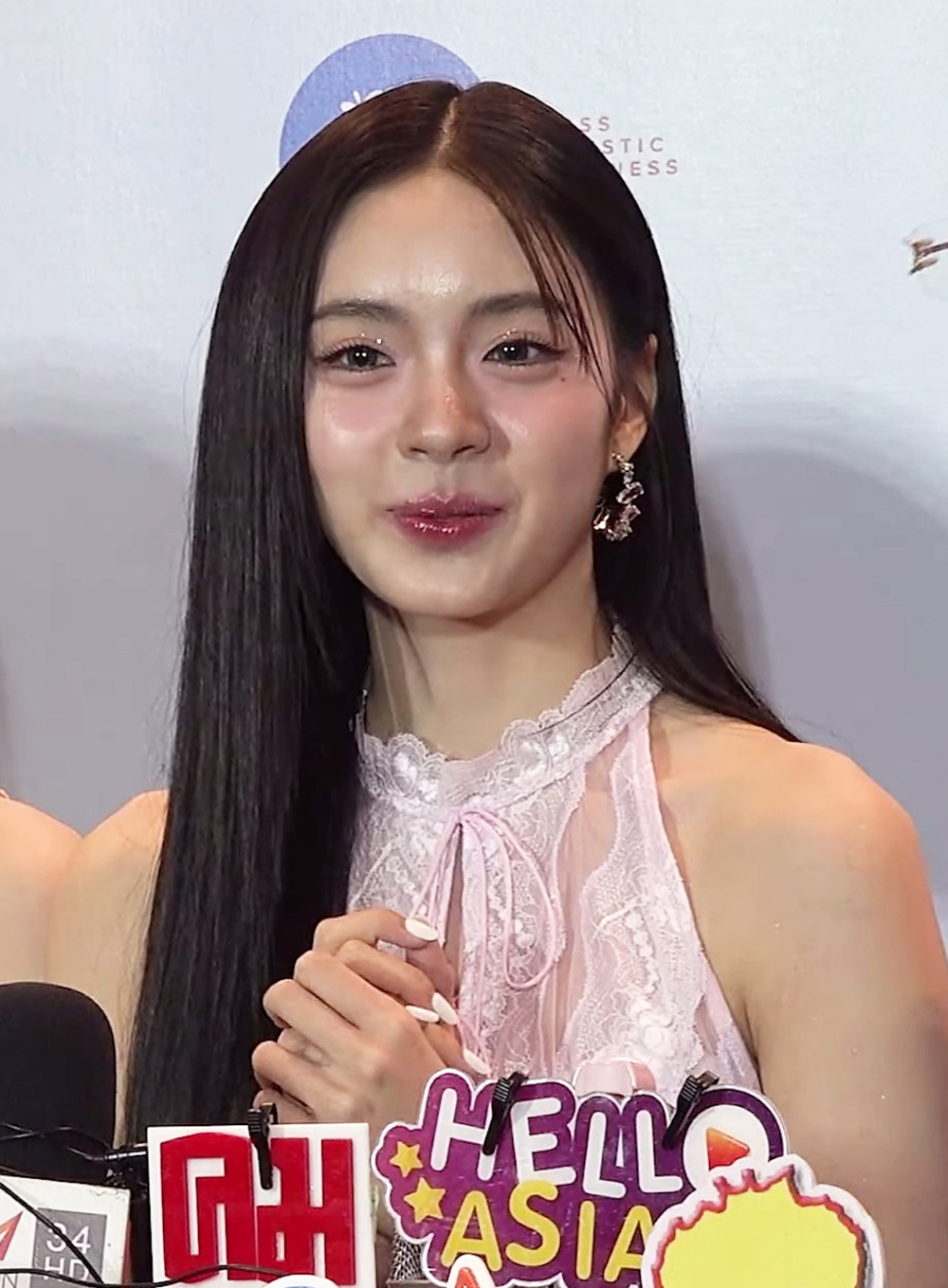
- Fatima in 2024
- Born: 6 March 2005 (age 21); Ubon Ratchathani province, Thailand
- Education: College of Music, Mahidol University
- Occupations: singer; actress
- Years active: 2021–present
- Agent: The One Enterprise (2021–present)

Fatima Dechawaleekul (born 6 March 2005), nicknamed EarnEarn, is a Thai singer and actress under The One Enterprise, starting her career after participating in a television program, The Star Idol, in 2021.

== Life ==
Fatima was born on 6 March 2005 in Ubon Ratchathani province, Thailand. Her nickname "EarnEarn" is from Chinese "ēn" (恩), which means "mercy".

Fatima took junior secondary education in India at the age of 12 years and later took senior secondary education in New Zealand. Following that, she studied for a bachelor's degree at the College of Music, Mahidol University, from which she graduated in 2025.

== Career ==
Fatima started her entertainment career by participating in a television program called The Star Idol in 2021, in which she was one of the eight finalists.

In 2022, she released her debut single called "Lucky Color" and debuted as an actress with a leading role in the television series My Sassy Princess, where she starred as Cinderella. In 2023, she was given another leading role in the television series Across the Sky.

On 17 July 2024, it was announced that Fatima would take a girls' love role in the GDH's film Flat Girls. On 23 October 2024, it was also announced that she would take another girls' love role in the television series No Romeo, which would be aired on One 31.

== Discography ==
=== Singles ===
Year	Title	Ref.
2022	"Lucky Color"	

=== Other songs ===
Year	Title	Notes	Ref.
2022	"O-o" (Thai: โอ๋โอ๋)	With Dechawat Pondechaphiphat (Copper)	
2025	"In the Nick of Time"	Decalcomania OST	
2026	"Ying Rak Ying Chep" (Thai: ยิ่งรักยิ่งเจ็บ)	Sot Soi Mala OST	

== Filmography ==
=== Television series ===
Year	Title	Part	Role	Network	Ref.
2022	My Sassy Princess	Cinderella	Cinderella	One 31	
2023	Across the Sky		Khongkhwan	One 31	
2026	The Bangkok Red Opera		Mala	One 31	
TBA	Kobori		Angsumalin	One 31	
TBA	No Romeo			One 31	

=== Films ===
Year	Title	Role	Ref.
2025	Flat Girls	Ann	
2025	Everybody Loves Me When I'm Dead	Achala Chitdi (Khem)	

=== Music video appearances ===
Year	Title	Artist	Ref.
2023	"Chip Kon Dai Mai" (Thai: จีบก่อนได้ไหม)	Jakkapat Wattanasin (Jaokhun)	
2024	"Golden Hour"	Putthipong Assaratanakul (Billkin)	
2025	"Doubtless"	Nattawat Jirochtikul (Fourth)	
2026	"Flashback"	Setthapong Ewasuk (Guncharlie)	
2026	"Thiprueksa" (Thai: ที่ปรึกษา)	4Eve	
2026	"Doe" (Thai: เด๋อ)	Phuwasit Ananpornsiri (Joey)	

=== Musicals ===
Year	Title	Role	Ref.
2023	Faen Chan: The Musical (Thai: แฟนฉัน เดอะมิวสิคัล)	Manao	

== Awards and nominations ==
Awards	Year	Category	Work	Result	Ref.
Bangkok Critics Assembly Awards	2026	Best Leading Actress	Flat Girls	Won	
Feed X Khaosod Awards	2025	Actress of the Year (Film)	Flat Girls	Won	
Feed X Khaosod Awards	2026	Actress of the Year (Series)	The Bangkok Red Opera	Nominated	
Howe Awards	2026	Howe Rising Icon Award	—N/a	Won	
Kazz Awards	2023	Rising Female of the Year	—N/a	Nominated	
Kom Chad Luek Awards	2026	Best Leading Actress	Flat Girls	Won	
Suphannahong National Film Awards	2026	Best Leading Actress	Flat Girls	Nominated	
Thai Film Director Awards	2026	Best Leading Actress	Flat Girls	Won	
TrustGu Thai Film Awards	2026	Best Leading Actress	Flat Girls	Won	
