= The Edge of Horizon (Thai TV series) =

2026 Thai television series

- Official series poster
- Thai: อรุณรุ่ง
- Genre: Boys' love; Historical drama; Romance
- Screenplay by: Chawanon Sarapat; Wantawil Suknoy; Apirat Hinkaew
- Directed by: Kathadeb Thaivanit
- Starring: Jakkrasin Atsavatanachai; Theethuch Khummuang
- Music by: Apisit Wongchoti
- Opening theme: "First Light (แสงแรก)" by Ongsa Theethuch
- Country of origin: Thailand
- Original language: Thai
- No. of episodes: 11

Production
- Cinematography: Banjong Saengwisutsai
- Running time: 47–80 minutes

Original release
- Network: One 31; OneD
- Release: 20 June – 29 August 2026

The Edge of Horizon (Thai: อรุณรุ่ง; RTGS: Arun Rung; lit. 'Breaking Dawn') is a 2026 Thai historical boys' love television series, starring Jakkrasin Atsavatanachai (Inn) and Theethuch Khummuang (Ongsa).

Set against the backdrop of the Siamese revolution of 1932, the series explores a romance between two men from different social classes during one of the most significant political transitions in Thai history.

The series premiered on 20 June 2026 on One 31, airing on Saturdays at 20:30 ICT. The uncut version was made available for streaming on the OneD app at 21:30 ICT. It was made also available for streaming internationally on GagaOOLala, Line TV and Heavenly. The series concluded on 29 August 2026.

== Plot ==
Set in 1932 during the political transformation of Siam, the series follows the relationship between Phob and Prince Tinnakorn Varakulvathin. Despite their deep bond, the two come from opposite sides of society: one possesses only his dignity, while the other carries the weight of his royal lineage.

Amid the social and political tensions of the era, their relationship is tested by class differences, family expectations, and the traditions that shape their world. As the country undergoes historic change, both men must decide whether to follow the rules imposed upon them or fight for their right to love.

== Cast and characters ==
=== Main ===
- Jakkrasin Atsavatanachai (Inn) as Phobthee Munkongphak (Phob)
- Theethuch Khummuang (Ongsa) as Prince Tinnakorn Varakulvathin (Tin)

=== Supporting ===
- Kathaleeya McIntosh (Mam) as Nual (Phob's mother)
- Chartayodom Hiranyasthiti (Chai) as Prince Vasin Varakulvathin (Tinnakorn's father)
- Ponlawit Ketprapakorn (Pond) as Prince Chatthorn Varakulvathin (Tinnakorn's brother)
- Nattaya Thongsaen (Plengkwan) as Jan
- Prinda Techaiya (Prim) as Princess Ruethaisiri Rachaneewet (Siri)
- Duangjai Hathaikarn (Eed) as Princess Pattamapreeya (Tinnakorn's grandmother)
- Patchanok Iamsa-ard (Berm) as Ueam
- Totrakul Jantima (Pom) as Sakchai
- Lerwith Sangsith (Aon) as Kitti

== Soundtrack ==
The Edge of Horizon Soundtrack
No.	Title	Writer(s)	Artist	Length
1.	""First Light (แสงแรก)""	Amp Achariya Dulyapaiboon	Ongsa Theethuch	4:11
2.	""I Love You So Much (รักเธอเหลือเกิน)"" (Original by Fluke Krirkphol)	Sarapee Sirisamphan	Inn; Ongsa	4:25

== Production ==
The series was officially announced on 25 February 2026 during The One Phenomenon Shake the Screen 2026 event held at the Muangthai Rachadalai Theatre in Bangkok, where One31 and OneD unveiled their 2026 programming lineup.

== Marketing ==
The series was promoted with a blessing ceremony held at the GMM Grammy building on 18 June 2026. The first episode was promoted with The Edge of Horizon World Premiere event held at Major Cineplex Ratchayothin on 20 June 2026. The Edge of Horizon Fan Screening Ep 6 with InnOngsa was held at SF World Cinema, CentralWorld on 25 July 2026.

The final episode was promoted with the The Edge of Horizon Final Ep with InnOngsa fan screening event held at Idea Live, Bravo BKK on 29 August 2026.

== Awards and nominations ==
Award nominations for The Edge of Horizon
Year	Award	Category	Nominee(s)	Result	Ref.
2026	Pattaya International Film Festival 2026	Outstanding BL Series	The Edge of Horizon	Won	
