= Girl from Nowhere =

2018 Thai-language television series

- Promotional poster for Season 2
- Thai: เด็กใหม่ The Series
- Genre: Anthology; Thriller; Mystery; Horror; Fantasy; Teen drama
- Screenplay by: Kongdej Jaturanrasamee; Aticha Tanthanawigrai; Tinnapat Banyatpiyapoj
- Starring: Chicha Amatayakul; Chanya McClory
- Music by: Kritthum Kawjang; Chaibovon Seelookwar; Grittatham Khaojang
- Country of origin: Thailand
- Original language: Thai
- No. of seasons: 2
- No. of episodes: 21

Production
- Executive producers: Phawit Chitrakorn; Ekachai Uekrongtham; Boosaba Daoruang; Somrote Vasupongstorn; Vacharee Siriwachwiwat; Nataya Srivicha; Paiboon Damrongchaitham; Jina Osothsilp; Kittisak Chuang-a-roon; Rafah Damrongchaitham
- Producers: Nalina Chayasombat; Chai-A-Nan Soijumpa
- Camera setup: Single camera
- Running time: 37-50 minutes
- Production companies: GMM Grammy (2018); SOUR; Jungka Bangkok; BRAVO! Studios (2021); GMM Studios (2021)

Original release
- Network: GMM 25
- Release: August 8 – October 31, 2018
- Network: Netflix
- Release: May 7, 2021

Related
- Girl from Nowhere: The Reset

Girl from Nowhere (Thai: เด็กใหม่; RTGS: Dek Mai; lit. New Kid) is a Thai mystery thriller anthology television series created by studio SOUR Bangkok and starring Chicha "Kitty" Amatayakul in the lead role.

The first season was released on August 8, 2018, on GMM 25. A second season was released globally on Netflix on May 7, 2021, which exposed the show to international fame. It has hit number one on the currently most watched Netflix shows in Thailand, Vietnam and the Philippines, while also ranking in the top 10 in countries around the world such as Brazil. The show has been critically acclaimed for the usage of unconventional storytelling and takes on modern high school society.

== Premise ==
The plot revolves around Nanno, an enigmatic girl who transfers to different private schools in Thailand and exposes the students and faculty's stories of lies, secrets, and hypocrisy. Nanno on occasion lies to provoke others. She is revealed to be a mischievous immortal entity, punishing wrongdoers for their crimes and misdeeds. In Season 2, Nanno meets her match in newfound rival Yuri, who has a different, more revenge-focused ideology and wants to take over Nanno's duties.

== Cast ==
- Chicha Amatayakul as Nanno, a mysterious girl with supernatural powers and an enigmatic origin. Nanno serves as both guide and punisher to humans who hide secrets, perform harmful acts to others, and have selfish desires. Nanno is revealed to be an immortal entity that has the power to expose the lies and misdeeds of everyone she meets serving them the appropriate punishment no matter how big or small. Nanno is neither good nor evil in her crusade as she judges everyone equally, and while she feels no regret towards hurting people she only hurts those who have harmed others. She will however help those who are not inherently bad but are lost or trying to do better for themselves. Nanno prefers taking her time and planning how to deal with her marks before ending her mind games with satisfactory results. Nanno's outfit consists of her short medium-length, bowl-cut/bob hairstyle with bangs, female school uniform, and her inhuman-like cackle. She has similarities to the Junji Ito manga character Tomie Kawakami which was credited as an inspiration for the role, according to Amatayakul.
- Chanya McClory (season 2) as Yuri, Nanno's rival. Yuri was originally a victim Nanno attempted to help after she was mistreated by two rich girls who blackmailed students, including Yuri, with sex tapes of her and others being raped. However, Yuri had already planned for revenge on the girls since her assault, and instead of listening to Nanno's advice she used Nanno as a sacrifice for her plan, hiring two men to assault and film the girls, in the same way Yuri was. Yuri's plan backfires however when the men also kill Yuri to hide their crime, drowning her in a bathtub that a bleeding Nanno was later placed in. Nanno's blood revived Yuri, giving her the same powers and immortality as her. Unlike Nanno though, Yuri prefers to spread chaos and get Nanno’s marks killed by others using lies and manipulation. Yuri shows signs of being sociopathic and has no remorse for her actions. Yuri's outfit is also a traditional female school uniform, with her hair tied in a ponytail using a red ribbon.

== Episodes ==
Season	Episodes	Originally released		
Season	Episodes	First released	Last released	Network
1	13	August 8, 2018	October 31, 2018	GMM 25
2	8	May 7, 2021		Netflix
3	6	March 7, 2026		Netflix

=== Season 1 (2018) ===
Each episode consists of individual stories and the appearance of Nanno at different schools.

No. overall	No. in season	Title	Directed by	Original release date
1	1	"The Ugly Truth"	Pairach Khumwan	August 8, 2018
Nanno transfers to a school that boasts a spotless reputation, where she uncovers a predatory teacher who blackmails female students. She turns the tables by involving his own family. Guest stars: Thanavate Siriwattanagul (Mr. Win); Shinaradee Anupongpichart (Vaew); Janpim Rachawangmuang (Wan); Nijsa Suwannapreksachati (Mrs. Mali); Naerunchara Lertprasert (Mei)
2	2	"Apologies"	Sitisiri Mongkholsiri	August 15, 2018
The popular boys try to take advantage of Nanno, while the jealous girls decide to betray her. The group tries to bury their guilt, but they realize that getting rid of Nanno is impossible. Guest stars: Poompat Iam-samang (Hok); Nutchapan Paramacharoenroj (Neung); Ratchnon Wasurat (Chit); Pajaree Nantarat (Tim); Thitinan Khlangphet (Taew)
3	3	"Trophy"	Apiwat Supateerapong	August 22, 2018
Mew is an average student surrounded by "geniuses" at her high school. Nanno helps her achieve instant fame through plagiarism, leading her into a spiral of paranoia and inescapable lies. Guest stars: Chonnikan Netjui (Mew); Sornsiri Chawalitworakul (Pui); Ratchanee Boonyatharokul (Mrs. Plearn); Sran Tongpan (Headmaster)
4	4	"Hi-So"	Khomkrit Treewimol	August 29, 2018
Dino is a working-class student pretending to be a millionaire to fit in with his wealthy peers. Nanno pushes him to throw a party at a fake mansion, forcing him into dangerous choices with his actual parents' money. Guest stars: Natthasit Kotimanaswanich (Dino); Chatchanan Chantajinda (Pop); Phakinai Junpiyakul (Tap); Risa Suzuki (Whan); Thanaphat Waranuphap (To); Nuttapol Kummata (Dino's dad); Sumontha Suanpholhat (Dino's mom)
5	5	"Social Love"	T-Thawat Taifayongvichit	September 5, 2018
Hann, a student who already has a girlfriend, is forced into a fake relationship with Nanno to become a viral influencer couple. Social media pressure forces him to maintain the lie, destroying his real life. Guest stars: Tatchapol Thitiapichai (Hann); Chanicha Boonpanuvichit (Yui); Yossawat Sittiwong (Jer); Thanawan Ngamphron (Thun)
6	6	"Wonderwall (Part 1)"	Jatuphong Rungrueangdechaphat	October 10, 2018
The manager of the school soccer team, consumed by intense jealousy toward Nanno, discovers that the bathroom wall grants any written wish of hatred or revenge against someone else. Guest stars: Morakot Liu (Bam); Pinsuda Saimai (Good); Pradanai Nateprasertkul (O); Pakapol Srirongmuang (Teng); Phanisa Kungsadan (Maid)
7	7	"Wonderwall (Part 2)"	Jatuphong Rungrueangdechaphat	October 17, 2018
Absolute chaos erupts when the rest of the students discover the power of the wall. Everyone begins attacking each other anonymously, turning the high school into a physical nightmare. Guest stars: Morakot Liu (Bam); Pinsuda Saimai (Good); Pradanai Nateprasertkul (O); Pakapol Srirongmuang (Teng); Phanisa Kungsadan (Maid)
8	8	"Lost & Found"	Sivawut Sewatanon	September 12, 2018
Nanno meets TK, a kleptomaniac who steals to get the attention of his absent father. Unlike other episodes, Nanno bonds with him and forms a genuine human connection before teaching a lesson about loss. Guest stars: Ekawat Niratvorapanya (TK); Lerwith Sangsith (TK's butler); Chawakorn Phetsaitip (Headmaster); Preeyasuda Akkarasrisawad (Teacher 1)
9	9	"Trap"	Jatuphong Rungrueangdechaphat	September 19, 2018
A dangerous escaped killer infiltrates a school. Trapped inside a single classroom, a group of students and their teacher quickly fall into madness, distrust, and mutual violence while trying to survive. Guest stars: Awat Ratanapintha (Koh); Anuchyd Sapanphong (Mr. Tor); Somjade Theprangsimankul (Suer); Karntheera Kaosaard (Kaew); Chompoopuntip Temtanamongkol (Tang)
10	10	"Thank You, Teacher"	Varayu Rukskul	September 26, 2018
The strict teacher, Ms. Aum, is heavily pressured by the school administration to change her teaching style. On the brink of a nervous breakdown due to personal issues, she takes drastic and violent measures. Guest stars: Claudia Chakrabandhu Na Ayudhya (Mrs. Aum); Rinrada Pornsombutsatien (Mrs. Pim); Dechatorn Wasurat (Atom); Soontorn Meesri (Headmaster); Thanissara Lappatharanon (Convenience store cashier)
11	11	"The Rank"	Chai-A-Nan Soijumpa	October 3, 2018
In a girls' school that ranks its students on a literal beauty wall, Ying drops from the Top 10 after Nanno arrives. Obsessed with regaining her status, Ying resorts to extreme cosmetic methods. Guest stars: Piyathida Mitrteeraroj (Headmaster); Apasiri Kittithanon (Ying); Punyapa Srathdatip (Gade); Penpitcha Chaiyasert (Chommpoo); Sirada Hathaiwuttipong (Chommpoo (after))
12	12	"BFF (Part 1)"	Khomkrit Treewimol	October 24, 2018
A high school class reunites years later to open a time capsule. As they look back, tensions rise when Nanno reappears to bring to light a terrible past crime that everyone wanted to forget. Guest stars: Nutnicha Luanganunkun (Fong); Kunchanuj Kengkarnka (Thap/Tan); Kongkid Visessiri (Wit); Supavee Palisriroj (Bell); Thitichaya Chiwpreecha (Proud)
13	13	"BFF (Part 2)"	Khomkrit Treewimol	October 31, 2018
The dark truth behind the old school crime is revealed at the alumni dinner. The former classmates turn on each other in a bloody battle for survival and blame. Guest stars: Nutnicha Luanganunkun (Fong); Kunchanuj Kengkarnka (Thap/Tan); Kongkid Visessiri (Wit); Supavee Palisriroj (Bell); Thitichaya Chiwpreecha (Proud)

=== Season 2 (2021) ===
Nanno is joined by a schoolgirl named Yuri, who becomes immortal after meeting Nanno.

No. overall	No. in season	Title	Directed by	Original release date
14	1	"Pregnant"	Pairach Khumwan	May 7, 2021
Nanai is the most popular boy in school, known for impregnating girls and abandoning them. Nanno approaches him and, through poetic justice, makes him experience pregnancy in his own body. Guest stars: Teeradon Supapunpinyo (Nanai); Theerarat Wongchuen (Petch); Sadanon Durongkaveroj (Jeng); Karnpicha Pongpanit (Lookmhee)
15	2	"True Love"	Khomkrit Treewimol	May 7, 2021
In a strict all-girls school that has recently gone co-ed, romance is severely forbidden. Nanno sabotages the tech-driven tracking system and pushes a repressed teacher to break her own rules. Guest stars: Penpak Sirikul (Teacher Nareumon Trisiriwimol); Natda Chawawanid (Teacher Linda); Surapol Poonpiriya (Headmaster); Orranat Meeklai (Young Nareumon); Jarusri Sukrajun (Young Reuthal); Theerameth Pheerabawornsuk (Punjan); Jinjutha Korkitthavron (Namneung)
16	3	"Minnie and the Four Bodies"	Pairach Khumwan	May 7, 2021
Minnie is a rich girl who causes a fatal car crash that kills four classmates. Thanks to her wealthy father's corruption, she avoids prison, but Nanno traps her in a psychological hell of guilt. Guest stars: Patricia Good (Minnie); Chanya McClory (Yuri); Sahajak Boonthanakit (Minnie's father); Adisak Treesirikasem (Ploen's father); Pijika Jittaputta (Ploen's mother) Note: This episode is also based on a true story called "Praewa and 9 bodies" (แพรวา9ศพ).
17	4	"Yuri"	Sitisiri Mongkholsiri	May 7, 2021
Nanno tries to help Yuri, a poor student mistreated by her wealthy friends. However, Yuri discovers Nanno's secret and orchestrates a violent betrayal that grants her immortal powers and a thirst for explicit revenge. Guest stars: Chanya McClory (Yuri); Thasorn Klinnium (Nana); Apichaya Phanichtrakool (Tubtim); Jidapa Sae-eiab (Meen)
18	5	"SOTUS"	Khomkrit Treewimol	May 7, 2021
Kaye, a senior student, brutally hazes freshmen in a violent school initiation ritual. After getting expelled because of Nanno, he transfers to a new school where the roles reverse and he becomes the victim. Guest stars: Bhumibhat Thavornsiri (Kaye/K) Chanya McClory (Yuri); Chalee Immak (Headmaster)
19	6	"Liberation"	Paween Purijitpanya & Surawut Tungkharak	May 7, 2021
In a rigid institution where breaking rules leads to severe punishment, Nanno openly defies the system. Yuri intervenes to speed up the punishment, triggering an absolute student rebellion against the staff. Guest stars: Patharawarin Timkul (Teacher A); Chanya McClory (Yuri); Chutima Teepanat (Teacher B); Vutichai Srisantiroj (Headmaster); Sujitra Hemhiran (Mie); Phromporn Phrommapirom (Jelly); Ratchanon Aungsirisawat (New)
20	7	"JennyX"	Jatuphong Rungrueangdechaphat	May 7, 2021
JennyX is a famous influencer tired of her parents exploiting her for money. Nanno helps her fake her death to escape, but Yuri ruins the plan, leaving Jenny completely identity-less and ruined. Guest stars: Phantira Pipityakorn (JennyX); Chanya McClory (Yuri); Supoj Pongpancharoen (JennyX's father); Nipawan Taweepornsawon (JennyX's mother)
21	8	"The Judgement"	Khomkrit Treewimol	May 7, 2021
Nanno and Yuri clash over the fate of Junko, a sick student, and her mother, who hides bloody secrets. Nanno begins to doubt her own moral judgments, weakening her powers ahead of a bloody climax. Guest stars: Yarinda Bunnag (Teacher Waan) Chanya McClory (Yuri); Ploy Sornarin (Junko)

== Conception and development ==
The storylines in the episodes are inspired by actual real news reports where schoolgirls were victimized, but with the intent of showing how the victims will ultimately become the victor. For instance, "Minnie and the Four Bodies" was based on an incident where a student had crashed her car into a university van killing four people, and had avoided the consequences because of her family's wealthy connections.

"SOTUS" was also based on an incident where a senior punishes a junior for failing to follow the hazing rules, resulting in homicide.

Lead actress Amatayakul used Tomie, a Japanese horror manga featuring a succubus-like woman, as her reference for the series.

Days before auditioning for the role of Yuri, Chanya McClory had just started recovery for having an operation for removing a brain tumor. Her determination to get the role won over the casting crew and inspired her to empower her character.

== Release ==
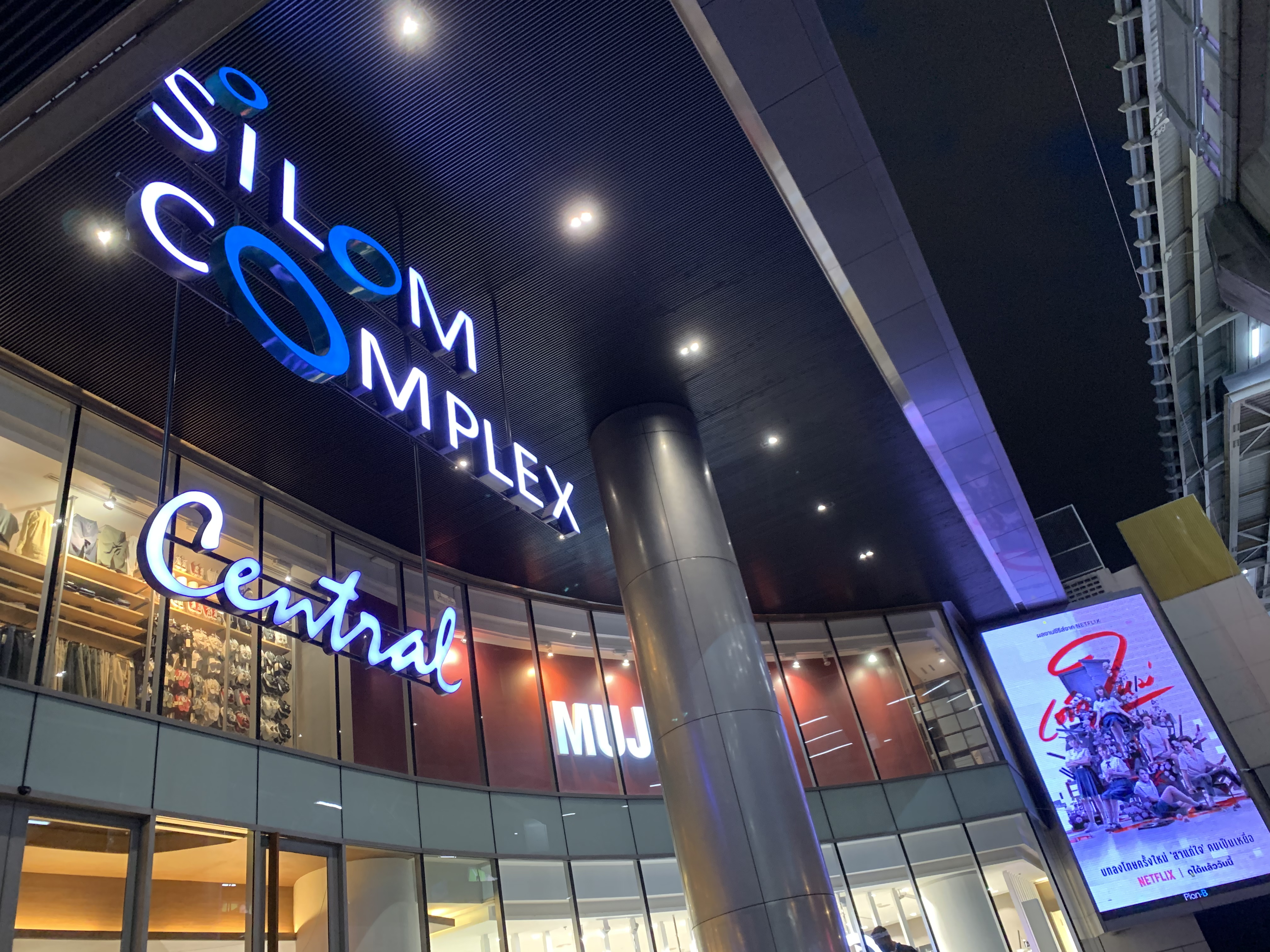

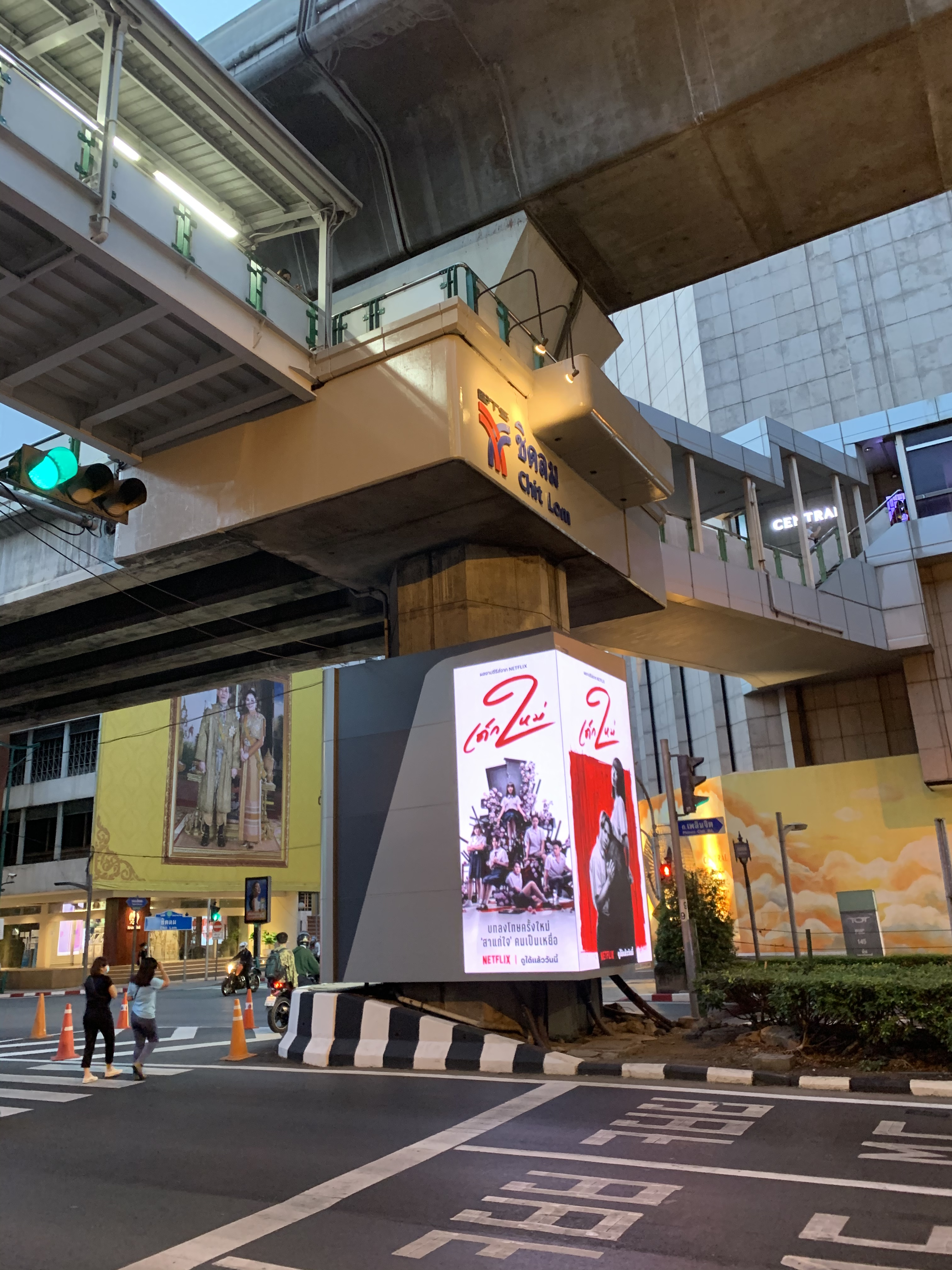
Adverts for Girl From Nowhere’s second season at Silom Complex Central and Phloen Chit BTS Station, Bangkok.

The first season of Girl From Nowhere was released on August 8, 2018, on GMM 25. It was also released on Netflix on October 31, 2018.

On April 19, 2021, a trailer was released for the second season. Season 2 has 8 episodes and was released on May 7, 2021, on Netflix.

== Reboot ==
A remake titled Girl from Nowhere: The Reset was released on March 7, 2026 on ONE31 with the uncut version streaming on Netflix.

== Japanese remake ==
A Japanese remake starring Arisa Nakajima as Nanno started streaming on Fuji Television’s FOD platform on April 24, 2026.

The ad for the remake (collaboration with Wacoal) sparked a controversy for inappropriate use of suggestive language, with its advertisement featuring a female student unbuttoning her skirt in class.

== Awards and nominations ==
Name of the award ceremony, year presented, category, nominee of the award, and the result of the nomination
Ceremony	Year	Award	Recipient	Result	Ref
3rd Asia Contents Awards	2021	Best Creative	Girl From Nowhere Season 2	Nominated	
3rd Asia Contents Awards	2021	Best OTT Original	Girl From Nowhere Season 2	Nominated	
3rd Asia Contents Awards	2021	Best Asian TV Series	Girl From Nowhere Season 2	Won	
