= Thakhi Onglaor =

Thai actor and model

- ทาฆิ อ่องลออ
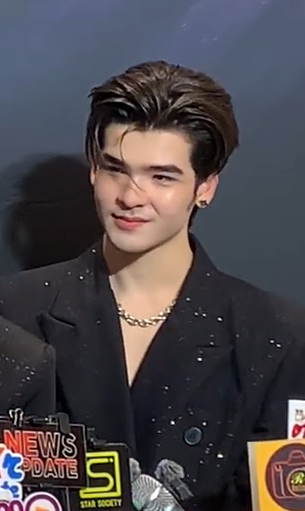
- Thakhi in 2026
- Born: 14 February 2007 (age 19); Thailand
- Other names: Thakhi (ทาฆิ), Thakhi Onglaor, Thakhi Kawin Onglao, Win (วิน)
- Occupations: Actor; model
- Years active: 2023–present
- Agent: Channel 3
- Known for: Mark in Nednari; Thara in The Cursed Love; Krit in Decoding You

Thakhi Kawin Onglaor (Thai: ทาฆิ กวิน อ่องลออ; born 14 February 2007), is a Thai actor and model of Thai, French, and Chinese descent. He is known for his leading role in the film Nednari (2023), his role as Thara in the series The Cursed Love (2025). In 2026, he stars in the series Decoding You on Channel 3.

== Career ==
Thakhi began his artistic career as a model before transitioning into acting. Before joining Channel 3, he was part of the group of young artists at A Entertainment, an agency managed by Suppachai Srivijit (A). In 2023, he appeared in the film Nednari, portraying Mark, alongside Nattawat Jirochtikul (Fourth).

In 2025, Thakhi joined the cast of the fantasy series The Cursed Love, broadcast by Channel 3, portraying Thara, one of the series' three protagonists.

In 2026, he was announced as a lead actor in the boys' love series Decoding You, formerly titled Dear Brother... I'm in Love with You, in which he portrays Krit alongside Peerakrit Phacharaboonyakiat (Friend). The series is an original production of Channel 3.

== Filmography ==
=== Film ===
Year	Title	Role	Notes	Ref.
2023	Nednari	Mark	Main role	

=== Television series ===
Year	Title	Role	Network	Notes	Ref.
2025	The Cursed Love	Thara	Channel 3	Supporting role	
TBA	Decoding You	Krit	Channel 3	Main role	

=== Television show ===
Year	Title	Network	Notes
2024	T-Pop Stage Show	Workpoint TV	18 January 2024

=== Music video appearances ===
Year	Title	Artist	Ref.
2024	"น่าเสียดาย (Your Loss)"	Seya Thongchua	

== Discography ==
=== Singles ===
==== Collaborations ====
Year	Title	Artist	Ref.
2023	"เรื่องเล็กเรื่องสำคัญ"	A Entertainment Trainee	

==== Soundtrack appearances ====
Year	Song	Artist	Album	Ref.
2025	"รักที่ตามหา (Rak Thi Tam Ha)"	Leozundo feat. Thakhi Onglaor, Mos and Pat Chadwick	The Cursed Love OST	
