= The Cursed Love =

2025 Thai television series

- รัก สาป สูญ
- Genre: Romantic drama; Fantasy; Boys' love
- Written by: Benjatala Olannitikul; Suphachai Sittiaumponpan
- Directed by: Phawat Panangkasiri
- Starring: Kittipon Tippayatayarut; Theethuch Khummuang
- Opening theme: "The Cursed Love (รักสาปสูญ)" by Ongsa Theethuch
- Country of origin: Thailand
- Original language: Thai
- No. of episodes: 8

Production
- Executive producer: Suppachai Srivijit
- Producer: Siriphan Sangnoi
- Cinematography: Kompetch Asavapacharasakul
- Running time: 46–49 minutes
- Production company: Ayu Entertainment

Original release
- Network: Channel 3; YouTube
- Release: 8 October – 26 November 2025

The Cursed Love (Thai: รัก สาป สูญ; RTGS: Rak Sap Sun, lit. 'Love Curse Vanish') is a 2025 Thai boys' love fantasy drama series, starring Kittipon Tippayatayarut (Au) and Theethuch Khummuang (Ongsa). The series was produced by Ayu Entertainment, directed by Phawat Panangkasiri (Mai) and written by Benjatala Olannitikul and Suphachai Sittiaumponpan.

The series premiered on Channel 3 on 8 October 2025, airing on Wednesdays at 22:30 ICT.

== Synopsis ==
Siwat (Theethuch Khummuang), a young man burdened by a mysterious ability that ignites flames in sync with his heartbeat, sets out on a perilous journey to find a cure. His search leads him to the mythical Heart of Divine Magic, said to be hidden in the ruins of an ancient city. Along the way, he crosses paths with Khunkhao (Kittipon Tippayatayarut), a mountain rescuer with wind-based powers and a personal mission to keep the city’s secrets buried. Their encounter sparks a conflict that intertwines magic, destiny, and an unexpected emotional bond.

== Cast and characters ==
=== Main ===
- Kittipon Tippayatayarut (Au) as Khunkhao / Asuni
- Theethuch Khummuang (Ongsa) as Siwat Merton (Sin) / Suriya / Peem

=== Supporting ===
- Thakhi Onglaor as Thara / Apo
- Leonardo Zundo as Dean
- Pat Chadwick as Korkarn
- Kittipoom Phosuwan (Ti) as Pun
- Kaewthip Noranithiwan (Minna) as Lookwaii
- Chayanit Chayjaroen (Tita) as Mind
- Kittidech Phuphattarawut (Mos) as Earth
- Jinna Navarat (Jinn) as Kalakal
- Sarut Vichitrananda (Big) as Professor Thakoon
- Chaiyaporn Oliver Poupart (An) as Michael Merton
- Marisa Anita as Maria Merton
- Passin Ruangvuth (A) as Aisoon
- Watcharabul Leesuwan (Note) as Singkhon
- Pattamawan Kaomulkadee (Yui) as Kate
- Rong Kaomulkadee as Uncle Klai
- Ampa Phusit (Aew) as Aunt Lek

== Original soundtrack ==
The Cursed Love Soundtrack
No.	Title	Writer(s)	Artist	Length
1.	"The Cursed Love (รักสาปสูญ)"	Ratthawich Ananbhornsiri	Ongsa Theethuch	3:44
2.	"Rak Thi Tam Ha (รักที่ตามหา)"	Ratthawich Ananbhornsiri	Leozundo; Thakhi Onglaor; Kittidech Phuphattarawut; Pat Chadwick	2:52

== Reception ==
The series has drawn attention for its high production value and ambitious fantasy elements. According to Tonboriday, The Cursed Love is among the most expensive Thai BL dramas ever produced, with a budget exceeding 20 million baht. TrueID praised the series for its visual effects and emotional storytelling. Kapook highlighted the chemistry between the leads and the integration of Thai mythology.

Thairath and MGR Online also covered the premiere and fan reactions. Additional coverage appeared in Khaosod and Insight Daily.

== Awards and nominations ==
Award nominations for The Cursed Love
Year	Award	Category	Nominee(s)	Result	Ref.
2026	Thailand Y Content Awards 2025	Best Costume Design	The Cursed Love	Nominated	
2026	Thailand Y Content Awards 2025	Best Promotion of Thai Culture	The Cursed Love	Nominated	
2026	Thailand Y Content Awards 2025	Best Special Effects	The Cursed Love	Nominated	
2026	Thailand Y Content Awards 2025	Best Series Soundtrack	"The Cursed Love"	Nominated	
