= Peerakrit Phacharaboonyakiat =

Thai actor

- เฟรนด์ พีระกฤตย์ พชรบุณยเกียรติ
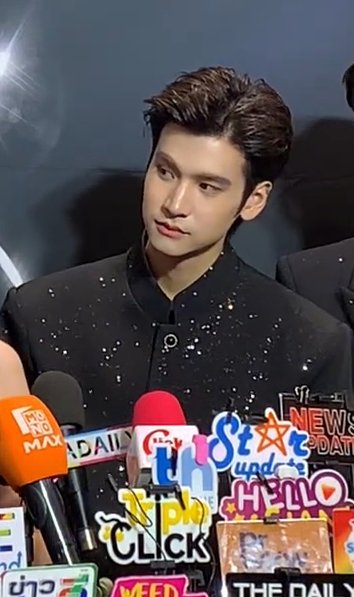
- Friend in 2026
- Born: 16 March 2002 (age 24); Thailand
- Occupation: Actor
- Years active: 2019–present

Peerakrit Phacharaboonyakiat (Thai: เฟรนด์ พีระกฤตย์ พชรบุณยเกียรติ; born 16 March 2002), also known as Friend, is a Thai actor. He is known for his roles in the films Death Whisperer (2023), Death Whisperer 2 (2024) and Death Whisperer 3 (2025). In 2026, he stars in the series Decoding You.

== Career ==
Peerakrit made his television debut in 2022, when he played Nemo in the series Koo Wein on Channel 3. In 2023, he played Yod in the horror film Death Whisperer, reprising the role in the sequels Death Whisperer 2 (2024) and Death Whisperer 3 (2025).

In 2025, he appeared in several television series, including My Safe Zone, Only You and Jai Khang Jao. In 2026, he played Ryu Dragon in Payak Raai Sorn Laai. In the same year, he stars in the BL series Decoding You, alongside Kwin Onglaor (Thakhi), on Channel 3.

== Filmography ==
=== Film ===
Year	Title	Role	Notes
2023	Death Whisperer	Yod	Main role
2024	Death Whisperer 2	Yod	Main role
2025	Death Whisperer 3	Yod	Main role

=== Television series ===
Year	Title	Role	Notes	Channel/platform
2022	Koo Wein	Nemo	Supporting role	Channel 3
2024	Pon Chiwan	Nop (Phana's son)	Supporting role	Channel 3
2024	Lom Len Fai	Mark	Guest role	Channel 3
2025	My Safe Zone	Tim	Supporting role	Channel 3
2025	Only You	Pete (singer)	Supporting role	Channel 3
2025	Jai Khang Jao	Ming	Supporting role	Channel 3
2026	Payak Raai Sorn Laai	Ryu Dragon	Supporting role	Channel 3
2026	Decoding You	Non	Main role	Channel 3

=== Television programs ===
Year	Title	Role	Notes
2019	Tee Tai Krua	Guest	Episode 305
2020	The Wall Song	Guest	Episode 263
2021	Today Show	Guest	Episode 248

== Awards and nominations ==
Year	Award	Category	Result	Work
2026	MAYA TV AWARDS 2026: MAYA Popular	Breakthrough Actor	TBA	-
