= Decoding You =

2026 Thai television series

- Official series poster
- Thai: โคตรรัก
- Genre: Boys' love; Drama
- Directed by: Pawanrat Naksuriya
- Starring: Peerakrit Phacharaboonyakiat; Thakhi Onglaor
- Country of origin: Thailand
- Original language: Thai
- No. of episodes: 8

Production
- Running time: 45 minutes

Original release
- Network: Channel 3
- Release: 4 October 2026 – present

Decoding You (Thai: โคตรรัก), formerly titled Dear Brother, is an upcoming Thai boys' love (BL) drama television series directed by Pawanrat Naksuriya and starring Peerakrit Phacharaboonyakiat (Friend) and Thakhi Onglaor. The series is an original production of Channel 3 and will consist of eight episodes. It was initially announced under the title Dear Brother... I'm in Love with You. The series' official pilot had accumulated 460,000 views on YouTube as of August 2026.The series is scheduled to air on Channel 3 and stream on 3Plus in 2026.

== Premise ==
Krit, the polished CEO of a data analytics empire, has always put family and duty above his own heart. When a scandal linked to his ex-lover tarnishes his reputation, his controlling mother forces him into a fake marriage with Non, his adopted younger brother, who has secretly loved him for years.

What begins as a staged arrangement soon turns real as Non steps out of Krit's shadow and catches someone else's eye, awakening emotions Krit can no longer deny. But when their relationship sparks a public scandal, Krit must choose between protecting the perfect life he has built or risking everything for a love he never expected.

== Cast ==
=== Main ===
- Peerakrit Phacharaboonyakiat (Friend) as Non
- Thakhi Onglaor as Krit

== Production ==
The project was announced by Channel 3 as part of its 2026 programming slate under the title Dear Brother... I'm in Love with You, and was subsequently promoted as Decoding You (โคตรรัก). The series is part of the broadcaster's BEC World Original Series lineup. In March 2026, Channel 3 presented the series as a boys' love production starring Thakhi Kwin Onglaor and Friend Peerakrit Phacharaboonyakiat.

Filming for the series concluded on 21 July 2026, according to the production's official social media account. Decoding You will air on Channel 3. The series will consist of eight episodes, with an approximate runtime of 45 minutes each.
