= Chicha Amatayakul =

Thai actress and singer (born 1993)

- ชิชา อมาตยกุล
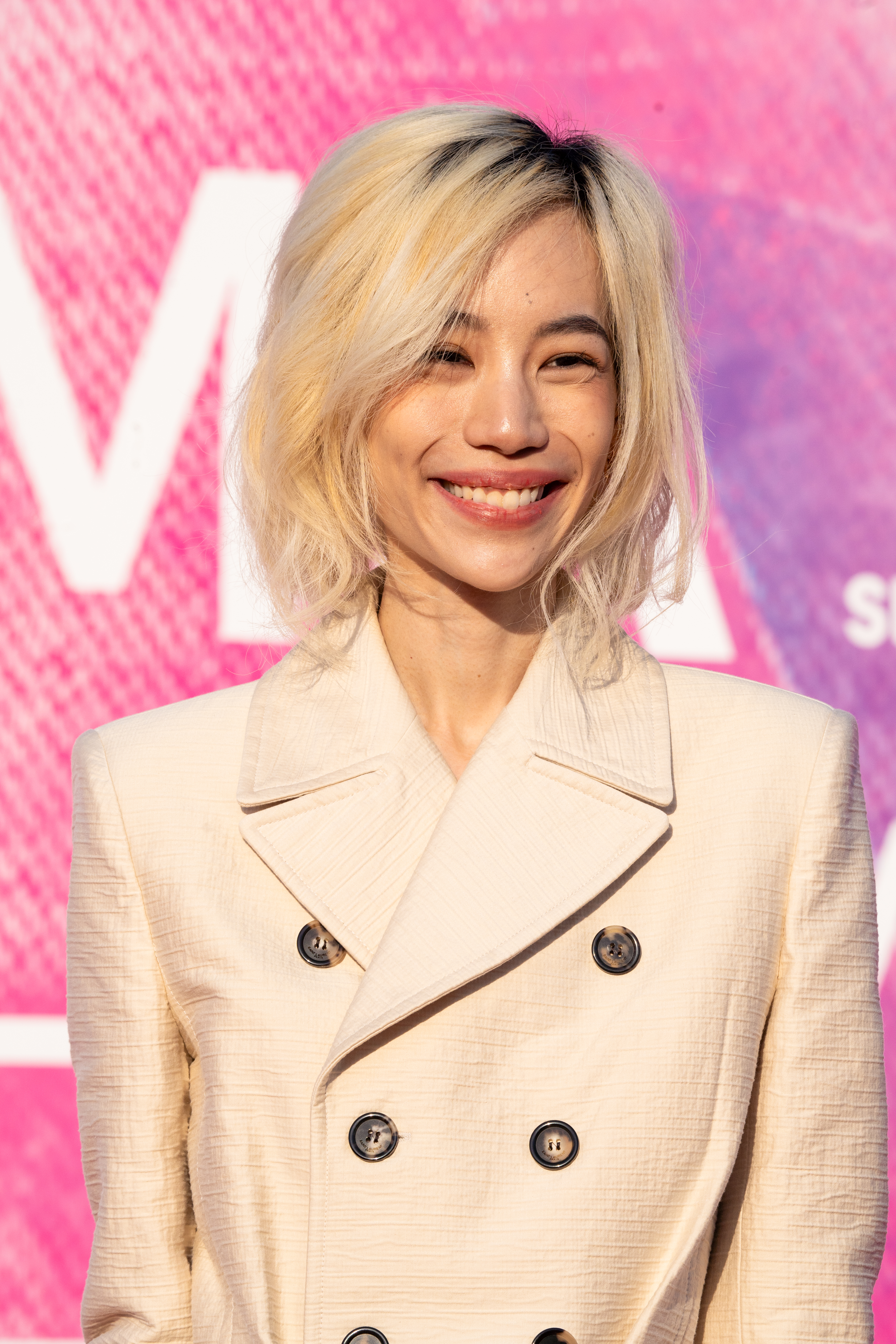
- Chicha at Yokohama International Film Festival in April 2024
- Born: Kanyawee Phumsiridol (Thai: กัลยวีร์ ภูมิสิริดล); 5 August 1993 (age 33); Bangkok, Thailand
- Other name: Shisha
- Education: Chitralada School, Bangkok; Assumption University; Ramkhamhaeng University
- Occupations: Actress; singer
- Years active: 2010–present
- Notable work: Girl From Nowhere (2018)
- Height: 1.7 m (5 ft 7 in)
- Musical career
- Genres: Pop
- Instrument: Vocals
- Label: Kamikaze (2010–2011)
- Formerly of: Kiss Me Five

Chicha Amatayakul (Thai: ชิชา อมาตยกุล, RTGS: Chicha Amatayakun; born 5 August 1993), born Kanyawee Phumsiridol and nicknamed Kitty, is a Thai actress and singer. She was a former member of the girl group Kiss Me Five from Kamikaze Records and best known for her role as Nanno in Netflix's anthology series Girl from Nowhere (2018–2021).

== Early life and education ==
Chicha was born on August 5, 1993. She attended Grade 4 at Chitralada School. She attended high school at an international school under the British Curriculum (IGCSE) at the age of 15 before entering higher education in the Faculty of Business at Assumption University and Faculty of Law at Ramkhamhaeng University.

== Career ==
In 2010, Chicha joined Kamikaze records as a member of the pop group Kiss Me Five, which also included the members Bow Maylada, Bam Pakakanya, Gail Natcha and Mild Krittiya.

Starting in 2018, Chicha starred as the main character, Nanno, in the drama anthology series Girl from Nowhere. The second season of Girl from Nowhere premiered on Netflix in 2021, exposing her to international audiences.

== Filmography ==
=== Television ===
Year	Program	Role	Note	Ref.
2013	ชาติเจ้าพระยา	Dujdao		
2013	จุดนัดภพ ปี 2ตอน สาวปากแดงตอน รักจุกอก	Saipan	Guest	
2013	ATM 2 คู่เวอร์เออเร่อเออรัก	Cookie		
2015	Love Blood จัดรักให้ตรงกรุ๊ป	Golf		
2015	รักนี้ผีคุ้มตอน พ่อหนูเป็นผี		Guest	
2015	รับแซ่บ My Boss	Pim		
2015	ปริศนาอาฆาต			
2015	สิงห์สี่แคว	Dujdao		
2015	Love Songs Love Stories เพลง คิดถึงฉันไหมเวลาที่เธอ...			
2016	กรุงเทพ..มหานครซ้อนรัก	Chicha	Guest	
2017	แหวนดอกไม้	Oum		
2018	หลงไฟ	I-Tim		
2018-2021	Girl from Nowhere	Nanno / Girl From Nowhere	2 seasons	
2020	เสียดาย	Pu		
2021	The Serpent	Suda Romyen		

=== Film ===
Year	Film	Role	Note	Ref.
2017	The Serpent's Song		Short film	
2017	เน็ต ไอ ดาย #สวยตายล่ะมึง!			
2019	จอมขมังเวทย์ 2020			
2019	โจรปล้นโจร			
2020	7 Boy Scouts (Nednari)			
2023	Rain Dancer	Pranpriya "Rain Dancer" Jongchapongvitee		

=== Music video appearances ===
Title in Thai	English Translation	Artist	Note	Ref.
"แฟน"	Girlfriend	Pae Arak Amornsupasiri		
"เมื่อคืน / Meua Keun"	Last Night	Season Five		
"คนไม่จำเป็น"	Unnecessary Person	Getsunova		
1-100		SOMKIAT		
"รักดี"	Good Love	NICECNX		
"ลืมกันแล้วหรือยัง"		25hours		
"เพื่อนเธอโคตรได้"	Your friend is f*cking good	BEN BIZZY & LAZYLOXY		
"ตราบ"	As long as	THE KEYLOOKZ		
"ให้เธอได้ฟัง"		New Mandarin		
"ถอนหายใจ"	Sigh	MILD		
"RADAR"		บุรินทร์ บุญวิสุทธิ์ Burin Boonvisut × TWOPEE Southside		
"ฉันยังหายใจอยู่"		FAHRENHEIT		
"ดอกไม้ในหนังสือหน้าที่ 75"		THE WHITEST CROW		
"ช่วงนี้/Chuang Nee"	This Moment/Recently/Lately	Nanno	Cover from Atom Chanakan's same titled song	
"สิ่งแทนใจ"	Representation	Retrospect		
