= Theethuch Khummuang =

Thai actor and singer (born 2005)

- ธีธัช คุ้มเมือง
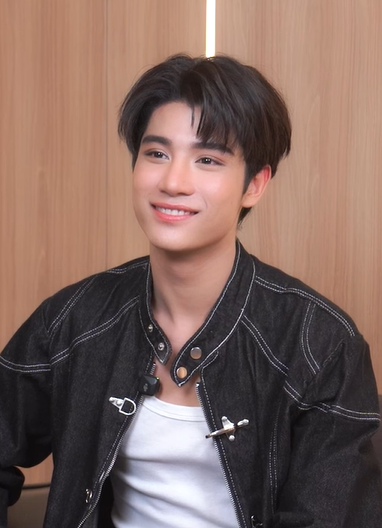
- Ongsa in 2026
- Born: 3 June 2005 (age 21); Lopburi province, Thailand
- Other name: Ongsa (องศา)
- Education: Chulalongkorn University
- Occupations: Actor; singer
- Years active: 2020–present
- Agent: A Entertainment
- Height: 1.80 m (5 ft 11 in)

Theethuch Khummuang (Thai: ธีธัช คุ้มเมือง; born 3 June 2005), nicknamed Ongsa (Thai: องศา), is a Thai actor and singer. He is best known for his roles as Siwat in The Cursed Love (2025) and Prince Tinnakorn in The Edge of Horizon (2026). Prior to his acting career, he participated in The Voice Kids in 2020.

== Early life and education ==
Ongsa was born on 3 June 2005 in Lopburi province, Thailand. He studied at the Demonstration School of Thepsatri Rajabhat University. In 2024, he enrolled in the Faculty of Communication Arts at Chulalongkorn University.

== Career ==
=== 2020–2024: Career beginnings ===
When he was fourteen, Ongsa met acting manager and producer Suppachai Srivijit (A), who was filming a video with Patcharapa Chaichua (Aum) in Lopburi. A Suppachai scouted Ongsa after seeing a video of him singing to his mother.

In 2020, Ongsa competed in the music program The Voice Kids Thailand, joining the team of singer Thanakrit Panichwid (Waan).

In December 2023, Ongsa released his first single "จดหมาย (Letter)" under A Entertainment and performed at the Siam Music Fest 2023.

=== 2025–present: The Cursed Love and The Edge of Horizon ===
In 2025, he made his acting debut in the lead role as Siwat in the fantasy boys' love series The Cursed Love, starring opposite Kittipon Tippayatayarut (Au). In addition to acting, he performed the series' theme song, "รักสาปสูญ (The Cursed Love)".

In 2026, he took on the lead role of Tinnakorn Varakulvathin in the historical BL drama The Edge of Horizon on One 31, starring alongside Jakkrasin Atsavatanachai (Inn).

== Discography ==
=== Singles ===
==== As lead artist ====
Year	Title	Ref.
2023	"จดหมาย (Letter)"	
2026	"แค่ได้พบเธอ (Last Wish)"	

==== Soundtrack appearances ====
Year	Title	Album	Ref.
2025	"รักสาปสูญ (The Cursed Love)"	The Cursed Love OST	
2026	"แสงแรก (First Light)"	The Edge of Horizon OST	
2026	"รักเธอเหลือเกิน (I Love You So Much)" (with Inn Jakkrasin)	The Edge of Horizon OST	

== Filmography ==
=== Television series ===
Year	Title	Role	Network	Notes	Ref.
2025	The Cursed Love	"Sin" Siwat Merton / Suriya / Peem	Channel 3	Main role	
2026	The Edge of Horizon	Prince Tinnakorn Varakulvathin	One 31	Main role	
TBA	คุณชายอนันตศัย Anantasaya: Our Love Stories		One 31	Main role	

=== Television show ===
Year	Title	Network	Notes
2020	The Voice Kids Thailand	PPTV HD 36	
2022	แฉ Chae	GMM 25	17 November 2022
2024	T-Pop Stage Show	Workpoint TV	18 January 2024
2025	แฉ Chae	GMM 25	13 November 2025
2026	โตมาเป็น Grow Up to Be	Asok Montri	Ep. 26
2026	Oum All Access	One 31	Ep. 18, 20, 23
2026	รอบวัน Rop Wan	One 31	Ep. 745 (29 June 2026), Ep. 759 (17 July 2026), Ep. 786 (27 August 2026)
2026	Spotlight 2026	One 31	Ep. 10 (4 July 2026)
2026	แฉ Chae	GMM 25	17 July 2026
2026	House 31	One 31	Ep. 3–4
2026	Route ดังองอิน	One Connection	
2026	4 Podum	One 31	Ep. 38 (30 September 2026)

== Awards and nominations ==
Award nominations for Theethuch Khummuang
Year	Award	Category	Nominee(s)	Result	Ref.
2026	Thailand Y Content Awards 2025	Best Series Soundtrack	"The Cursed Love"	Nominated	
2026	Thailand Y Content Awards 2025	Rising Star of the Year		Nominated	
