= Jakkrasin Atsavatanachai =

Thai actor (born 1997)

- จักราสินธุ์ อัศวธนะชัย
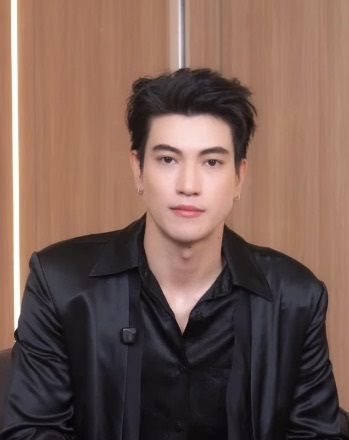
- Inn in 2026
- Born: 3 November 1997 (age 29); Thailand
- Other name: Inn (อิน)
- Education: Thammasat University
- Occupation: Actor
- Years active: 2025–present

Jakkrasin Atsavatanachai (Thai: จักราสินธุ์ อัศวธนะชัย; born 3 November 1997), nicknamed Inn (Thai: อิน), is a Thai actor. He is known for portraying Phakphum in The Wicked Game (2025), Prince Ekathotsarot in The Last Duel (2026), and Phopthee Mankhongphak in the historical BL series The Edge of Horizon (2026).

== Early life and education ==
Inn graduated from the International Program in Business English Communication at the Faculty of Liberal Arts, Thammasat University.

== Career ==
In 2025, Inn made his acting debut in the One31 action-romance series The Wicked Game, portraying Phakphum. The production marked his official debut as an actor under the network.

In 2026, he portrayed Prince Ekathotsarot in the historical drama The Last Duel, a series inspired by historical events from the Ayutthaya period.

Later that year, he landed his first leading role in BL television, starring opposite Theethuch Khummuang (Ongsa) in the historical BL series The Edge of Horizon.

== Discography ==
=== Singles ===
==== Soundtrack appearances ====
Year	Title	Album	Ref.
2026	"รักเธอเหลือเกิน (I Love You So Much)" (with Ongsa Theethuch)	The Edge of Horizon OST	

== Filmography ==
=== Television series ===
Year	Title	Role	Network	Notes	Ref.
2025	The Wicked Game	Phakphum	One 31	Supporting role	
2026	The Last Duel	Ekathotsarot	One 31	Main role	
2026	The Edge of Horizon	Phopthee Mankhongphak	One 31	Main role	
TBA	คุณชายอนันตศัย Anantasaya: Our Love Stories		One 31	Main role	

=== Television show ===
Year	Title	Network	Notes
2026	โตมาเป็น Grow Up to Be	Asok Montri	Ep. 26
2026	Oum All Access	One 31	Ep. 18, 20, 23
2026	รอบวัน Rop Wan	One 31	Ep. 745 (29 June 2026), Ep. 786 (27 August 2026)
2026	Spotlight 2026	One 31	Ep. 10 (4 July 2026)
2026	แฉ Chae	GMM 25	17 July 2026
2026	House 31	One 31	Ep. 3–4
2026	Route ดังองอิน	One Connection	
2026	4 Podum	One 31	Ep. 38 (30 September 2026)

== Events ==
Year	Date	Event	Venue	Notes
2025	24 September	The Wicked Game First Premiere	Siam Pavalai Royal Grand Theatre, Bangkok	Advance screening of the series premiere.
2025	1 November	The Wicked Game EP.6 Fan Screening	SF World Cinema, CentralWorld	Special fan screening event.
2025	29 November	The Wicked Game Final EP Fan Meeting	MCC Hall, Bangkok	Series finale event.
2026	11 March	The Last Duel EP.1 Exclusive Screening	SF World Cinema, CentralWorld	Advance screening of the series premiere.
2026	22 April	The Last Duel Final EP Fan Screening	Siam Pavalai Royal Grand Theatre, Bangkok	Series finale event.
2026	18 June	The Edge of Horizon Blessing Ceremony	GMM Grammy Place, Bangkok	Attended alongside the series' main cast.
2026	21 June	The Edge of Horizon World Premiere	Major Cineplex Ratchayothin, Bangkok	Official premiere event attended by the lead cast.
