= The Undertaker (nickname) =

The Undertaker is a nickname of:

- Mark William Calaway (born 1965), American professional wrestler
- Bill Baker (Canadian football) (born 1944), Canadian retired football player
- Vincent Brown (linebacker) (born 1965), American former National Football League player and current college coach
- Johnny Cash (1932–2003), American singer-songwriter, actor and author, early in his career
- Stefano Magaddino (1891–1974), Sicilian mafioso who became the boss of the Buffalo crime family in western New York
- Chris Walsh (American football) (born 1968), American retired National Football League player
