= G-Dragon in Cinema: Übermensch =

2025 South Korean concert film

- Theatrical release poster
- Directed by: Byun Jin Ho
- Starring: G-Dragon
- Cinematography: Kim Dong-hyun
- Edited by: Lee Ji-hoon
- Production companies: CJ ENM; CJ 4DPLEX; ScreenX Studio
- Distributed by: CJ ENM; CJ 4DPLEX
- Release date: October 29, 2025
- Running time: 105 minutes
- Country: South Korea
- Language: Korean
- Box office: $1.8 million

G-Dragon in Cinema: Übermensch Stylized as G-DRAGON IN CINEMA [ÜBERMENSCH]) is a 2025 South Korean concert film featuring South Korean singer-rapper G-Dragon.
