= Ghost Board =

- Directed by: Chanathip Wongpoltree
- Produced by: Visut Poolvaraluk
- Starring: Ongart Jeamcharoenpornkul; Panisara Rikulsurakan; Win Sakulsangprapha; Nattawat Sumploy; Neenara Boonnitipaisit; Pawat Ketsrisakda
- Release date: March 12, 2026

Ghost Board (Thai: กล่องผีสุ่มวิญญาณ) is a 2026 Thai horror–thriller film directed by Chanathip Wongpoltree. The story follows a group of teenagers who must confront ghosts and demons while playing a board game, fighting for survival before dawn. The film stars Ongart Jeamcharoenpornkul, Panisara Rikulsurakan, Win Sakulsangprapha, Nattawat Sumploy, Neenara Boonnitipaisit, and Pawat Ketsrisakda. It was first released on March 12, 2026.

== Plot ==
The story begins with a group of teenagers who are punished after being caught skipping school to play a board game and are sent to clean and practice meditation at a remote forest temple. During their activities, they accidentally discover an ancient board game hidden beneath the base of a Buddha statue in a deserted temple. When one of them inadvertently rolls the dice, the game immediately begins.

The only rule is that the players must finish the game before dawn. Each roll of the dice unleashes mysterious entities and malevolent spirits according to the outcome of the game. Their only chance of survival is to confront and overcome these entities before the game takes control and consumes them.

== Production ==
The film was adapted into an online game titled Ghost Board: Before Dawn on the Roblox gaming platform, developed by creators from Pall’s Studio. The game garnered over 700,000 plays within the first two weeks of its launch and attracted attention on social media.
