= Undertaking (band) =

- Origin: Budapest, Hungary
- Genres: Thrash metal
- Years active: 1988–1989
- Past members: György Killan; Viktor Jakab; Imre Esztári

Undertaking was a Hungarian thrash metal band formed in Budapest in 1988. The band consisted of György Killan (lead vocals, guitar), Viktor Jakab (bass guitar) and Imre Esztári (drums). Undertaking was active for only about a year, yet it became one of the most successful bands of the Hungarian thrash metal scene at the end of the 1980s. The members organized and ran the wildly popular monthly thrash metal event that operated under the banner of Thrash Mosh Club in Újpest (Budapest) at Ländler Jenő Művelődési Ház where they were the house band. The 7-song demo recorded in December 1988 titled V12BB4U and was distributed through mail order and small independent record shops. Singing in English made it next to impossible to have their music published through any official channels of the socialist Hungary of that era. Despite their popularity, Undertaking broke up at the end 1989 due to inner frictions. They played their last show at Vienna's Rockhaus opening for Rage.

A book (hard cover, 545p) documenting the band's brief existence set against the backdrop of rapidly changing social structure in Hungary at the close of the nineties, written (in Hungarian) by Ákos Dudich and Viktor Jakab, titled "Undertaking – Thrash metal Magyarországon a rendszerváltás idején" (in English: "Undertaking – Thrash metal in Hungary at the time of regime change") was published in 2017 and included a CD of the band's re-issued demo tape with some previously unpublished bonus material.

== History ==
=== Before Undertaking ===
Gyorgy Killan, born and raised in Kiev, Ukraine, where he received his rudimentary musical education and where his early forays into music included get-togethers with a couple of neighbourhood friends for loud noise making sessions on home-made instruments and calling themselves Children of Zeus, moved to Hungary in the mid-eighties and after a period of adjustment to the new life and learning the new language began his active pursuit of musical opportunities. He played guitar in a couple of local bands like Leopard and Metal Corpus with Zoltán “Pici” Fejes (who went on to found Classica). His self-recorded 1988 Killan demo tape received positive reviews (recording multiple instruments by himself bouncing tracks between two reel-to-reel tape decks was considered a novelty in those days) and brought some name recognition in the metal scene. His musical influences of the bands like Metallica, Kreator and above all Slayer as well as classical music can be heard in this demo.

Viktor Jakab, born in Miskolc, Hungary, had played in the local band Reaktor before moving to Budapest to attend the University of Economics. Killan met Jakab at a friend's band's rehearsal where Viktor was auditioning for the bass guitar spot and convinced him to join forces. Together they set off on a search of a drummer. Seeing Imre Esztári of Neckrofight play at a gig they were immediately impressed by his skill level and drumming style they recruited him on the spot.

After poaching Esztári from Neckrofight they began rehearsing as a band and adopted the name Undertaking.

=== Thrash Mosh Club ===
Logo of Undertaking Thrash Mosh Club

Ländler Jenő Cultural Centre was an underused Railroad Union Community Centre located in a run down area of Újpest (a North/West district of Budapest) next to the train tracks and a station, that had a concert hall with a proper stage and holding capacity of over a thousand. The band found a place to practice there and it soon became home of their monthly metal fest nights - Thrash Mosh Club - the first of its kind in the country.

Enlisting the marketing talents of Péter “Manitou” Somogyi, who has later become the band's manager and promotional skills of Zsolt "Gülü" Gürtler, they were able to consistently put on a full 5-6 hour program once a month, showcasing the latest metal music videos (projected on a large movie screen), doing contests and comedy skits, and finishing off with a live performance of several bands, with Undertaking, being the house band, as the closing act of the evening. The club's stage became a magnet for many local (and some foreign) metal bands contributing to the diverse and ever changing guest band line up, bands like Atomic, Pestilence, Almighty, The Bedlam, Beyond, Mirror, and many others.

In the pre-internet, pre-social media and pre-home computer era in Hungary all concert promotion had to be done the grass roots style - flyers and posters drawn by hand, band members and friends putting up posters and distributing flyers. One curious fact: several concert fliers and posters, as well as the Thrash Mosh Club logo were designed by a good friend of the band Zoltan Bathory, who was studying graphic design at the time and in more recent years has been touring the world with his own band Five Finger Death Punch (USA).

After the break up of Undertaking the Thrash Mosh Club organizers continued to put on isolated events for a few more years, but in the more recent times the concert hall was converted into a billiard hall and is now host to nationwide and international snooker tournaments.

=== V12BB4U demo and the Garázs compilation ===
Banking on the favourable currency exchange rates and on Killan's old music scene connections in his native Ukraine the band travelled to Kiev in December 1988 to record a 7-song demo (V12BB4U - read out with a thick Chinese or Russian accent it approximates "We Want To Be Before You").

The recording session took place at the Kiev's National Film Studios, which ordinarily recorded full orchestras for movie sound tracks. Due to the studio not being tailored to or having any experience recording metal, the resulting sound quality left much to be desired.

Despite the poor sound quality the demo was warmly received back home with several hundred copies sold through mail order and independent record shops within a few months and has since become a collector's item.

The Demo Tape featured the following tracks:

1. "Victim Of The Night" (orig. from Killan Demo) - a horror story "lullaby"
2. "Runner" (orig. from Killan Demo)
3. "Badinery" (cover of J. S. Bach)
4. "Viva Ceausescu" - a political shame-fest of a song
5. "Cool Before Drinking" - a phrase borrowed from a label of Russian vodka, the anti sobriety anthem
6. "Reactor #4" - a song about the ill-fated Chernobyl Nuclear Power Plant
7. "Evil Dwarf" - bonus live track

Garazs (Garage) was a compilation album of local indie bands - a brain child of Nagy Feró, at the time a well known rock musician and media persona with his own national radio show. Undertaking was offered a chance to submit a song for this LP. The album came out in 1989, but due to a mix-up (the master was submitted on a reel tape, with no time stamps the only way to identify the songs was to count them from the beginning) the wrong song (instead of "Reactor #4" as was printed on the label and jacket) "The Runner" was featured on it and the band's name was misprinted as "Undertacking".

=== Break-up ===
Undertaking disbanded in late 1989 with their last live performance in Vienna, Austria on 13 October 1989 opening for the Germany's Rage. Inner tensions and lack of commitment were cited as the main reasons.

== Members ==
- György Killan – lead vocals, guitar (1988-1989)
- Viktor Jakab – bass guitar (1988-1989)
- Imre Esztári – drums (1988-1989)

== Discography ==
- 1989 – V12BB4U (demo)
- 1989 – Garázs compilation (with the song titled "The Runner")
- 2017 – V12BB4U (remastered + bonus)
