= Flat Girls =

2025 Thai film by Jirassaya Wongsutin

- Theatrical release poster
- Thai: แฟลตเกิร์ล ชั้นห่างระหว่าง เ ร า
- Directed by: Jirassaya Wongsutin
- Written by: Jirassaya Wongsutin
- Produced by: Jira Maligool; Vanridee Pongsittisak; Pom Bunsermvicha; Suwimon Techasupinan; Yannassma Thannitsch
- Starring: Fatima Dechawaleekul; Kirana Pipityakorn; Pakorn Chatborirak
- Cinematography: Boonyanuch Kraithong
- Edited by: Asamaporn Samakphan; Chonlasit Upanigkit
- Music by: Jaithep Raroengjai
- Production company: Jor Kwang Films
- Distributed by: GDH 559
- Release date: 6 February 2025 (Thailand)
- Running time: 130 minutes
- Country: Thailand
- Language: Thai
- Box office: ฿4.25 million (Bangkok, Metropolitan & Chiang Mai)

Flat Girls (Thai: แฟลตเกิร์ล ชั้นห่างระหว่าง เ ร า, RTGS: Flat Girls Chan Hang Rawang Rao) is a 2025 Thai coming-of-age romance film written and directed by Jirassaya Wongsutin in her feature directorial debut. It stars Fatima Dechawaleekul, Kirana Pipityakorn, and Pakorn Chatborirak. Set in a Thai police flat complex, the film follows two teenage girls as their friendship is tested by class differences and budding romance. Produced and distributed by GDH 559, it was released in Thai theaters on 6 February 2025.

== Plot ==
In a police housing complex in Bangkok, teenage best friends Jane and Ann have grown up together since childhood. Jane comes from a financially comfortable family. Her father, Phong, is a high-ranking police officer, and her mother, Nee, runs an informal moneylending business inside the flats. Ann is the daughter of a low-ranking officer who died in the line of duty. She works part-time jobs to help her mother, Oom, support three younger siblings.

One day, while playing badminton, Jane and Ann's shuttlecock lands outside the apartment of Tong, a young police officer new to the complex. Nee asks Tong to look out for Jane and encourage her to exercise. Tong and Jane begin jogging together regularly, and Tong grows fond of her because she reminds him of his own daughter, who lives with his ex-wife. Meanwhile, Jane questions her sexuality and wonders if she has romantic feelings for Ann, though she feels nothing after trying to kiss her. Around the same time, police officials summon Ann's family to review their eligibility to live in the complex. Nee asks the local police captain to let them stay, though she advises Oom to prepare other housing options in case a future change in leadership forces them to leave.

Tensions rise when Jane tells Ann that her father plans to buy a house outside the complex, upsetting Ann at the thought of being separated. Ann goes alone to an empty unit next to Tong's apartment. When the unit's resident returns unexpectedly, Ann climbs onto Tong's balcony to hide. Tong comforts her, and the two start a secret romantic relationship.

Jane discovers the relationship after sneaking into Tong's apartment and finding Ann looking for her misplaced phone. As rumors about Tong and Ann spread through the complex, Oom pressures them to get married. Angry and frustrated, Ann smashes Nee's potted plants and runs to a nearby riverbank. Jane follows her and urges her not to marry Tong, saying it will keep her trapped in poverty and prevent her from building the better life she wants.

Later, Nee learns that Phong has a mistress and brings Jane along to confront him with a handgun in her purse. Outside Phong's new house, Jane convinces her mother to stand down and go home. Afterward, Jane gives Ann a ring from her mother and tells her to sell it to pay off Oom's debts. However, after Oom angrily blames Ann for not doing enough to support the family, Ann invites Jane on a boat ride. While they both close their eyes, Ann slips away and leaves the ring behind. Some time later, Jane leaves Ann a voicemail explaining that her parents have divorced and she is moving out of the police flats. She reminds Ann of a wish they once made to stay together forever and says that she misses her.

== Cast ==
- Fatima Dechawaleekul as Ann
- Kirana Pipityakorn as Jane
- Pakorn Chatborirak as Tong
- Wachirakon Raksasuwan as Nice
- Namfon Pakdee as Nee
- Suraphan Chaopaknam as Phong
- Kornpassorn Ratanameathanont as Oom
- Neennara Boonnithipaisit as Earng
- Alina M. Chang as Ink
- Pananyakorn Limvilairattana as Amy (1 year old)
- Punyanan Limvilairattana as Amy (2 years old)
- Phichai Prommate as Police Colonel

== Production ==
Flat Girls was announced during the GDH 559 lineup event in 2024. The project shares similarities with Wongsutin's earlier short film, She Is My Best Friend (Thai: เด็กสาวสองคนในสนามแบดมินตัน; 2012), which is also set in police flats and centers on two girls playing badminton, serving as an early precursor to the feature film.

Wongsutin drew on her own experiences of living in police housing until the age of thirty when writing the script. The film explores themes of adolescent alienation, sexuality, and coming of age through sports. According to Wongsutin, she also sought to examine the challenges of growing up female in a male-dominated environment, the role of women within police communities, bureaucratic hurdles, and socioeconomic instability in Thailand.

== Release ==
Flat Girls was released theatrically in Thailand on 6 February 2025. In its first four days, the film earned 2.6 million baht, recording the lowest opening-weekend gross in GDH's history. This fell below the previous studio low set by Fast & Feel Love (2022), which earned 2.92 million baht in the same timeframe. Flat Girls concluded its theatrical run with a total gross of 4.25 million baht, before becoming available for streaming on Netflix on 11 June 2025.
