= Nednari =

2023 Thai horror film

- Thai: อวสานเนตรนารี
- Directed by: Yuthlert Sippapak
- Written by: Yuthlert Sippapak
- Produced by: Thawatchai Phanpakdee; Yuthlert Sippapak; Pongsakorn Rasee-ngam
- Starring: Chicha Amatayakul; Nattawat Jirochtikul; Thakhi Onglaor; Bhurin Julnual; Teerasak Ruangsa; Takk Jungrungrit; Worapop Khongsangapharakchat
- Cinematography: Yuthlert Sippapak
- Edited by: Yuthlert Sippapak; Tawat Siripong
- Music by: Ittichet Chawang
- Distributed by: Hollywood (Thailand); Phranakorn Films
- Release date: 28 December 2023
- Running time: 95 minutes
- Country: Thailand
- Language: Thai

Nednari (Thai: อวสานเนตรนารี; RTGS: Awasan Netnari, lit. 'End [of the] Girl Scout'), formerly titled 7 Boy Scouts, is a 2023 Thai horror and political satire film directed by Yuthlert Sippapak. The film was released in Thai cinemas on 28 December 2023 and was produced by Phranakornfilm.

== Plot ==
The story follows a group of six teenage scouts, Thoo, Tae, Pom, Tape, Nu and Nooh, who become lost in an abandoned campsite. While they are pursued by a mysterious man, one of them, Pom, is injured. They gradually discover that the events are connected to something they did to a cat in the past. The arrival of a female scout adds another supernatural element to the events, while Mark attempts to help his friends. The film was inspired by the seven deadly sins and uses its story as a satirical representation of political events. The narrative also returns to the period when the characters were 15 years old, during their final camping trip.

== Cast and characters ==
- Chicha Amatayakul (Kitty) as Booh
- Nattawat Jirochtikul (Fourth) as Tae
- Thakhi Onglaor as Mark
- Bhurin Julnual as Thoo
- Teerasak Ruangsa as Pom
- Takk Jungrungrit as Nooh
- Worapop Khongsangapharakchat as Nu
- Suphakan Khwanmuang as Tape
- Chalee Immak as Booh's father
- Adirek Watleela as Lieutenant Uncle
- Somprasong Chiembunsom as Sergeant Pom

== Production ==
Nednari was directed by Yuthlert Sippapak, marking his 18th directorial work. The film was produced by Phranakornfilm, which resumed film production after a period of almost two years. The young cast was selected by the director himself and includes Thakhi Onglaor, Nattawat Jirochtikul, Phurin Chulanuan, Theerasak Rueangsa, Suphakan Khwanmuang, Woraphop Kongsangapharakchart and Thak Jungrungrit. The film received a 15+ age rating in Thailand and was released on 28 December 2023. The official trailer was released on YouTube on 8 December 2023.
