= Art of the Devil: Beginning =

- Directed by: Putthipong Saisrikaeo
- Written by: Peerasak Saksiri; Nattapoj Pojchamnian; Nattamon Phaethanom
- Production company: Five Star Production
- Distributed by: Five Star Production
- Release date: January 16, 2025
- Running time: 125 minutes
- Country: Thai
- Language: Thai

Art of the Devil: Beginning (Thai: พนอ) or Panor is a 2025 Thai psychological horror film, directed by Puttiphong Saisrikaeo, a co-director of Art of the Devil 2. The film stars Cherprang Areekul, Jackrin Kungwankiatichai, Rattanawadee Wongthong, Natthawat Thanattaweeprasert, and Nantawan Pongprasertsin, alongside Chanudom Suksatit, Chalita Suansane, Pijika Chittaputta, Jirakitt Suwanaphap, Kritchyos Lertprapai, and Sahatchai Chumrum. The film is a prequel of the Art of the Devil universe and is the third installment in the franchise. It tells the story of Panor’s life during her sixth year of secondary school, before she became a practitioner of black magic in Art of the Devil 3.

== Sequel ==
At a party celebrating box office earnings approaching 100 million baht, Five Star Production, as the producing company, announced a sequel titled Art of the Devil: Rebirth (Thai: พนอ 2) or Panor 2, starring Cherprang Areekul and Jackrin Kungwankiatichai. The film will depict the lives of Panor and Piak during their university years, with Putthipong Saisrikaeo returning as director, and is currently in the early stages of development.
