= The Undertaker (2023 Thai film) =

2023 Thai Isan-language film by Thiti Srinuan

- Film poster
- Directed by: Thiti Srinuan
- Written by: Thiti Srinuan
- Based on: Thibaan The Series by Surasak Pongsorn
- Produced by: Sachuch Boonkosum; Supanut Namwong; Surasak Pongson
- Starring: Chatchai Chinnasri; Sutida Buatik; Naruepol Yaiim; Atchariya Srita
- Cinematography: Krittideach Grajangsri
- Edited by: Chutipong Rakhorm; Thiti Srinuan; Phittaya Nitlarp
- Production company: Thibaan Studio Production
- Distributed by: Thibaan Studio and Movie Partner
- Release date: 5 October 2023
- Running time: 125 minutes
- Country: Thailand
- Language: Isan
- Budget: ฿10 million
- Box office: ฿245.1 million (Bangkok, Metropolitan & Chiang Mai) ฿729.6 million (nationwide)

The Undertaker or Supparor (Thai: สัปเหร่อ) is a 2023 Thai Isan-language supernatural horror comedy film, a spin-off of the 2017 series "Thibaan The Series", written and directed by Thiti "Tong-te" Srinuan starring by Chatchai Chinnasri, Sutida Buatik, Naruepol Yaiim, Atchariya Srita.

The film tells the story of the Isan (northeast region) folk way of life, using the regional Isan language throughout the story. It reflects some traditions or the local culture, including some ceremonies and beliefs, such as life after death and belief in ghosts and the supernatural.

== Synopsis ==
In the year 2022 at Non Khun village, Sisaket province, a pregnant woman named Baikhao hangs herself over love, which makes Siang, her ex-boyfriend who was ordained a monk, very sad and he leaves monkhood.

Meanwhile, Joed, another 25-year-old young man, who just graduated from law school in Bangkok, returns to his hometown to wait for the exam to become a lawyer. But then, his father Sak, a skilled undertaker, falls ill. Joed has to take on the role of undertaker in place of his father, even though he is a person who is extremely afraid of ghosts.

For unknown reasons, Baikhao's ghost suddenly goes on a rampage to haunt locals, creating fear throughout the village, but Siang is not afraid, on the contrary, he tries to meet her.

In order to see Baikhao's ghost, Siang has to perform an astral travel ritual which only Sak knows and can perform.

== Cast ==
=== Main ===
- Chatchai Chinnasri as Siang
- Sutida Buatik as Baikhao
- Atchariya Srita as Sak
- Naruepol Yaiim as Joed

=== Supporting ===
- Naraphat Ngodngam as Jack
- Natthawut Saenyabut as Lod
- Somchai Saiutha as Pong
- Phuwanet Seechomphu as Herb
- Thanadon Buarabat as Meud
- Kamthan Jindamon as Kamthan
- Chompumat Phongsanam as Prim
- Thiti Srinuan as Robert (cameo)
- Siriamol Onkoon as Doctor Plawan (cameo)
- Siripong Angkasakulkiat as Worker (cameo)

== Production and reception ==
The Undertaker is a 6th part and spin-off of the 2017 series "Thibaan The Series". The executive producers are two celebrities, Isan country singer Kong Huayrai and former MP Sisaket Siripong Angkasakulkiat.

The film received a lot of acclaim for being a low-budget product that became a huge box office success. From the release date (October 5, 2023) until the end of the same month, it grossed 500 million baht nationwide, making it the first Thai film in eight years to make such a profit, becoming a phenomenon in Thai film industry.

Until November 4, 2023 it is also the highest grossing film in Laos. By breaking the previous record of Avengers: Endgame and Avatar: The Way of Water.

Jaewrimjor, entertainment columnist for Thairath, named it the movie of the year.

== International release ==
The film was scheduled for release overseas as follows Malaysia on December 14, Vietnam on December 15, and Taiwan on December 22, respectively.
