= Thailand in the Eurovision Song Contest Asia =

Thailand in the Eurovision Song Contest Asia 2026
- Eurovision Song Contest Asia 2026
- Participating broadcaster: Channel 3
- Country: Thailand
- Selection process: Thailand's Chosen One
- Selection date: 27 September 2026

Competing entry
- Song: "Aroma"
- Artist: Mang and Daou
- Songwriters: Jaruwat Cheawaram; Nita Chavalit; Piyatida Lekklang; Vorapat Vongsukont; Worachet Thanupongcharat

Placement
- Final result: 2nd, 170 points

Participation chronology

Thailand was represented at the Eurovision Song Contest Asia 2026 with the song "Aroma", written by Jaruwat Cheawaram, Nita Chavalit, Piyatida Lekklang, Vorapat Vongsukont and Worachet Thanupongcharat, and performed by Lekklang under her stage name Mang alongside Daou. The Thai participating broadcaster, Channel 3, selected its entry for the contest through a national final. In addition, Channel 3 will serve as the host broadcaster and will stage the contest at One Bangkok Forum in Bangkok.

== Background ==
On 31 March 2026, the European Broadcasting Union (EBU) and Voxovation announced that the inaugural edition of the Eurovision Song Contest Asia would be held in Bangkok, Thailand, on 14 November 2026, hosted by Channel 3; with the broadcaster, representing Thailand, also named as one of ten provisional participants. On 4 August, it was announced that Channel 3 would select its entry for the contest through Thailand's Chosen One.

== Before Eurovision Asia ==
=== Thailand's Chosen One ===
Thailand's Chosen One logo

==== Format ====
Channel 3 selected its entry for the Eurovision Song Contest Asia 2026 through the national final Thailand's Chosen One. The contest had a five-member jury consisting of Pu Blackhead, Kru Ouan, Rudklao Amratisha, Tan Lipta, and Boy Peacemaker.

==== Competing acts ====
On 19 August 2026, the 10 competing artists were announced.

Thailand's Chosen One participants
Artist	Song	Songwriter(s)	Ref.
Gam Wichayanee	"Wichayanee" (วิชญาณี)	Panthapol Prasarnrajkit	
Jetset'er	"Oh Yeah"	Titsadee Srimuang	
JMNK	"Nonchalant"	Achariya Dulyapaiboon	
Mang & Daou	"Glinratree (Aroma)" (กลิ่นราตรี)	Jaruwat Cheawaram; Nita Chavalit; Piyatida Lekklang; Vorapat Vongsukont; Worachet Thanupongcharat	
Monica	"Kongkruankoi" (คงครวญคอย)	Jenjira Chiang-ek	
Retrospect	"Suriyuprakhon (Eclipse)" (สุริยุปราคน)	Jirayu La-ongmanee; Thanapon Srikanjana; Noppawat Kachacheewa; Sutthiphan Sangyuth; Tunwa Ketsuwan	
Tigger and Tara Viis	"Faded Ink"	Achira Theriault; Tara Anantara Gibson	
Wonderframe	"Girlslikegirls"	34Risk; Kyler Niko; William Aherne; Supakchaya Sukbaiyen	
Zom Marie	"Khor Fun (Wish)" (ขอฝัน)	Marie Eugenie Le Lay; Vasawat Panyaratwong	
D Gerrard (Note: D Gerrard was originally announced as a masked competitor named The Handsome Wolf.)	"I'm Just Lucky"	Brian Gerrard Ukrit Willi Brod Don Gabriel; Kittipong Jaihaw	

==== Contest overview ====
The final was held on 27 September 2026 at 18:00 ICT. The show was hosted by K. Nui Sujira and DJ Nui. The interval act was Sek Loso performing "Don't Look Back In Anger".

Thailand's Chosen One final
R/O	Artist	Song	Place
1	Wonderframe	"Girlslikegirls"	
2	Retrospect	"Suriyuprakhon (Eclipse)"	
3	Monica	"Kongkruankoi"	
4	JMNK	"Nonchalant"	
5	Jetset'er	"Oh Yeah"	
6	Tigger and Tara Viis	"Faded Ink"	
7	Mang & Daou	"Glinratree (Aroma)"	Winner
8	Zom Marie	"Khor Fun (Wish)"	
9	Gam Wichayanee	"Wichayanee"	2/3
10	D Gerrard	"I'm Just Lucky"	2/3

== At Eurovision Asia ==
Mang and Daou at Eurovision Song Contest Asia

The Eurovision Song Contest Asia took place at the One Bangkok Forum in Bangkok on 14 November 2026.

The contest attracted 400.000 viewers on Channel 3 in average.

=== Performance ===
On the evening of the final in Bangkok, Thailand performed 8th in the running order, following Bangldaesh and preceding Nepal. At the close of voting, "Aroma" had received 170 points from the other participating countries, with 62 points from the juries, and 108 points from the online vote, finishing in 2nd place overall, becoming the runner up behind the eventual winner, the Philippines. The Thai jury awarded its own 12 points to Vietnam.

=== Voting ===
Points awarded to Thailand
Score	Country
12 points	
10 points	
8 points	Bangladesh; Nepal; Philippines; South Korea
7 points	Bhutan
6 points	Mongolia
5 points	Laos; Malaysia; Vietnam
4 points	
3 points	
2 points	Cambodia
1 point	
Thailand received 108 points from the online vote.

Points awarded by Thailand
Score	Country
12 points	Vietnam
10 points	Malaysia
8 points	South Korea
7 points	Laos
6 points	Philippines
5 points	Mongolia
4 points	Nepal
3 points	Bhutan
2 points	Bangladesh
1 point	Cambodia

== Participation overview ==
Table key
2	Second place
†	Upcoming event

Participation history
Year	Artist	Song	Language	Final	Points
2026	Mang & Daou	"Aroma"	Thai	2	170

== Hostings ==
Year	Location	Venue	Presenters
2026	Bangkok	One Bangkok Forum	Woody Milintachinda and Cindy Bishop
