= Bae (word) =

Slang English language term of endearment

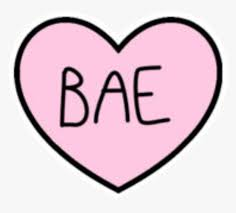
The word "BAE" encircled around a heart symbol

Bae (/beɪ/ BAY) is a slang term of endearment, primarily used among youth. It came into widespread use around the 2010s through social media and hip-hop and R&B lyrics. The term originated as an abbreviation of the word baby or babe. It has been suggested that the term originated as an acronym for "before anyone else"; this is unlikely and a false etymology that is probably an example of a backronym.

== Popular use ==
Several Internet memes have caused the widespread adoption of the term. "Bae caught me slippin'" featured people posting pictures of themselves pretending to be asleep that were supposedly taken by their partners. Lexicographer Grant Barrett wrote that this was "a kind of incompetent narcissistic guile which may capture the spirit of our age". "Cooking for bae" featured people posting photos of failed dishes, often called "struggle meals", supposedly created for their partners. "You got a bae? Or nah?" originated on Vine and featured people chanting the phrase.

The word's use in song lyrics dates to at least 2004, featuring in JoJo’s hit "Leave (Get Out)". In 2014, Pharrell Williams used it in the title of his single "Come Get It Bae". Chris Kelly of Fact wrote sarcastically that "nothing says timeless like a song with 'bae' in the title." The word was a runner-up for the Oxford Dictionaries 2014 Word of the Year. Barrett nominated it for the American Dialect Society's 2013 Word of the Year. The term has been adopted by corporate social media. The Twitter account Brands Saying Bae highlights the use of corporate Twitter accounts employing the term. The Verge labeled this use as an "appropriation of urban youth culture".

Thinla will represent Laos at the Eurovision Song Contest Asia 2026 with the song "Bae".

== See also ==
- Slang
