= Mang (singer) =

Thai singer (born 2000)

Mang มาง
- Mang in 2026

Background information
- Born: Piyatida Lekklang; 3 May 2000 (age 26)
- Genre: Thai pop
- Occupation: Singer
- Years active: 2021–present
- Label: LIT Entertainment
- Member of: Bamm

Piyatida Lekklang (Thai: ปิยธิดา เล็กกลาง; born 3 May 2000), known mononymously as Mang (Thai: มาง), is a Thai singer. She debuted as a member of the co-ed group Bamm in April 2021. Mang debuted as a solo singer in September 2024 with the digital single "Stay Strong". She represented Thailand for the inaugural Eurovision Song Contest Asia on home soil with the song "Aroma" alongside Daou.

== Career ==
On 1 January 2021, Mang was introduced as a trainee under LIT Entertainment. On 17 March, she was introduced as a member of the co-ed group Bamm. She debuted with them on 1 April, with the release of their debut single "2cool2care" ("โดนเทแต่เท่อยู่"). On 16 September 2024, LIT announced that Mang would make her solo debut with her single "Stay Strong" ("เจ็บก็สิอดเอา"), which was released three days later.

On 19 August 2026, the duo of Mang and Daou was one of ten competing artists selected for the Thailand's Chosen One with the song "Aroma". They won the competition on 27 September, earning them the right to represent Thailand in the Eurovision Song Contest Asia 2026 in Bangkok, Thailand, in November. Both of them eventually finished second behind Philippines' Carmelle, garnering a total of 170 points, 41 points behind the winner.

== Discography ==
=== Singles ===
==== As lead artist ====
List of singles as lead artist, showing year released and album name
Title	Year	Album
"Stay Strong"	2022	Non-album singles
"Aroma" (with Daou)	2026	Non-album singles

Awards and achievements
Preceded by None	Thailand in the Eurovision Song Contest Asia (with Daou); 2026	Succeeded by TBD
