= Chukha =

Chukha may refer to:

- Chukha District, a district in Bhutan
  - Mebisa, Bhutan, capital of the district and formerly called Chukha
- Chokha, a Caucasian item of clothing
