= Malaysia in the Eurovision Song Contest Asia =

Malaysia in the Eurovision Song Contest Asia 2026
- Eurovision Song Contest Asia 2026
- Participating broadcaster: Media Prima
- Country: Malaysia
- Selection process: Internal selection
- Announcement date: Artist: 15 August 2026; Song: 9 October 2026

Competing entry
- Song: "Bluest Sky"
- Artist: Aina Abdul
- Songwriters: Nurul Aina Abdul Ghani

Placement
- Final result: 4th, 152 points

Participation chronology

Malaysia was represented at the Eurovision Song Contest Asia 2026 with the song "Bluest Sky", written and performed by Aina Abdul. The Malaysian participating broadcaster, Media Prima, internally selected its entry for the contest.

== Background ==
On 31 March 2026, alongside the official announcement of the Eurovision Song Contest Asia 2026, Malaysian broadcaster Media Prima was announced as one of ten provisional participants, representing Malaysia.

== Before Eurovision Asia ==
On 4 August 2026, it announced that Media Prima would not hold a dedicated show to select its entry for the contest and would instead reveal its representative on 15 August during the 40th edition of the annual music competition Anugerah Juara Lagu, broadcast on TV3. One of the show's ten participants, Aina Abdul, was revealed as the selected entrant. On 16 August, Media Prima announced that Abdul's journey towards the contest would be documented in a special television series titled Malaysia Memburu Impian ("Malaysia Pursues Its Dream").

== At Eurovision Asia ==
Aina Abdul at Eurovision Song Contest Asia 2026 in Bangkok.

The Eurovision Song Contest Asia took place at the One Bangkok Forum in Bangkok on 14 November 2026.

On the evening of the final in Bangkok, Malaysia performed 11th in the running order, following Nepal.

=== Performance ===
Aina performed alone on stage, behind a prop that appears to be a transparent glass or acrylic structure with a rippling water effect. For her performance, Aina is wearing a monochromatic white ensemble – designed by Melinda Looi – featuring a hijab and an oversized blazer with wide sleeves.

=== Voting ===
At the close of voting, "Bluest Sky" had received 152 points from the other participating countries, with 82 points from the juries, and 70 points from the online vote, finishing in 4th place overall. The Malaysian jury awarded its own 12 points to the Bhutan, who placed 6th.

Points awarded to Malaysia
Score	Country
12 points	Mongolia; Philippines
10 points	Laos; South Korea; Thailand
8 points	Cambodia
7 points	Nepal
6 points	Bhutan
5 points	
4 points	Bangladesh
3 points	Vietnam
2 points	
1 point	
Malaysia received 70 points from the online vote.

Points awarded by Malaysia
Score	Country
12 points	Bhutan
10 points	Nepal
8 points	Mongolia
7 points	Cambodia
6 points	Vietnam
5 points	Thailand
4 points	Laos
3 points	Philippines
2 points	South Korea
1 point	Bangladesh

==== Detailed voting results ====
The following members comprised the Malaysian jury:

- AG Coco (jury chairperson) – Music producer, composer
- Justin Seow – Music producer, composer
- Iman Tang – Event manager and concert promoter
- Bobby Husaini – Commercial and film director
- Shamshul Azree Samshir – Senior Entertainment News Editor and Projects Editor at Berita Harian

== Participation overview ==
Table key
†	Upcoming event

Participation history
Year	Artist	Song	Language	Final	Points
2026	Aina Abdul	"Bluest Sky"	English, Malay	4	152
