= Bluest Sky =

2026 single by Aina Abdul

Single by Aina Abdul
- Language: English; Malay
- Released: 9 October 2026
- Recorded: 2026
- Studio: Calvary Studio (Kuala Lumpur)
- Genre: Pop; Ballad
- Length: 2:58
- Label: Aina Abdul Entertainment; Alternate Records; Sony Music Entertainment Malaysia
- Songwriter: Aina Abdul
- Producers: Aina Abdul; Mac Chew

Aina Abdul singles chronology
"Sadis" (2026)	"Bluest Sky" (2026)

Music video
- "Bluest Sky" on YouTube

Audio sample
- file; help

Eurovision Song Contest Asia 2026 entry
- Country: Malaysia

Finals performance
- Final result: 4th
- Final points: 152

Official performance video
- "Bluest Sky" on YouTube

"Bluest Sky" is a song by Malaysian singer-songwriter Aina Abdul. It was released on 9 October 2026 by Aina Abdul Entertainment, Alternate Records and Sony Music Entertainment Malaysia. The song was written by Aina and produced by herself and Mac Chew. It represented Malaysia in the Eurovision Song Contest Asia 2026, where it placed 4th.

== Background and recording ==
On 15 August 2026, Malaysian company Media Prima announced Aina Abdul as its representative for the Eurovision Song Contest Asia 2026 during the 40th edition of Anugerah Juara Lagu, an annual music competition broadcast on TV3.

Aina began writing numerous songs for the competition. Describing the process, Aina said, "After the 40th Anugerah Juara Lagu (AJL40), my mind was entirely focused on Eurovision. I suffered many sleepless nights because I was busy creating a substantial number of songs." She eventually selected "Bluest Sky" for recording because she felt it was suited to the competition.

Music arrangement session for "Bluest Sky".

Aina produced the song with her frequent collaborator Mac Chew, who also arranged it. Wan Gigi played guitar and gambus, while Mohar Mohram contributed the seruling part. The song also features strings performed by the International Chief Philharmonic Orchestra Beijing. Production took approximately a month to complete, including a 10-hour recording session, and involved moving between studios in Seremban and Kuala Lumpur in search of the right sound. The song was mixed and mastered by Guy Gray at Water Tower Studios, Brisbane, Australia.

== Composition and lyrics ==
"Bluest Sky" was written in English to reach a wider audience and international market. The song incorporates Malaysian and Nusantara musical elements, featuring instruments such as the gambus, tabla and seruling. The song runs for 2 minutes and 58 seconds, a length Aina said was chosen to meet Eurovision's three-minute performance limit.

Aina described the song as a love letter to someone she sees as her "bluest sky". Its lyrics explore love, heartbreak and uncertainty, with a message of hope that even the deepest sadness will eventually pass. During the television series Malaysia Memburu Impian, she revealed that the song was dedicated to her cat, Hiro, which died while she was preparing for the 40th edition of Anugerah Juara Lagu. She said, "The lyrics, especially the first verse, are about Hiro." She also explained that a video of Hiro pressing a few notes on the piano inspired her to write the song.

== Promotion and release ==
On 6 October 2026, Aina revealed the title of her new single, "Bluest Sky", on Instagram. An exclusive listening session for the song was held at RexKL in Kuala Lumpur on 8 October 2026, featuring a performance of the song. The single was released on digital platforms on 9 October 2026. It was officially selected to represent Malaysia in the Eurovision Song Contest Asia 2026, which is scheduled to take place in Bangkok, Thailand, on 14 November 2026. Beginning in October 2026, TV3 aired Malaysia Memburu Impian, a special segment featured in several episodes of its television show Melodi, following Aina's journey to Eurovision Asia.

== Music video ==
Directed by Chuan Looi, the music video for "Bluest Sky" was released on 14 October 2026 through Aina Abdul's official YouTube channel. The black dress Aina wears in the video was designed by Melinda Looi and inspired by the black betta fish. In an Instagram post, Looi described the design as highlighting the contrast between darkness and light, serving as a reminder that beauty can emerge during the darkest times.

The music video opens with a shot of a beach, followed by scenes of Aina Abdul walking along the shoreline in a black dress while holding a flaming torch. These scenes are interspersed with shots of Aina and the surrounding beach landscape. She later approaches a painting placed on the beach and sets it on fire before throwing the torch away. The video ends with a shot of the painting's frame remaining unburned.

== Eurovision Song Contest Asia 2026 ==
The Eurovision Song Contest Asia 2026 took place at the One Bangkok Forum in Bangkok, Thailand, on 14 November 2026. Aina performed as the 11th and final act of the competition.

Her dress for the performance, designed by Melinda Looi, featured shimmering white, turquoise blue and translucent tones, with sculptural water splashes, cascading crystal droplets and a flowing cape. In an interview with The Star, Looi said that its creation took 600 hours to complete and involved intricate hand embellishment and approximately 20 kg of crystal-clear glue, which was fashioned into hundreds of delicate water-droplet formations. She added that the droplets, along with clear gemstones and glass beads, were painstakingly hand-painted in varying shades of blue. The gown also featured hundreds of thousands of Swarovski crystals. It was accompanied by a three-metre-long cape and train, made from layers of organza and supported by 200 metres of wire.

Aina's performance featured a water-themed concept, supported by a giant water droplet prop and dynamic LED visuals. The stage presentation transformed from a single droplet into surging waves. Aina received 82 points from the professional jury and 70 points from the public vote, giving her a total of 152 points and placing her fourth in the competition.

Anwar Ibrahim, the prime minister of Malaysia, congratulated Aina on her achievement. In a statement, he said, "Malaysia remains proud of Aina and her team for bringing honour to the country on the international stage. Keep soaring, Aina!".

== Credits and personnel ==
- Aina Abdul – vocals, songwriting, production
- Mac Chew – arranger, production
- Wan Gigi - guitars, gambus
- Mohar Mohram - seruling
- International Chief Philharmonic Orchestra Beijing - strings
- Guy Gray – mastering, mixing
- Zakaria Mahadi – recording engineer

== Release history ==
Region	Date	Format	Label
Various	9 October 2026	Digital download, streaming	Aina Abdul Entertainment; Alternate Records; Sony Music Entertainment Malaysia
