= Sojeong Shim =

Sojeong Shim 심소정
- Born: Wonju, South Korea
- Occupations: Singer-songwriter; harpist
- Instruments: Vocals; harp
- Years active: 2018–present (as singer-songwriter)

Sojeong Shim (Korean: 심소정, romanized: Shim So-jeong) is a South Korean singer-songwriter and harpist.

== Early life and education ==
Shim was born in Wonju, South Korea. She is the granddaughter of Korean independence activist Shim Jae-young. After completing elementary school, she moved to Seoul. Having studied piano and violin during her childhood, she began taking harp lessons while preparing for an entrance exam to an arts middle school, which led her to pursue music professionally.

She subsequently graduated from Yewon School and Seoul Arts High School before studying at Seoul National University's College of Music. Her further education included a master's degree in harp performance and literature at the Eastman School of Music and doctoral coursework in arts at Sungkyunkwan University.

== Career ==
Shim has performed with several orchestras, including the Seoul Philharmonic Orchestra, the Seoul Royal Symphony Orchestra and the National Symphony Orchestra of Radio Moldova. She began her career as a singer-songwriter in 2018. After studying the harp abroad, she returned to South Korea in 2020.

She co-authored My Angel Mini Harp (Korean: 마이엔젤 미니하프), an instructional book series published by Sekwang Music Publishing in February 2022. In March 2022, she founded the International Harp Association with the aim of promoting harp music and has since served as its director. She has performed at several major South Korean concert venues, such as the Seoul Arts Center, the Lotte Concert Hall and the Bucheon Arts Center. In August 2022, she released her debut instrumental extended play (EP), Sweetheart, which featured six harp arrangements. Between 2022 and 2023, she also released music under the stage name Selyn.

In November 2025, she released her debut EP as a vocalist, Reborn Hearts. In August 2026, she was announced among the participants of Korea's Next Wave, the South Korean national final for the Eurovision Song Contest Asia 2026, with the song "Eheradiya". She finished second in the final held on 4 September.

== Discography ==
=== Extended plays ===
List of extended plays
Title	EP details
Sweetheart	Release date: 16 August 2022; Label: RiversideJazz; Formats: Digital download, streaming
Reborn Hearts	Release date: 19 November 2025; Label: Sound Alliance; Formats: Digital download, streaming, CD

=== Singles ===
List of singles
Title	Year
"The Moon on a Rainbow"	2018
"Sweet My Spring"	2019
"Close Enough"	2019
"Love Tattoo"	2020
"Northern Star" (as Selyn)	2022
"Never and Always" (as Selyn)	2023
"Winter Blossom"	2025
"Runaway"	2026
"Like a Dream"	2026
"Velvet Sky"	2026
"Perfect Timing"	2026
"Eheradiya" (에헤라디야)	2026

==== As featured artist ====
List of singles as featured artist
Title	Year
"L’atelier" (Sungha Jung featuring Sojeong Shim)	2026
