= AJAA =

Filipino boy band

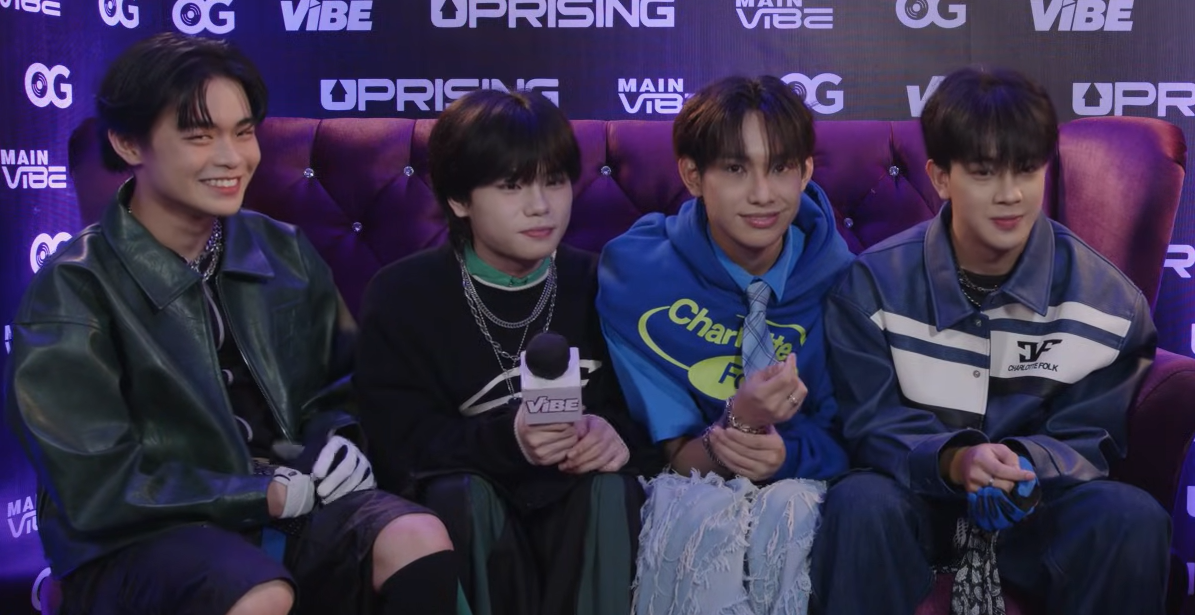
- AJAA in 2025 (left to right): JC, Alex, Axl, Ash

Background information
- Origin: Manila, Philippines
- Genres: Pinoy pop
- Years active: 2023–present
- Labels: Cornerstone; Republic Philippines; StarPop
- Members: Ash; JC; Axl; Alex
- Website: Official website

AJAA is a Filipino boy band formed in 2023 by Cornerstone Entertainment. The group consists of four members: Ash, JC, Axl, and Alex. They debuted in September 2023 with the extended play (EP) 4 Ü.

== Name ==
The group's name, AJAA, is derived from the first letters of the members' names: Ash, JC, Axl, and Alex. It is also a reference to the Korean phrase "Aja" (아자), which translates to "fighting" or an expression of good luck.

== History ==
=== Pre-debut and formation ===
Before the group was formed, members Ash and JC participated in the reality survival show Top Class. Ash was eliminated during the competition, while JC reached the finale but did not make the final lineup. Axl established a following on social media through dance covers on TikTok, while Alex appeared in television commercials and short films. The members trained for over a year under Cornerstone Entertainment.

=== 2023: Debut with 4 Ü ===
AJAA made their official debut on September 7, 2023. They were signed to Cornerstone Entertainment and Republic Records Philippines. Their debut media launch was held at Ayala Malls Manila Bay.

The group released their first EP titled 4 Ü in 2023. The EP contains four tracks: "Hany", "Best Day Ever", "Cuppy Cake", and "Torpe". The members contributed to the production of the EP, with writing credits on the track "Cuppy Cake". Franz Chua of the group VXON also co-wrote two songs on the album. Shortly after their debut, the group performed at the "Best of K-Beauty" festival at the SM Mall of Asia in September 2023.

=== 2024: "Bes I Luv U" and awards ===
In 2024, AJAA released the single "Bes I Luv U". The song was included in the "P-pop On The Rise" playlist on Spotify. The group won the title of "Best Rookie P-Pop Group" at the 2024 Big Bold Brave Awards.

In June 2024, the group participated in the "Style Conquest 2024" fashion show held at the Green Sun Hotel in Makati. They also performed at the Billboard Philippines: Mainstage event in October 2024 to celebrate their first anniversary.

=== 2025: "Dedma" and "Ako Na" ===
AJAA released the single "Dedma" on February 28, 2025. It is described as a pop-funk track. Following this release, the group held their first fan meeting titled "Best Day Ever" on May 30, 2025. The event took place at the Teatrino in Greenhills, San Juan City. During the fan meeting, members performed solo covers and the group teased a new single.

On September 26, 2025, AJAA released the single "Ako Na". This marked their first release under the ABS-CBN record label, StarPop. The song was co-written and produced by Franz Chua, Jhon Carl Maniacop, and Theo Martel. AJAA member JC also contributed to the songwriting for this track.

=== 2026: Philippine Selection Night ===
On July 31, 2026, the group released their second EP titled 4:ÜS. The EP contains six tracks: "KAKABAKABA", "Game Over", "Lala Na", "Kapit", "Freaky" and the pre-release single "Ako Na". Of the six tracks, AJAA member JC contributed to the songwriting of the four tracks, two being co-written by members Ash and Alex, one being co-written by Axl, and Franz Chua of the group VXON co-wrote five tracks on the album.

On 11 August 2026, it was announced that AJAA would participate in Philippine Selection Night, Philippines' selection for Eurovision Song Contest Asia 2026, with the song "Make It Exist". The group did not advance from the national selection.

== Members ==
- Ash – lead vocalist.
- JC – Leader and Main dancer.
- Axl – Main vocalist.
- Alex – Main rapper. Alex is the youngest member of the group, having joined the industry at age 13.

== Discography ==
=== Extended plays ===
Title	Album details
4 Ü	Released: September 7, 2023; Label: Cornerstone Entertainment, Republic Records Philippines; Format: Digital download, streaming
4:ÜS	Released: July 31, 2026; Label: Cornerstone Entertainment, ABS-CBN Music; Format: Digital download, streaming

=== Singles ===
Title	Year	Album
"Hany"	2023	4 Ü
"Best Day Ever"	2023	4 Ü
"Cuppy Cake"	2023	4 Ü
"Torpe"	2023	4 Ü
"Bes I Luv U"	2024	Non-album singles
"Dedma"	2025	Non-album singles
"Ako Na"	2025	4:ÜS
"KAKABAKABA"	2026	4:ÜS
"Game Over"	2026	4:ÜS
"Lala Na"	2026	4:ÜS
"Kapit"	2026	4:ÜS
"Freaky"	2026	4:ÜS
"Make It Exist"	2026	Philippine Selection Night

== Awards and nominations ==
Year	Award Ceremony	Category	Result	Ref.
2024	Big Bold Brave Awards	Best Rookie P-Pop Group	Won	
