= Vietnam in the Eurovision Song Contest Asia =

Vietnam in the Eurovision Song Contest Asia 2026
- Eurovision Song Contest Asia 2026
- Participating broadcaster: Vietnam Television (VTV)
- Country: Vietnam
- Selection process: Artist: Internal selection Song: The Sound of Vietnam
- Selection date: Artist: 16 September 2026; Song: 3 October 2026

Competing entry
- Song: "Em Tiên"
- Artist: Tóc Tiên
- Songwriters: Trần Thị Thu Hà; Phạm Khánh Dương

Placement
- Final result: 3rd, 164 points

Participation chronology

Vietnam was represented at the Eurovision Song Contest Asia 2026 with the song "Em Tiên", written by Trần Thị Thu Hà and Phạm Khánh Dương, and performed by Tóc Tiên. The Vietnamese participating broadcaster, Vietnam Television (VTV), internally selected Tóc Tiên as its representative and organised the national final The Sound of Vietnam to determine its entry for the contest. The song ultimately placed third in the contest with 164 points.

== Background ==
The European Broadcasting Union's first attempt to adapt the Eurovision Song Contest for the Asia-Pacific region, announced in 2008 under the title Our Sound – The Asia Pacific Song Contest, listed Vietnam among the countries expressing interest. In August 2025, Ho Chi Minh City Television (HTV), which serves Vietnam's Ho Chi Minh City, had allocated a timeslot for a programme titled Eurovision Asia on 31 August. After Eurovision Song Contest director Martin Green stated that "no plans have been confirmed or announced to date" for a Eurovision Asia, in response to the Bhutan Broadcasting Service's premature organisation of a national final for a Bhutanese entry, HTV's timeslot was subsequently altered to be for a 2017 French documentary on Eurovision. The inaugural edition of Eurovision Asia was officially announced on 31 March 2026, with Vietnam, represented by Vietnam Television (VTV) as the participating broadcaster, listed among the initial ten competing countries.

== Before Eurovision Asia ==
=== Artist selection ===
In early September 2026, multiple Vietnamese news outlets reported that Tóc Tiên had been internally selected to represent Vietnam at Eurovision Asia. This was confirmed on 16 September, ahead of a press conference organised by VTV and Dao Music Entertainment to announce the national final format The Sound of Vietnam (Vietnamese: Thanh âm Việt Nam), which would select Tóc Tiên's entry for the contest.

=== The Sound of Vietnam ===
The Sound of Vietnam logo

The Sound of Vietnam consisted of a single show on 3 October 2026, held at Zoom Media's studios in Ho Chi Minh City and hosted by Đức Bảo. The show was broadcast on VTV3 as well as the broadcaster's streaming platform VTVGo, and internationally via the Eurovision Song Contest YouTube channel. The competition featured five entries, which were curated by music director Huy Tuấn. The selected songwriters and producers were revealed on 10 September, followed by the titles on 16 September, and the songs themselves were released on 20 September.

==== Final ====
The final took place on 3 October 2026. "Em Tiên" was selected as the winner via a combination of votes from a five-member jury panel consisting of Lưu Thiên Hương, Huy Tuấn, Dương Khắc Linh, John Hùng Trần, and Gavin Nguyễn (40%), Vietnamese viewers (40%), and international viewers (20%), with votes in each category converted to a set of 12, 10, 8, 5, and 1 points. In addition to the competing entries, guest performers included S.T Sơn Thạch, Minh Hằng, Châu Anh, and Mylina.

Key: Winner

The Sound of Vietnam final
R/O	Song	Songwriter(s)
1	"Love Always Wins"	Nguyễn Đình Ngọc Trân
2	"Follow Me"	Gustav Mared; Tổng Đài
3	"Em Tiên"	Trần Thị Thu Hà; Phạm Khánh Dương
4	"Khó gì?"	Trần Thiên Phúc; Nguyễn Tuấn Duy; Phạm Châu Duy
5	"a to A"	Trần Bá Vương; Vũ Phạm Ngọc Duy; Lê Trung Bảo

== At Eurovision Asia ==
Tóc Tiên at Eurovision Song Contest Asia

The Eurovision Song Contest Asia 2026 took place at the One Bangkok Forum in Bangkok, Thailand on 14 November 2026. The show was broadcast on VTV3 on a 10-minute delay with commentary by Thái Trang, Ngọc Huy, and Phí Linh, and attracted an average of 1,025,178 viewers.

=== Performance ===
The staging for Tóc Tiên's performance at the contest featured three lotus leaves that move around on the stage, which she stepped between across the performance. The choreography was also changed from the national final, as did the outfits for Tiên and her four supporting dancers.

=== Voting ===
Vietnam had scored 164 points; 83 points from the juries and 81 points from the public vote.

==== Points awarded to Vietnam ====
Points awarded to Vietnam
Score	Jury
12 points	Nepal; Thailand
10 points	Bhutan; Cambodia
8 points	
7 points	Laos; Mongolia; Philippines
6 points	Bangladesh; Malaysia; South Korea
5 points	
4 points	
3 points	
2 points	
1 point	

==== Points awarded by Vietnam ====
Points awarded by Vietnam
Points	Jury
12 points	Laos
10 points	Mongolia
8 points	Cambodia
7 points	South Korea
6 points	Bhutan
5 points	Thailand
4 points	Philippines
3 points	Malaysia
2 points	Nepal
1 point	Bangladesh

== Participation overview ==
Table key
3	Third place
†	Upcoming event

Participation history
Year	Artist	Song	Language	Final	Points
2026	Tóc Tiên	"Em Tiên"	Vietnamese	3	164
