= South Korea in the Eurovision Song Contest Asia =

South Korea in the Eurovision Song Contest Asia 2026
- Eurovision Song Contest Asia 2026
- Participating broadcaster: KT ENA
- Country: South Korea
- Selection process: Korea's Next Wave
- Selection date: 4 September 2026

Competing entry
- Song: "Deep Dive"
- Artist: Junhee
- Songwriters: Alexaundra Christine Schneiderman; Jaehyuk Ryu; Notmixedyet; Park Junhee; Sarah Min

Placement
- Final result: 7th, 113 points

Participation chronology

South Korea, presented as the Republic of Korea, was represented at the Eurovision Song Contest Asia 2026 with the song "Deep Dive", written by Alexaundra Christine Schneiderman, Jaehyuk Ryu, Notmixedyet, Park Junhee and Sarah Min, and performed by Junhee himself. The South Korean participating broadcaster, KT ENA, selected its entry for the contest through the national final Korea's Next Wave.

== Background ==
On 31 March 2026, alongside the official announcement of the Eurovision Song Contest Asia 2026, South Korean broadcaster KT ENA was named as one of ten provisional participants, representing South Korea. That same day, a promotional video for the contest confirmed that ENA would hold a national final on 4 September 2026 to select its entry for the contest. The show's name was revealed to be Korea's Next Wave on 4 August.

== Before Eurovision Asia ==
=== Korea's Next Wave ===
Korea's Next Wave logo

Korea's Next Wave was the competition organised by ENA to select its entry for the Eurovision Song Contest Asia 2026. The final was held on 4 September 2026 and featured eight competing artists.

==== Format ====
Participants aged 18 or older could submit an original song no longer than 3 minutes for consideration. The maximum number of people on stage for a competing performance was six. In the final, the result was decided by a combination of the votes from a professional jury, which included singer Chae Ri-na, and public voting. Viewers were given eight free votes to spread across at least three acts, with an option of buying additional ten votes.

==== Competing acts ====
The eight competing artists were announced on 14 August 2026. Their competing songs were released on 23 August at 00:00 KST.

Artist	Song	Songwriter(s)
9278	"MakeItLoud (SheBarks)"	Gayün; Limhyewon; Zion Ro; Aya
Angel Noise	"Nan naya!" (난 나야!)	Zakky; Yue; Ilica; Kim Joonhyun; Haena
Huiae	"If I Knew Love" (Note: During the broadcast of Korea's Next Wave, the song was presented under the Korean title "Salangeul jal mollaseo" (사랑을 잘 몰라서))	Jungls; Tomajo; Noi
Junhee	"Deep Dive"	Alexaundra Christine Schneiderman; Jaehyuk Ryu; Notmixedyet; Park Junhee; Sarah Min
Kik	"F1"	Jung Wooseok; Jung Minhyuk; Oh Myeongsuk
Plzy	"Toc"	Plzy; Jeon Hyojin
Sojeong Shim	"Eheradiya" (에헤라디야)	Sojeong Shim; Hooni Jeon; Haey; Oat
Younghoon Ji	"Tiny Signal"	Younghoon Ji

==== Contest overview ====
The final was held on 4 September 2026 at 23:00 KST, and was hosted by Jo Kwon. It was aired on ENA as well as the Eurovision Song Contest's official YouTube channel. In addition to the competing acts, DNA, AtHeart and Naze performed as guests.

Korea's Next Wave final – 4 September 2026
R/O	Artist	Song	Place
1	Sojeong Shim	"Eheradiya"	2
2	Kik	"F1"	
3	Huiae	"If I Knew Love"	
4	Younghoon Ji	"Tiny Signal"	
5	Angel Noise	"Nan naya!"	3
6	9278	"MakeItLoud (SheBarks)"	
7	Plzy	"Toc"	
8	Junhee	"Deep Dive"	1

== At Eurovision Asia ==
Junhee at Eurovision Song Contest Asia

The Eurovision Song Contest Asia took place at the One Bangkok Forum in Bangkok on 14 November 2026.

On the evening of the final, South Korea performed 9th in the running order, following Thailand and preceding Nepal.

=== Performance ===
Compared to the national final, the Grand Final performance revamped the graphics and lighting. Junhee wore all red and was joined by a number of dancers in white.

=== Voting ===
At the close of voting, "Deep Dive" had received 113 points from the other participating countries, with 61 points from the juries, and 52 points from the online vote, finishing in 7th place overall. The South Korean jury awarded its own 12 points to the Philippines, the winner of the contest.

Points awarded to South Korea
Score	Country
12 points	
10 points	Philippines
8 points	Mongolia; Thailand
7 points	Bangladesh; Vietnam
6 points	Cambodia; Nepal
5 points	
4 points	Laos
3 points	Bhutan
2 points	Malaysia
1 point	
South Korea received 52 points from the online vote.

Points awarded by South Korea
Score	Country
12 points	Philippines
10 points	Malaysia
8 points	Thailand
7 points	Bhutan
6 points	Vietnam
5 points	Laos
4 points	Mongolia
3 points	Bangladesh
2 points	Nepal
1 point	Cambodia

== Participation overview ==
Table key
†	Upcoming event

Participation history
Year	Artist	Song	Language	Final	Points
2026	Junhee	"Deep Dive"	English	7	113
