= Bangladesh in the Eurovision Song Contest Asia =

Bangladesh in the Eurovision Song Contest Asia 2026
- Eurovision Song Contest Asia 2026
- Participating broadcaster: National Television (NTV)
- Country: Bangladesh
- Selection process: Voice of Bangladesh
- Selection date: 30 September 2026

Competing entry
- Song: "Tumi ele"
- Artist: Beatmosphere
- Songwriters: Ishtiyak Zobayer; Khandaker Shams; Mahi Bin Ashraful; Moktadir Dewan; Sidratul Mursalin Bhasha

Placement
- Final result: 11th, 35 points

Participation chronology

Bangladesh was represented at the Eurovision Song Contest Asia 2026 with the song "Tumi ele", written by Ishtiyak Zobayer, Khandaker Shams, Mahi Bin Ashraful, Moktadir Dewan and Sidratul Mursalin Bhasha, and performed by Beatmosphere. The Bangladeshi participating broadcaster, National Television (NTV), selected its entry for the contest through a national final.

== History ==
On 29 March 2026, a website was launched, claiming that the Eurovision Song Contest Asia 2026 would take place on 14 November in Bangkok, provisionally featuring nine countries which included Bhutan. The website was temporarily taken offline a few hours later. The contest was formally announced on 31 March 2026, with Thailand's Channel 3 serving as the host broadcaster. The initial announcement listed ten participating broadcasters from ten countries in the region. The inaugural contest will take place in Bangkok, Thailand at IdeaLive on 14 November 2026. Consisting of a single show, the results will be decided by a 50/50 split of professional jury voting and public voting. Each competing entry must be under three minutes and performed by no more than six people.

== Before Eurovision Asia ==
=== Voice of Bangladesh ===
Voice of Bangladesh logo

Bangladeshi National Television (NTV) selected its entry for the Eurovision Song Contest Asia 2026 through Voice of Bangladesh, with its final taking place on 30 September 2026. Ten artists took part, with the outcome decided by a jury consisted of Fahmida Nabi, Hamin Ahmed, Bappa Mazumder, Shawkat Ali Emon and Akhi Alamgir, alongside a public vote. The show was hosted by Tahsan Khan. The winner received a cash prize and a recording contract. The contest was broadcast on NTV and streaming platform Bongo.

In late July 2026, NTV selected twelve artists for a "special training session" to prepare them for the contest. At the end of July 2026, Bongo once again called for artists to apply for the contest. On 27 August 2026, the ten competing artists were selected following the end of the auditions.

==== Competing acts ====
On 15 September 2026, the ten competing artists were announced. Snippets of the songs were released on 19 September, and the full songs were released on 21 September.

Voice of Bangladesh participants
Artist	Song	Songwriter(s)
Beatmosphere	"Tumi Ele" (তুমি এলে)	Ishtiyak Zobayer; Khandaker Shams; Mahi Bin Ashraful; Moktadir Dewan; Sidratul Mursalin Bhasha
Benazir Zilani	"Ghum Chokhe Raat" (ঘুম চোখে রাত)	AS Omi; Benazir Zilani
Krishan Barman	"Kachuri Ful" (কচুরি ফুল)	Ahmed Bablu; Shoab Monir
Lubaina Afnan	"Dishehara" (দিশেহারা)	Lubaina Afnan; Nafius Salam
Nusrat Jahan (Kriti)	"Desi Star"	Hasib Reza; Nusrat Jahan Kriti
Pulak Adhikary	"Anari Majhi" (আনাড়ি মাঝি)	Pulak Adhikary
Sharot	"Anushilon (Preparation)" (অনুশীলন)	Md. Naim Imran Sikdar
Subconscious	"Janalachobi" (জানালাছবি)	Arifur Rahman Shykat; Johan Alamgir; Muhammad Nasfisur Rahman; Nahian Ayon; Raihan Alamgir
The Kushiyara Waves	"Mashuk Dhiyan (Lover’s Prayer)" (মাশুক ধ্যান)	Ahmed Ibn Arif; Akash Gayen; Samiul Wahid; Tasfia Fatima
Vintage Theory	"Boomerang!"	Marzuk Ahmed Khan Mojlish; Raad Ryaasat Khan; Rodel Advan; Taufiq Razhi Hassan

==== Contest overview ====
The final took place on 30 September 2026 at 21:00 (BST), and was hosted by Aswad Mustafiz Ador.

Voice of Bangladesh final
R/O	Artist	Song	Place				
R/O	Artist	Song	Place	1	Pulak Adhikary	"Anari Majhi"	2
2	Nusrat Jahan (Kriti)	"Desi Star"					
3	Krishan Barman	"Kachuri Ful"					
4	Subconscious	"Janalachobi"					
5	Benazir Zilani	"Ghum Chokhe Raat"					
6	The Kushiyara Waves	"Mashuk Dhiyan (Lover’s Prayer)"					
7	Lubaina Afnan	"Dishehara"					
8	Vintage Theory	"Boomerang!"	3				
9	Sharot	"Anushilon (Preparation)"					
10	Beatmosphere	"Tumi Ele"	1				

== At Eurovision Asia ==
Beatmosphere at Eurovision Song Contest Asia

The Eurovision Song Contest Asia took place at the One Bangkok Forum in Bangkok on 14 November 2026.

=== Voting ===
==== Points awarded to Bangladesh ====
Points awarded to Bangladesh
Score	Televote	Jury
12 points		
10 points		
8 points		
7 points		
6 points		
5 points		
4 points		
3 points		South Korea
2 points		Laos; Mongolia; Thailand; Philippines
1 point		Bhutan; Cambodia; Malaysia; Nepal; Vietnam

==== Points awarded by Bangladesh ====
Points awarded by Bangladesh
Points	Televote	Jury
12 points		Philippines
10 points		Laos
8 points		Thailand
7 points		South Korea
6 points		Vietnam
5 points		Mongolia
4 points		Malaysia
3 points		Cambodia
2 points		Nepal
1 point		Bhutan

== Participation overview ==
Table key
◁	Last place
†	Upcoming event

Participation history
Year	Artist	Song	Language	Final	Points
2026	Beatmosphere	"Tumi Ele" (তুমি এলে)	Bengali	11 ◁	35
2027	Confirmed intention to participate †				

== Broadcasts ==
Eurovision Song Contest Asia 2026 was broadcast in Bangladesh on NTV and streaming platform Bongo.
