= JMNK =

Thai musical duo

- Also known as: JustmineNika
- Origin: Bangkok, Thailand
- Genre: Pop
- Years active: 2022–present
- Label: XOXO Entertainment
- Members: Justmine; Nika

JMNK, originally stylized as JustmineNika (Thai: จัสมินณิก้า), is a Thai pop duo signed to XOXO Entertainment. It consists of members Justmine (Justmine Marisa Hughes) and Nika (Anika Hallman). They made their debut on 18 August 2022 with their debut single "Almost".

== History ==
Both Justmine (born 27 December 2001) and Nika (born 29 August 2002) previously competed in the 4Eve Girl Group Star contest but did not get selected as members of 4Eve. However, Justmine has starred in the music video for Atlas' "She Has Meaning".

JustmineNika debuted on 18 August 2022 with the single "Almost", with Panot Kunprasert (Nat Getsunova) as the lyricist and producer.

Then on 23 March 2023, JMNK released the upbeat song "Just Kid (ding) Knowing that it's a child" as their second single, the first song in which the two of them co-wrote the lyrics and melody themselves, with Sirasit Tangbunduangjit (Ben Luss) as the producer. Later in October of the same year, the two of them released the slow song "If you have a friend who is an ex-boyfriend" as their third single.

In 2024, JMNK released "Rak Jing (Kae Muea Wan)" as their 4th single in March and "Puen Teuan Laew (Ignore)" as their 5th single in September, with the music video for this song starring Nichakoon Khajornborirak.

On 19 August 2026, Channel 3 announced that JMNK were one of the 10 competing artists selected to compete in Thailand’s Chosen One.

== Discography ==
=== Singles ===
Year	Title
2022	"เกือบดี"
2023	"Just Kid (ding) รู้ว่าเด็ก"
2023	"ถ้าเธอมีเพื่อนเป็นแฟนเก่า"
2024	"รักจริง (แค่เมื่อวาน)"
2024	"เพื่อนเตือนแล้ว (Ignore)"
2025	"เพื่อนแบบใด (I See It)"
2025	"DMMA"
2025	"Sheป้ะ"
2026	"แม่บอก"
2026	"วอน"
2026	"ไม่คิดถึงเท่าไหร่ (Behind The Smile)"
