= Monetrey Ek =

Cambodian singer-songwriter (born 2002)

Monetrey Ek មន្ត្រីយ៍ ឯក
- Monetrey in 2026

Background information
- Born: February 7, 2002 (age 24); Bondy, France
- Labels: Plus 855 Music; Soriya Entertainment

Monetrey Ek (Khmer: មន្ត្រីយ៍ ឯក; born February 7, 2002) is a Cambodian singer-songwriter. He represented Cambodia in the Eurovision Song Contest Asia 2026 with the song "I Let You Go".

== Biography ==
=== Early life ===
Monetrey Ek was born on February 7, 2002, in Bondy, France. He moved to Cambodia at age seven and has lived there ever since. The youngest of seven children, he has five sisters and one brother. His older brother is also involved in music and founded an English-language singing group. Ek completed his secondary education through an online programme at Excel High School.

=== Career ===
On September 3, 2026, he signed with Soriya Entertainment and released his first single under the label, "Muoy lean reatrei (One Million Nights)," on September 18, 2026, featuring NPN.

In early October 2026, he was announced as one of the competing acts in Cambodia's Finest Voice, the national selection for Eurovision Song Contest Asia 2026. On 17 October, he won the selection with the song "I Let You Go", earning the right to represent Cambodia at the contest in Bangkok, Thailand, on 14 November.

== Discography ==
=== Extended plays ===
List of extended plays, with selected details
Title	Details
Departure	Released: 4 June 2021; Label: Independent release; Format: Digital download, streaming

=== Singles ===
==== As lead artist ====
List of singles as lead artist, showing year released and album name
Title	Year	Album
"Saturday Night"	2020	Non-album singles
"Talk Cuz I'm Lonely"	2020	Non-album singles
"Grateful"	2020	Non-album singles
"Won't Forget You"	2022	Non-album singles
"Oh Sh!t"	2022	Non-album singles
"Calling Your Phone"	2022	Non-album singles
"First Step"	2022	Non-album singles
"Overdrive"	2023	Non-album singles
"I Guess This Is It..."	2023	Non-album singles
"Love and Sunshine"	2023	Non-album singles
"Come For Me" (featuring Mut Phearin and Meezy24k)	2024	Non-album singles
"Would You Give Me A Chance"	2025	Non-album singles
"K mloh kamr sne" (កម្លោះកម្រស្នេហ៍)	2025	Non-album singles
"Pisey"	2026	Non-album singles
"Chng tinh touren (Durian)" (ចង់ទិញទុរេន)	2026	Non-album singles
"Muoy lean reatrei (One Million Nights)" (មួយលានរាត្រី) (featuring NPN)	2026	Non-album singles
"I Let You Go"	2026	Non-album singles

==== As featured artist ====
List of singles as featured artist, showing year released and album name
Title	Year	Album
"Cambodia, I Hear You Calling" (La Cima featuring All3rgy, Meezy24k, Hasha, Mut Phearin, YCN Dizzy, YCN Rakhie, YCN Tomie, Monetrey Ek and Chan SreyKhouch)	2025	Non-album singles
"Ocean Breeze" (All3rgy featuring Monetrey Ek)	2026	Non-album singles

Awards and achievements
Preceded by None	Cambodia in the Eurovision Song Contest Asia; 2026	Succeeded by TBD
