= Sobra-Sobra =

2026 single by Carmelle

Single by Carmelle
- Language: English; Tagalog
- English title: Too Much
- Released: August 17, 2026
- Recorded: 2026
- Length: 2:59
- Label: Star
- Songwriters: Gianina Camille del Rosario; Mart Sam Emmanuel Olavides
- Producers: Mat Olavides; Jonathan Manalo

Carmelle singles chronology
| "Morena" (2026) | "Sobra-Sobra" (2026) |

Lyric video
- "Sobra-Sobra" on YouTube

Eurovision Song Contest Asia 2026 entry
- Country: Philippines
- Artist: Carmelle
- Languages: English; Tagalog
- Composers: Gianina Camille del Rosario; Mart Sam Emmanuel Olavides
- Lyricists: Gianina Camille del Rosario; Mart Sam Emmanuel Olavides

Finals performance
- Final result: 1st
- Final points: 211

Official performance video
- "Sobra-Sobra" on YouTube

"Sobra-Sobra" (transl. Too Much) is a song by Filipino singer Carmelle. It was released on August 17, 2026 by Star Music. The song was written by Nica del Rosario and Mat Olavides, the latter in whom also handled production alongside Jonathan Manalo. It represented the Philippines in the Eurovision Song Contest Asia 2026. The song won the contest with a total of 211 points.

== Background and composition ==
"Sobra-Sobra" was written by Nica del Rosario and Mat Olivades, the latter in whom also produced alongside Jonathan Manalo. As stated by ABS-CBN, the song has been described as an empowering dance song and a tribute to Filipino women. The lyrics carry the message that women are neither "too much" and "not enough" and that they have the right to decide who they want to be.

== Promotion and release ==
On August 10, 2026, ABS-CBN announced Carmelle as one of the participants in the Philippine Selection Night, the Philippines' national selection for the Eurovision Song Contest Asia 2026, with the song "Sobra-Sobra". A fifteen-second snippet of her song was released on August 12, and the full song was released on August 17. The song won the competition on August 30, earning it the right to represent the Philippines in the Eurovision Song Contest Asia 2026 in Bangkok, Thailand, in November. On November 14, it won Eurovision Asia overall.

== Release history ==
| Region | Date | Format | Label |
|---|---|---|---|
| Various | August 17, 2026 | Digital download, streaming | Star |
