= Beatmosphere =

Bangladeshi a cappella group

- Beatmosphere in 2026

Background information
- Origin: Bangladesh
- Genres: A cappella; beatboxing
- Years active: 2009–present
- Label: Bharitone Studios
- Members: Zardo; Glizmo; Bhasha; Sykoverse; BeatBaksho; Invalíd; Anarchy; Dippox; RafTeknix

Beatmosphere is an all-male Bangladeshi a capella group formed in 2009. The line up is composed of Zardo, Glizmo, Bhasha, Sykoverse, BeatBaksho, Invalíd, Anarchy, Dippox and RafTeknix. They represented Bangladesh at the inaugural Eurovision Song Contest Asia with the song "Tumi Ele", finishing last with 35 points.

== History ==
Beatmosphere was formed in 2009 by Moktadir "BeatBaksho" Dewan.

On 22 September 2026, the NTV selected Beatmosphere as one of 10 artists to compete in the Voice of Bangladesh with the song "Tumi Ele". They won the competition on 30 September, earning them the right to represent Bangladesh in the Eurovision Song Contest Asia 2026 in Bangkok, Thailand, in November. Although the group normally performs as a nine-member ensemble, they competed as a sextet due to the contest's rules only allowing for six performers on stage, with Anarchy, Dippox and RafTeknix not participating.

== Members ==
=== Current members ===
- Ishtiyak Zobayer (Zardo)
- Sayed Ahnaf Tahmid (Glizmo)
- Sidratul Mursalin Bhasha (Bhasha)
- Mahi Bin Ashraful (Sykoverse)
- Moktadir Dewan (BeatBaksho)
- Mahi Hossain Khan (Invalíd)
- Khandaker Shams (Anarchy)
- Prachyo Priyodip (Dippox)
- Rafiun Nabi Nahin (RafTeknix)

== Discography ==
=== Singles ===
==== As lead artist ====
List of singles as lead artist, showing year released and album name
Title	Year	Album
"Shob Kichu Bhalo Lage" (সব কিছু ভালো লাগে)	2026	Non-album singles
"Tumi Ele" (তুমি এলে)	2026	Non-album singles

Awards and achievements
Preceded by None	Bangladesh in the Eurovision Song Contest Asia; 2026	Succeeded by TBD
