= Imaji =

Studio album by Aina Abdul
- Released: 25 October 2023; 25 October 2024 (Deluxe Edition)
- Length: 60:11
- Label: Aina Abdul Entertainment
- Producers: Aina Abdul, Mac Chew, Jenny Chin, Ezra Kong, Affan Mazlan, Farouk Roman (Deluxe), Sze Wan (Deluxe)

Singles from Imaji
- 1. "Jangan Mati Rasa Itu" Released: 2023; 2. "Puas Sudah" Released: 2024; 3. "Kamu" Released: 2024; 4. "Jadi Ajar Aku" Released: 2024

Imaji is the debut album of Malaysian singer-songwriter Aina Abdul. Released on 25 October 2023, the album was produced by Aina Abdul Entertainment.

The word "Imaji" was selected as the title because of its meaning:

"Imaji : a mental image or imagery formed in a person's mind, often related to clear sensory experience that could evoke a vision, hearing or feeling".

Imaji (Deluxe Edition) is the expanded version of Aina Abdul's 2023 debut album Imaji. It was released on 25 October 2024, exactly one year after the release of the debut album.

To celebrate the first anniversary of Imaji, Aina Abdul came up with Deluxe Edition with three new tracks added to the album.

== Production ==
Aina Abdul began the production of Imaji in 2022 and it took her almost a year to complete. During the production phase, Aina Abdul mentioned that she was almost given up due to hectic scheduling packed with shows, concerts and prior engagements. Nevertheless, Aina Abdul kept to the words of maestro Datuk Ramli M.S when he insisted that any singers in Malaysia must have albums in order to make concerts and to survive in the industry.

The production cost of Imaji was about RM300,000 including but not limited to recording session, music videos, photoshoot, physical album, etc. The album was released in anticipation of Aina Abdul's big concert in Axiata Arena titled "A Night With Aina Abdul 3.0".

As for the cover art, Aina mentioned that during the photoshoot session, there were 5 outfits and the cover art that was selected was plastic wraps by Behati. It was selected because of its deep meaning; the plastic elements that wrapped around herself are layers that you have to unfold to get to know the real Aina Abdul.

Most of the songs were penned in a span of one year and over the course of writing, the album went from 14 songs to 12, then to 10 and then back to 12 songs. And with just two months to the album's release, Aina wrote another two songs. She exclusively put the song "Lost" as an hommage to her gig years.

Aina Abdul collaborated with renowned producers like Mac Chew, Jenny Chin, Ezra Kong and Affan Mazlan.

== Release and reception ==
The album was released on 25 October 2023 through various streaming platform and it received positive reviews by the critics and mass listeners. Imaji was peaked at Number 1 in iTunes Music Chart.

== Tracklisting ==
No.	Title	Composer	Lyricist	Producers	Length
1.	Imaji	Aina Abdul	Aina Abdul	Aina Abdul, Affan Mazlan	3:00
2.	Satu Rasa	Aina Abdul	Aina Abdul	Aina Abdul, Mac Chew	4:55
3.	Jangan Mati Rasa Itu	Aina Abdul	Aina Abdul	Mac Chew	5:05
4.	Kamu	Aina Abdul	Aina Abdul	Aina Abdul, Mac Chew	4:47
5.	Puas Sudah	Aina Abdul	Aina Abdul	Aina Abdul, Mac Chew	4:41
6.	Sesal	Aina Abdul, Serry Khaled	Aina Abdul	Jenny Chin	5:28
7.	Kejam	Aina Abdul	Aina Abdul	Aina Abdul, Affan Mazlan	3:06
8.	Bilang	Aina Abdul	Aina Abdul	Jenny Chin	4:22
9.	Bukan Untukku	Aina Abdul	Aina Abdul	Affan Mazlan	3:40
10.	Sedia Terluka	Aina Abdul	Aina Abdul	Aina Abdul, Affan Mazlan	4:22
11.	Ini Bukan Cinta	Aina Abdul, Ezra Kong	Aina Abdul, Ezra Kong	Ezra Kong, Affan Mazlan	3:43
12.	Lost	Aina Abdul	Aina Abdul	Aina Abdul, Affan Mazlan	3:37
13.	Penat Jiwa	Aina Abdul	Aina Abdul	Aina Abdul, Affan Mazlan	3:51
14.	Kunci	Aina Abdul	Aina Abdul	Aina Abdul, Affan Mazlan	3:38
15.	Menua (Deluxe Edition)	Farouk Roman, Aina Abdul	Aina Abdul	Farouk Roman	3:50
16.	Jadi Ajar Aku (Deluxe Edition)	Aina Abdul	Aina Abdul	Sze Wan	4:57
17.	Gentayangan (Deluxe Edition)	Aina Abdul	Aina Abdul	Affan Mazlan	3:54
Total length					60:11

== Accolades and recognition ==
Throughout the years, Aina Abdul received multiple accolades and recognition through her compositions in Imaji, notably :

Jangan Mati Rasa Itu

- Won
  - Most Amazing Song/Audio Award, Gempak Most Wanted Awards 2023, 2024
  - 3rd Place, Anugerah Juara Lagu (AJL38), 2024
  - Best Vocal Award, Anugerah Juara Lagu (AJL38), 2024
  - Best Pop Song, Anugerah Industri Muzik (AIM24), 2025
  - Best Vocal Performance in a Song (Female), Anugerah Industri Muzik (AIM24), 2025
- Nominated :
  - The Most Booming Song, Anugerah Bintang Popular Berita Harian (ABPBH-36), 2024
  - Best Album/Single Cover, Anugerah Industri Muzik (AIM24), 2025

Puas Sudah

- Won
  - Best Performance Award, Anugerah Juara Lagu (AJL39), 2025
  - Unifi Mobile's Choice Award, Anugerah Juara Lagu (AJL39), 2025
- Nominated :
  - Best Music Video, Gempak Most Wanted Awards 2024, 2025

Kamu (2024 Remaster)

- Nominated :
  - Best Song Recording, Anugerah Industri Muzik (AIM24), 2025

Imaji (Album)

- Nominated:
  - Best Album, Anugerah Industri Muzik (AIM24), 2025

Imaji Deluxe Edition (Album)

- Won
  - Best Album Recording, Anugerah Industri Muzik (AIM24), 2025
- Nominated
  - Best Album, Anugerah Industri Muzik (AIM24), 2025
