= Nyendra =

Bhutanese singer (born 2001 or 2002)

Nyendra ཉེན་དྲ
- Nyendra in 2026

Background information
- Born: Thukten Nyendra; 2001 or 2002 (age 24–25); Mebisa, Chukha District, Bhutan
- Origin: Thimphu, Bhutan
- Genres: Pop; folk-pop; acoustic; rhythm and blues
- Occupations: Singer; songwriter; music producer
- Instrument: Vocals
- Years active: 2022–present

Thukten Nyendra (Dzongkha: ཐུག་བསྟན་ཉེན་དྲ; born 2001 or 2002), known mononymously as Nyendra (Dzongkha: ཉེན་དྲ), is a Bhutanese singer-songwriter and music producer. He represented Bhutan in the Eurovision Song Contest Asia 2026 with the song "Lhayi Semo", finishing 6th in the grand final of the contest with 126 points.

== Early life ==
Nyendra was born in 2001 or 2002, in Mebisa, a town in Chukha District, Bhutan, where he was also raised. His mother is named Nidup Tshomo. He has been playing the guitar and singing since he was four or five years old.

== Musical career ==
His 2024 single "Oh No!" went viral amongst TikTok users in Bhutan, bringing him his first recognition in the country.

In August 2025, Nyendra competed at Druk Dra 2025, where he reached the final before the latter was cancelled.

On 28 July 2026, Nyendra was one of the five artists selected for Rhythm of Bhutan, while his competing song "Lhayi Semo" was released on 7 August. He won the competition on 11 August, earning him the right to represent Bhutan in the Eurovision Song Contest Asia 2026 in Bangkok, Thailand in November. He finished sixth in the grand final in Bangkok with 126 points, of which 55 came from the jury votes and 71 were from the online votes.

== Personal life ==
Nyendra moved to the capital city of Thimphu at 19 to pursue his music career. In July 2025, he graduated from Royal Thimphu College with a degree in Mass Communication and Journalism.

== Discography ==
=== Studio albums ===
List of studio albums, with selected details
Title	Details
Let Me Tell You a Story	Released: 10 September 2025; Label: Independent release; Format: Digital download, streaming

=== Singles ===
==== As lead artist ====
List of singles as lead artist, showing year released and album name
Title	Year	Album
"A No Love Like This"	2022	Non-album singles
"December"	2023	Non-album singles
"You and Me"	2023	Non-album singles
"Hint"	2024	Non-album singles
"Oh No!"	2024	Non-album singles
"Tell Me"	2024	Non-album singles
"I"	2025	Non-album singles
"Take Me Back"	2025	Let Me Tell You a Story
"Zamling" (འཛམ་གླིང)	2025	Non-album singles
"Lhayi Semo (The Angel)" (ལྷ་ཡི་སྲས་མོ།)	2026	Non-album singles

==== As featured artist ====
List of singles as featured artist, showing year released and album name
Title	Year	Album
"Collide" (Jigme Chophel Wangyel featuring Nyendra and Sangs)	2024	Non-album singles
"Secrets" (Jigme Chophel Wangyel featuring Nyendra)	2024	Non-album singles

Awards and achievements
Preceded by None	Bhutan in the Eurovision Song Contest Asia; 2026	Succeeded by TBD
