= Bhutan in the Eurovision Song Contest Asia =

Bhutan in the Eurovision Song Contest Asia 2026
- Eurovision Song Contest Asia 2026
- Participating broadcaster: Bhutan Broadcasting Service (BBS)
- Country: Bhutan
- Selection process: Rhythm of Bhutan
- Selection date: 11 August 2026

Competing entry
- Song: "Lhayi semo"
- Artist: Nyendra
- Songwriters: Lungten Wangchuk; Thukten Nyendra

Placement
- Final result: 6th, 126 points

Participation chronology

Bhutan was represented at the Eurovision Song Contest Asia 2026 with the song "Lhayi semo", written by Lungten Wangchuk and Thukten Nyendra, and performed by Nyendra himself. The Bhutanese participating broadcaster, the Bhutan Broadcasting Service (BBS), selected its entry for the contest through a national final.

== Before Eurovision Asia ==
=== Druk Dra 2025 ===
Druk Dra 2025 title card.

The Bhutan Broadcasting Service (BBS) organised a televised national competition to select its entry for the Eurovision Asia Song Contest 2025, a contest that had not yet been officially announced. The selection was titled Druk Dra 2025 (Dzongkha: འབྲུག་སྒྲ།, romanized: Druk Dra, lit. 'Thunderclap'; IPA: [ɖ(ʐ)ṳ̀e̯ ɖ(ʐ)a]) and consisted of five episodes. The first three episodes were qualification rounds, the fourth was the semi-final, and the fifth was set to be the final. A total of ten contestants took part in the competition that took place at the BBS Studios in Thimphu.

==== Third episode ====
The third episode aired on 22 August 2025. The contestants performed covers. 90% of the result was determined by the jury, with 10% decided by an online vote. Seven contestants qualified for the semi-final.

Episode 3
R/O	Artist	Result
1	Sangay Lhaden	Qualified
7	Tshering Namgay	Qualified
3	Pelden Wangchuk	Qualified
4	Karma Drupchu	Qualified
-	Drukbi Tshompapo	Withdrew
6	Tashi Choden	Qualified
9	Kinga Rinchen	Eliminated
8	Nyendra	Qualified
2	Tandih Phub	Eliminated
5	Baeyul 301	Qualified

==== Fourth episode ====
The fourth episode aired on 26 August 2025. This episode is considered the semi-final, and the contestants performed covers. 80% of the result was determined by the jury, with 20% decided by an online vote, including the votes from the previous shows. Five contestants qualified for the final.

Episode 4
R/O	Artist	Jury	Online vote	Result
1	Sangay Lhaden	259	20.09%	Qualified
7	Nyendra	258	17.38%	Qualified
4	Baeyul 301	243	16.99%	Qualified
3	Karma Drupchu	173	12.10%	Eliminated
2	Tshering Namgay	166	11.17%	Qualified
6	Pelden Wangchuk	168	11.36%	Qualified
5	Tashi Choden	158	10.92%	Eliminated

==== Cancellation of the fifth episode ====
The fifth and final episode was originally scheduled for 29 August 2025, with 70% of the result set to be determined by the jury, and 30% decided by an online vote. The winner was to represent Bhutan at the Eurovision Asia Song Contest 2025, with the runner up representing Bhutan at ABU TV Song Festival 2025.

On 28 August 2025, Martin Green, Director of the Eurovision Song Contest, stated that "no plans have been confirmed or announced to date" for the contest in Asia. He further noted that the Eurovision format rights holders in Asia had been in contact with BBS, and that the show had been taken off air and removed from online platforms. Sangay Lhaden, one of the finalists, claimed on TikTok that the final was only postponed.

Following the cancellation, BBS internally selected Pema Samdrup, a member of the Druk Dra jury, with the song "The Song of Joy" to represent Bhutan at the ABU TV Song Festival 2025.

On 31 March 2026, the European Broadcasting Union (EBU) officially announced the Eurovision Song Contest Asia, and stated that the cancellation of Druk Dra 2025 had resulted from a misunderstanding with BBS.

=== Rhythm of Bhutan ===
Rhythm of Bhutan logo

Following the confirmation of the participation of BBS in the Eurovision Song Contest Asia 2026 representing Bhutan, the broadcaster announced the resumption of the national final with the name of Rhythm of Bhutan, though Druk Dra remained the competition's Dzongkha title. The final took place on 11 August 2026, and featured five competing entries.

The result was decided by a combination of the votes from a professional jury (40%) – consisting of Choeying Jatsho, Pema Samdrup, Sonam Dorji and Ugyen – Bhutanese public voting (40%), and the Rest of the World voting (20%). Members of the public were given 8 free votes to spread across at least 3 acts, with an option of buying additional 10 votes.

==== Competing acts ====
On 28 July 2026, BBS announced the five competing artists, selected "after months of auditions and live performances", which consisted of four finalists of Druk Dra 2025 and one semi-finalist. The competing songs were released on 7 August 2026.

Rhythm of Bhutan participants
Artist	Song	Songwriter(s)
Baeyul 301	"Drenpa (The Memories)" (དྲན་པ།)	Jamyang Yeshi; Mithup Dawa; Kaya Gyeltshen; Jampel Zangpo; Tshering Tobgyel Jamtsho; Vinod Ghalley
Karma Drupchu	"Pha yuel (The Homeland)" (ཕ་གཡུས།)	Karma Drupchu; Sonam Tenzin
Nyendra	"Lhayi semo (The Angel)" (ལྷ་ཡི་སྲས་མོ།)	Lungten Wangchuk; Thukten Nyendra
Pelden Wangchuk	"Jo'druel (The Journey)" (འགྱོ་འགྲུལ།།)	Pelden Wangchuk; Phurba Rigsel
The Sangay Lhaden Band	"Pemi tshewang tashi (The Legend)" (པད་མའི་ཚེ་དབང་བཀྲ་ཤིས།)	Sangay Lhaden; Sherab Dorji; Vivak Biswa

==== Contest overview ====
The final was held on 11 August 2026 at 19:00 BTT at the Norling Studios in Thimphu, The winner was decided by a combination of jury voting, Bhutanese public voting and international public voting. The show was presented by Kelzang Dolkar in English and Phub Tshering in Dzongkha. The final was broadcast on BBS 1, streamed online on BBS' platforms, and on the Eurovision Song Contest official YouTube page. The winner was the song "Lhayi Semo (The Angel)", written by Lungten Wangchuk and Thukten Nyendra, and performed by Nyendra himself.

In addition to the competing acts, the interval featured Bhutanese high schoolers and scouts performing dance routines. The live stream on the official Eurovision Song Contest YouTube channel faced a multitude of technical issues, with viewers being unable to watch almost the entire first song, and audio issues emerging during the second song. However, BBS's own YouTube stream did not face any issues.

Rhythm of Bhutan final – 11 August 2026
R/O	Artist	Song	Jury	Public vote		Total	Place
R/O	Artist	Song	Jury	Bhutan	Intl.	Total	Place
1	Karma Drupchu	"Pha yuel (The Homeland)"	10	10	12	32	4
2	The Sangay Lhaden Band	"Pemi tshewang tashi (The Legend)"	20	16	5	41	2
3	Nyendra	"Lhayi semo (The Angel)"	24	20	8	52	1
4	Pelden Wangchuk	"Jo'druel (The Journey)"	16	2	1	19	5
5	Baeyul 301	"Drenpa (The Memories)"	2	24	10	36	3

== At Eurovision Asia ==
Nyendra at Eurovision Song Contest Asia

The Eurovision Song Contest Asia took place at the One Bangkok Forum in Bangkok on 14 November 2026.

=== Performance ===
The stage performance retained elements of the national final performance. Nyendra, who wore the Gho, Bhutan's traditional national male outfit, performs alone on stage. The backdrop for his performance is a mountainscape reflecting Bhutan’s location in the Himalayas.

=== Voting ===
==== Points awarded to Bhutan ====
Points awarded to Bhutan
Score	Televote	Jury
12 points		Malaysia
10 points		
8 points		
7 points		Cambodia; South Korea
6 points		Laos; Vietnam
5 points		Mongolia
4 points		Nepal; Philippines
3 points		Thailand
2 points		
1 point		Bangladesh

==== Points awarded by Bhutan ====
Points awarded by Bhutan
Points	Televote	Jury
12 points		Philippines
10 points		Vietnam
8 points		Laos
7 points		Thailand
6 points		Malaysia
5 points		Cambodia
4 points		Mongolia
3 points		South Korea
2 points		Nepal
1 point		Bangladesh

== Participation overview ==
Table key
†	Upcoming event

Participation history
Year	Artist	Song	Language	Final	Points
2026	Nyendra	"Lhayi Semo" (ལྷ་ཡི་སྲས་མོ།)	Dzongkha	6	126
