= Aina Abdul =

Malaysian singer, songwriter, and actress (born 1993)

- Abdul in 2026
- Born: Nurul Aina binti Abdul Ghani; 25 October 1993 (age 33); Johor Bahru, Johor, Malaysia
- Education: Bachelor in Music (Contemporary), UCSI University
- Occupations: Singer; songwriter; actress
- Musical career
- Genres: Pop; ballad
- Instruments: Vocals; piano
- Years active: 2010–present
- Label: Universal Music Indonesia
- Website: www.ainaabdul.my

Nurul Aina Abdul Ghani (born 25 October 1993) is a Malaysian singer, songwriter, and actress. She gained initial recognition as a finalist on the television singing competition Mentor Legend in 2014, and later rose to fame through her performances in Anugerah Juara Lagu (AJL), one of Malaysia's most established music competitions.

Known for her strong vocals, emotional delivery, and unique fashion sense, Abdul has released multiple hit singles, including "Semalam", "Sepi", and "Terus Hidup". She represented Malaysia in the Eurovision Song Contest Asia 2026 with the song "Bluest Sky", finishing in fourth place.

== Early life ==
Nurul Aina Abdul Ghani was born on 25 October 1993 in Johor Bahru, Johor, and raised in Seremban, Negeri Sembilan. She is the youngest of five siblings to Abdul Ghani Abdullah and Zaini Abdullah. She received her early education at Sekolah Kebangsaan Sri Mawar, Senawang, then continued her secondary education at Sekolah Menengah Kebangsaan Puteri. After obtaining her Malaysian Certificate of Education (SPM), Abdul continued her studies at UCSI University, Kuala Lumpur, before graduating in 2020 and obtaining a Bachelor of Contemporary Music degree in 2021.

== Career ==
=== 2010–2014: Early career ===
Abdul began her music career as a gig singer in various dining places and lounges, including No Black Tie. She was then selected as one of the finalists in the Irama 1Malaysia Competition organized by Radio Televisyen Malaysia (RTM) in 2010. The following year, she won second place in Bintang Idola Berita Harian 2011, followed by winning first place in the Golden Voices of PJ competition in 2012.

=== 2014–2018: Mentor Legend, and debut single ===
In 2014, Abdul participated in Mentor Legend and was crowned runner-up. After finishing Mentor Legend, she was selected to represent Malaysia at the World Championship of Performing Arts (WCOPA) 2014 which took place in Hollywood, California, United States, and became the winner of Vocalist of the World.

She then signed a contract with Indigital Music and released her first single, "Ini Yang Kau Mahu" in September 2015. In 2017, Aina released her first English song, "Reminiscing", followed by her second English song, "Shadows" in 2018.

She began her acting career by playing Irma in the drama Seindah Takdir Cinta in 2016.

=== 2019–2021: Breakthrough, and Anugerah Juara Lagu ===
In 2019, Aina Abdul released her debut single "Sumpah" and it was her official debut as a solo recording artist which showcased her dual role as both a vocalist and songwriter. The single received critical acclaim, establishing Aina as a rising star in Malaysia's contemporary music scene.

Upon its release, "Sumpah" garnered widespread recognition for its heartfelt lyrics and powerful performance. The song also marked her entry into the mainstream Malaysian music industry through the Anugerah Juara Lagu platform, helping her gain recognition among a broader audience.

In 2020, Aina competed on The Masked Singer Malaysia as Bunga Raya, the national flower of Malaysia, and won. She then participated in Vokal Mania and Separuh Akhir Muzik Muzik 35. On 26 December 2020, she was crowned the champion of Vokal Mania along with Aisha Retno as the Rookie Champion.

In December 2020, her song titled "Semalam" qualified for the 35th Anugerah Juara Lagu (AJL35) which took place at the MBSA Auditorium Shah Alam on 14 March 2021, without an audience due to the COVID-19 pandemic. "Semalam" marked a historic moment for Aina and her fans, Ainations, after being crowned Runner-Up at AJL35.

On 8 February 2021, Aina released her single titled "Sepi". "Sepi" then won the Best Vocal award in Anugerah Juara Lagu 36.

In September 2021, Aina released a single using her own name as the title of the song; Aina Abdul. This song combines three of her popular songs, namely "Sumpah", "Semalam" and "Sepi". According to Aina, the combination of this song is symbolic of her heart and what she has felt all this time. This was followed by the release of her English single titled "Fool" in December 2021. The song also charted in Japan.

On 16 and 17 December 2021, Aina held her first solo concert, A Night with Aina Abdul which took place at Bsync Live Kuala Lumpur. The second edition of this concert was later held on 25 and 26 June 2022 at Panggung Sari, Istana Budaya.

=== 2022–2023: Critical acclaim, and Imaji ===
In June 2022 Aina came out with a single titled "Terus Hidup". "Terus Hidup" qualified for the 37th Anugerah Juara Lagu (AJL 37) which took place at Axiata Arena Bukit Jalil (Axiata Arena Stadium) on 12 February 2023, and was crowned the AJL 37 Champion. Aina Abdul also took home the trophy for the AJL37 Best Vocal award.

In August 2023, Aina Abdul released the first single “Jangan Mati Rasa Itu” from her album and the song was later qualified for the 38th Anugerah Juara Lagu. Aina Abdul won the Best Vocal award and third place through this single.

October 2023 saw Aina launched her debut album titled Imaji, featuring 14 songs, composed by herself and other composers. The album received critical acclaims from listeners.

Her first large-scale concert, A Night with Aina Abdul 3.0 at Axiata Arena, Bukit Jalil was held on 18 November 2023 with the theme of Aina Abdul, attended by close to 10,000 fans. It was touted as one of her most bold moves to hold a concert at such venue and was well praised by concert-goers.

=== 2024: Bintang Paling Popular, and continued success ===
The first week of 2024, Aina performed for her first solo concert in Singapore, A Night With Aina Abdul Live In Singapore

Aina Abdul took the stage alongside the Malaysian Philharmonic Orchestra for two nights of musical magic on 10 and 11 May 2024 at the Dewan Filharmonik Petronas (DFP) in Kuala Lumpur City Centre (KLCC). This collaboration marks yet another milestone in Aina's career, which has seen her present sold-out concerts such as Aina Abdul 2.0 at Istana Budaya (2022), A Night With Aina Abdul 3.0 at Axiata Arena Bukit Jalil (2023), and A Night With Aina Abdul ‘Live’ In Singapore (2024)

In October 2024, Malaysian singer-songwriter Aina Abdul was awarded with the Bintang Paling Popular (Most Popular Star) award at the Anugerah Bintang Popular Berita Harian ke-36 (ABPBH 36). The award ceremony took place at the Auditorium Majlis Bandaraya Shah Alam (MBSA). Aina secured this accolade with a total of 8,882,662 votes from fans. In addition to the Bintang Paling Popular award, Aina clinched the Penyanyi Wanita Popular (Most Popular Female Singer) title at the same event.

By the end of 2024, Aina Abdul embarked on a significant phase of her musical journey, marked by the culmination of her Imaji Tour and a strategic shift towards collaborative projects.

=== 2025–present: Artistic Growth, cross-country collaborations, and Eurovision Song Contest Asia ===
The year 2025 commenced with the final leg of Aina's concert series, the Imaji Tour. The concluding performance took place on 11 January 2025, at Dewan Mu'adzam Shah, Universiti Utara Malaysia (UUM), Sintok, Kedah. This tour, which began in late 2024, was organized to promote her debut album, Imaji, released in October 2023. The tour covered multiple locations, including Sarawak and Kuala Lumpur, allowing Aina to connect with fans across Malaysia.

Following the tour's conclusion, Aina announced her intention to pause solo concerts for the remainder of 2025. This decision was driven by her desire to explore new ventures in the music industry, particularly focusing on collaborations with both local and international artists.

On 17 April 2025, Aina Abdul has been selected to perform at a state dinner hosted by the Prime Minister of Malaysia, YAB Datuk Seri Anwar Bin Ibrahim, in honor of President Xi Jinping's official visit. She performed alongside National Songstress Dato' Sri Siti Nurhaliza. As Malaysia assumed its chairmanship for ASEAN in 2025, an official theme song has been composed by Datuk Mokhzani Ismail for the 46th ASEAN Summit (26 May 2025) and Aina Abdul has once again been selected to be the official singer for the theme song called "Our Land, Our Home".

Starting 22 June 2025, Aina Abdul has been selected as one of five juries for the singing reality show "Raise The Star Malaysia (RTSMY) - Season 1". The 8-episode show aimed to find the best up-and-coming singer who has the potential to become a star. At the end of the show, each jury who is also composer will compose a song for the top 5 contestants. On 10 August 2025, Didie Shazry was announced as the Winner for RSTMY with the debut single "Peganglah Hati" composed by Aina Abdul.

On 13 September 2025, Aina Abdul's debut album IMAJI received massive recognition at the highly prestigious annual Malaysian music ceremony Anugerah Industri Muzik 24. With 9 nominations across 8 categories, Aina Abdul became one of the most nominated singers in AIM24. She begged 4 trophies that night with Best Female Vocal, Best Pop Song, Best Album Recording and the most renowned Best Song. With 4 trophies, she became one of the most awarded singers in AIM24 tying with Faizal Tahir.

On 26 September 2025, Aina Abdul launched her new single titled "Sesaat". The song marked the new beginning of her musical journey with cross-country collaborations as she partnered with Sony Music Indonesia and Sony Music Malaysia. The song was written by Fabio Asher, Yafi Aria and Trakast.

On 15 August 2026, at the 40th Anugerah Juara Lagu, Abdul received the Best Performance award for her performance of "Kamu" and was named the Shopee Choice Artist Icon, the latter of which resulted in her selection as Malaysia's representative for the Eurovision Song Contest Asia 2026. Her contest entry is "Bluest Sky".

== Discography ==
=== Studio albums ===
- Imaji (2023)

=== Singles ===
Title	Year	Lyricist	Composer
"Ini Yang Kau Mahu"	2015	Aina Abdul	Aina Abdul
"Reminiscing"	2017	Aina Abdul	Aina Abdul
"Bukan Khayalan"	2017	Aina Abdul	Aina Abdul
"Mimpi Kita"	2017	Aina Abdul	Aina Abdul
"Ribut Hati" (OST Tombiruo: Penunggu Rimba)	2017	Raymund Wee	Gabriel Lynch
"Shadow"	2018	Aina Abdul	Aina Abdul
"Same Kind" (bersama Altimet dan Baraka Blue)	2018	Aina Abdul	Aina Abdul
"Sumpah"	2019	Aina Abdul	Aina Abdul
"Ghost" (feat. Spuds)	2019	Aina Abdul	Aina Abdul
"Kasih Suci" (OST Bu, Kasih Suci)	2019	Aina Abdul	Aina Abdul
"Semalam" (OST Mencari Kiblat Cinta)	2020	Aina Abdul	Aina Abdul
"Syahdu di Pagi Syawal" (Raya song)	2020	Aina Abdul	Aina Abdul
"Maybe"	2020	Aina Abdul	Aina Abdul
"Kelip-Kelip"	2020	Aina Abdul	Aina Abdul
"Nafas Cinta" (feat. Khai Bahar) (OST Kekasih Hati Mr Bodyguard)	2020	Aina Abdul, Khai Bahar	Aina Abdul, Wan Zakaria
"Trulooks" (Jingle for Cosmetic Product)	2021	Aina Abdul	Aina Abdul
"Sepi" (OST Sepi Tanpa Cinta)	2021	Aina Abdul	Aina Abdul, Wan Zakaria
"Syukur Lebaran" (Raya song)	2021	Aina Abdul	Aina Abdul
"Warna Warni" (feat. Daniesh Suffian Official Theme Song For Tonton TV3)	2021	Aina Abdul	Aina Abdul
"Nada Kalbu" (OST Masih Ada Rindu)	2021	Aisha Retno, Aina Abdul	Farouk Roman, Aina Abdul
"Tunggu Kamu" (feat. Lah Ahmad)	2021	Aina Abdul	Aina Abdul
"Aina Abdul"	2021	Aina Abdul	Aina Abdul
"Fool"	2021	Aina Abdul	Aina Abdul
"CahayaMu"	2022	Aina Abdul	Aina Abdul
"Gema Raya" (Raya song)	2022	Aina Abdul	Aina Abdul
"Terus Hidup"	2022	Aina Abdul	Aina Abdul
"Kasih Merintih" (OST Trinil)	2022	Aina Abdul	Aina Abdul
"I Lost Me"	2023	Aina Abdul	Aina Abdul
"Shoot"	2023	Aina Abdul	Aina Abdul
"Blue"	2023	Aina Abdul	Aina Abdul
"Berkunjung Di Hari Raya"	2023	Aina Abdul	Aina Abdul
"Puas Sudah"'	2023	Aina Abdul	Aina Abdul
"Tekad Perpaduan Penuhi Harapan" (feat. Khai Bahar)	2023	Affan Mazlan	Datuk Mokhzani Ismail
"Jangan Mati Rasa Itu"	2023	Aina Abdul	Aina Abdul
"Hati Ini Telah Dilukai 2.0" (feat. Ajai)	2024	Ajai, Nasser Abu Kassim	Ajai
"Raya Lagi Happening" (feat. Syafiq Kyle)	2024	Aina Abdul	Aina Abdul
"Kembara Nabawi"	2024	FJ Muzik	Anep Otwo, Alam Otwo & FJ Muzik
"Cinta Tak Pernah Tepat Waktu (feat. Fabio Asher)"	2024	Melly Goeslaw	Melly Goeslaw
"Kamu"	2024	Aina Abdul	Aina Abdul
"It Lies Within" (Predator League Official Theme Song)	2024	Gianina Camille Del Rosario	Jacob Raphael Yulo
"Jadi Ajar Aku	2024	Aina Abdul	Aina Abdul
"Our Land, Our Home"	2025	Datuk Mokhzani Ismail	Rafiza Rahman
"Arah Cinta Sejati"	2025	Hendro Djasmoro & Soundkestra	Hendro Djasmoro & Soundkestra
"Sesaat"	2025	Trakast, Fabio Asher, Yafi Aria	Trakast, Fabio Asher, Yafi Aria
"Ayuh Pulang"	2025	Aina Abdul & Amir Jahari	Aina Abdul & Amir Jahari
"Raya Kita"	2026	Haliza Husain	Yuri Edris
"Nikmat Beraya"	2026	Mage, Ja’a, Skylate & Ewal	Mage, Ja’a, Skylate & Ewal
"Ya Habibi Ya Aidilfitri"	2026	Aina Abdul, Zainur Irsyadi	Aina Abdul, Wan Saleh
"Berjauh-an"	2026	Aina Abdul	Aina Abdul
"Sadis"	2026	Aina Abdul	Aina Abdul
"Sang Penikam 2026 (feat. Aina Abdul)"	2026	Noh Salleh, Ade Paloh	Noh Salleh
"Joget Sarong"	2026	Shakkir Latiff, Aina Abdul	Shakkir Latiff, Nabil Zahan
"Kamu (AJL version)"	2026	Aina Abdul	Aina Abdul
"Bluest Sky"	2026	Aina Abdul	Aina Abdul

==== Compositions/works for other artists ====
Year	Title	Singer	Composer/Author
2021	Dusta Cinta	Elly Mazlein	Aina Abdul (C) Wan Zakaria (A)
2025	Peganglah Hati	Didie Shazry	Aina Abdul (CA)

== Concert and showcase ==
Year	Title	Type	Show	Date	Venue
2016	Aina Abdul & The Ground Passenger Showcase	Showcase	4	27 June	No Black Tie, Kuala Lumpur
2016	Aina Abdul & The Ground Passenger Showcase	Showcase	4	20 July	Forbidden City, Kuala Lumpur
2016	Aina Abdul & The Ground Passenger Showcase	Showcase	4	4 Aug	Forbidden City, Kuala Lumpur
2016	Aina Abdul & The Ground Passenger Showcase	Showcase	4	20 Sep	Forbidden City, Kuala Lumpur
2016	Aina Abdul & The Terence Ling Quartet	Showcase	1	17 Nov	Le Noir KL
2019	Aina Abdul A Night of Divas	Showcase	2	1 Mar	Alexis Bistro, Ampang
2019	Aina Abdul A Night of Divas	Showcase	2	2 Mar	Alexis Bistro, Ampang
2021	A Night with Aina Abdul 1.0	Concert	2	16 Dec	The Platform, Menara Ken TTDI
2021	A Night with Aina Abdul 1.0	Concert	2	17 Dec	The Platform, Menara Ken TTDI
2022	A Night with Aina Abdul 2.0	Concert	2	25 June	Istana Budaya, Kuala Lumpur
2022	A Night with Aina Abdul 2.0	Concert	2	26 June	Istana Budaya, Kuala Lumpur
2023	A Night with Aina Abdul UniEdition	Concert	1	17 June	Dewan Tunku Canselor, Universiti Malaya, KL
2023	A Night with Aina Abdul 3.0	Concert	1	18 Nov	Axiata Arena, Bukit Jalil
2024	A Night with Aina Abdul, Live in Singapore	Concert	1	6 Jan	The Theatre at Mediacorp, Singapore
2024	Aina Abdul bersama Malaysian Philharmonic Orchestra	Concert	2	10 May	Dewan Filharmonik Petronas, Kuala Lumpur
2024	Aina Abdul bersama Malaysian Philharmonic Orchestra	Concert	2	11 May	Dewan Filharmonik Petronas, Kuala Lumpur
2024	Aina Abdul's Lounge	Showcase	2	23 Aug	Liberal Latté, KL
2024	Aina Abdul's Lounge	Showcase	2	25 Aug	Liberal Latté, KL
2024	Aina Abdul: Imaji Tour	Concert	3	14 Dec	Arena Gemilang, DeTAR Putra (UNIMAS), Kuching, Sarawak
2024	Aina Abdul: Imaji Tour	Concert	3	27 Dec	Zepp KL
2025	Aina Abdul: Imaji Tour	Concert	3	11 Jan	Dewan Mu'adzam Shah (UUM) Sintok, Kedah
2026	Tak Berjauh-an Lagi #cafeseries	Showcase	1	19 Jul	Fifty Seven Coffee, B24 Rinching Hilir, Selangor
2026	Therapy Session with Aina Abdul	Showcase	1	15 Oct	Jao Tim KL
2027	Aina Abdul with the MPO 2.0	Concert	1	17 Apr	Dewan Filharmonik Petronas, Kuala Lumpur

As Guest Artist
Year	Concert / Showcase	Date	Venue	Main Artist
2022	Konsert Nafas Cinta	12 Feb	PJPAC, Malaysia	Khai Bahar
2022	Ungu The Greatest Night	22 Oct	The Star Theatre, Singapore	Ungu
2022	A Night To Remember	18-19 Nov	Persada Johor, Malaysia	Siti Nurhaliza
2023	25 Years Lah Ahmad Live In Concert	28 Jan	PJPAC, Malaysia	Lah Ahmad
2023	Cakra Khan : A Decade	17 Feb	Plenary Hall KLCC, Malaysia	Cakra Khan
2023	Konsert Malam Amal	7 Oct	Kompleks JKKN Negeri Sembilan, Malaysia	Rabbani
2024	I Am Here	22 June	Megastar Arena Kuala Lumpur, Malaysia	Ailee
2024	Destiny of Music	29 June	Dewan Agung Tuanku Canselor, UiTM Shah Alam, Malaysia	Various
2024	Konsert By Ajai Mega Friends 1.0	3 Aug	Megastar Arena Kuala Lumpur, Malaysia	Ajai
2024	Hal Hebat @ Kuala Lumpur	31 Oct	ZEPP Kuala Lumpur, Malaysia	Govinda
2024	MPO Benefit Concert : Resonance for a Reason	9 Nov	Dewan Filharmonik Petronas, Malaysia	Various
2025	Konsert By Ajai Mega Friends 2.0	10 May	The Star Theatre, Singapore	Ajai
2025	Ada Apa Dengan Melly..? PROM NITE	31 May	Axiata Arena Kuala Lumpur, Malaysia	Melly Goeslaw
2025	ASEAN Friendship Concert 2025	18 Oct	Auditorium Seri Angkasa, Malaysia	Various
2025	Chanson de Kuala Lumpur: Noh Salleh & the Malaysian Philharmonic Orchestra	1 Nov	Dewan Filharmonik PETRONAS, Malaysia	Noh Salleh
2026	SERAYA : Intimate Concert & Iftar Bersama	1 Mar	Jakarta, Indonesia	Fadhilah Intan
2026	Aku Cinta Padamu Siti Nurhaliza 30 Tahun	22 Mar	Angkasapuri Kota Media, Malaysia	Siti Nurhaliza
2026	The Last Kopek Senariounion 30 Tahun	25 Apr	Idea Live Arena, Malaysia	Senario
2026	Cadenza of the Soul : Noh Salleh with Aubrey Suwito Orchestra	8 Nov	Idea Live Arena, Malaysia	Noh Salleh

== Awards and recognition ==
Year	Award	Category	Recipient/Nominated Work	Result
2014	World Championship of Performing Arts (WCOPA) @ Los Angeles, A.S.	Vocalist of The World	Herself	Won
2018	Anugerah Telenovela (2018)	Best OST	Ribut Hati	Won
2019	Anugerah Bintang Popular Berita Harian ke-32	Popular New Female Artist	Herself	Finalist
2020	Anugerah Bintang Popular Berita Harian ke-33	Popular Female Singer	Herself	Finalist
2020	Anugerah Juara Lagu Ke-34	Open	"Sumpah"	Finalist
2021	Anugerah Bintang Popular Berita Harian ke-34	Popular Collaboration/Duo/Group Artist	"Nafas Cinta" feat Khai Bahar	Won
2021	Anugerah Juara Lagu ke-35	Song of The Year (2nd Place)	Singer for Semalam	Won
2021	Anugerah Juara Lagu ke-35	Song of The Year (2nd Place)	Composer for Semalam	Won
2021	Anugerah Juara Lagu ke-35	Song of The Year (2nd Place)	Lyricist for Semalam	Won
2022	Anugerah Juara Lagu ke-36	Best Vocal Award	Herself through "Sepi"	Won
2022	Anugerah Juara Lagu ke-36	Popular Singer of Choice Oppo AJL	"Nafas Cinta" feat Khai Bahar	Won
2022	Anugerah Industri Muzik (AIM23)	Best Female Vocal	"Nada Kalbu"	Finalist
2022	Anugerah Industri Muzik (AIM23)	Best Collaboration/Duo	"Tunggu Kamu" feat Lah Ahmad	Finalist
2023	Anugerah Juara Lagu ke-37	Song of The Year	Singer for Terus Hidup	Won
2023	Anugerah Juara Lagu ke-37	Song of The Year	Composer for Terus Hidup	Won
2023	Anugerah Juara Lagu ke-37	Song of The Year	Lyricist for Terus Hidup	Won
2023	Anugerah Juara Lagu ke-37	Best Vocal Award	Herself through "Terus Hidup"	Won
2023	Tonton Anugerah Drama Sangat 2023	Best OST (Mr Bodyguard's Lover)	"Nafas Cinta" feat Khai Bahar	Won
2023	Anugerah Bintang Popular Berita Harian ke-35	Popular Female Singer	Herself	Won
2023	Anugerah Bintang Popular Berita Harian ke-35	Extra: The Most Booming Song	Terus Hidup	Won
2024	Anugerah KNKV Viral Award 2024	Best Diva Award	Herself	Won
2024	Gempak Most Wanted Awards 2023	Most Amazing Song/Audio Award	"Jangan Mati Rasa Itu"	Won
2024	Anugerah Juara Lagu ke-38	Song of the year (3rd Place)	Singer for "Jangan Mati Rasa Itu"	Won
2024	Anugerah Juara Lagu ke-38	Song of the year (3rd Place)	Composer for "Jangan Mati Rasa Itu"	Won
2024	Anugerah Juara Lagu ke-38	Song of the year (3rd Place)	Lyricist for "Jangan Mati Rasa Itu"	Won
2024	Anugerah Juara Lagu ke-38	Best Vocal Award	Herself through "Jangan Mati Rasa Itu"	Won
2024	Anugerah Juara Lagu ke-38	Alha Alfa Choice Award	Herself	Won
2024	Anugerah Ikon Melodi 2024	Open	Herself	Won
2024	Anugerah Bintang Popular Berita Harian ke-36	Popular Female Singer	Herself	Won
2024	Anugerah Bintang Popular Berita Harian ke-36	Extra: The Most Booming Song	"Jangan Mati Rasa Itu"	Finalist
2024	Anugerah Bintang Popular Berita Harian ke-36	Most Popular Star (Artist of The Year)	Herself	Won
2025	NONA Superwoman Award 2024	NONA Celebrity Award	Herself	Won
2025	Anugerah Juara Lagu ke-39	Best Performance Award	Herself	Won
2025	Anugerah Juara Lagu ke-39	Unifi Mobile Choice Award	Herself through "Puas Sudah"	Won
2025	Gempak Most Wanted Awards 2024	Best Song/Audio	"Cinta Tak Pernah Tepat Waktu"	Won
2025	Gempak Most Wanted Awards 2024	Best Music Video	"Puas Sudah"	Finalist
2025	Gempak Most Wanted Awards 2024	Best Digital Program	"Confession Bilik Gelap feat Aina Abdul"	Finalist
2025	Anugerah Melodi Terhangat 2025	Hottest & Most Popular Music Celebrities	Herself	Finalist
2025	Anugerah Melodi Terhangat 2025	Hottest Iconic Celebrities	Herself	Finalist
2025	Anugerah Meletop ERA 2025	Group/Duo Meletop Era	"Cinta Tak Pernah Tepat Waktu"	TBA
2025	Anugerah Industri Muzik ke-24	Best Album	IMAJI	Finalist
2025	Anugerah Industri Muzik ke-24	Best Album	IMAJI (Deluxe Edition)	Finalist
2025	Anugerah Industri Muzik ke-24	Best Vocal Performance in a Song (Female)	"Jangan Mati Rasa Itu"	Won
2025	Anugerah Industri Muzik ke-24	Best Pop Song	"Jangan Mati Rasa Itu"	Won
2025	Anugerah Industri Muzik ke-24	Best Soundtrack (OST) in a Film/Drama	"Kasih Merintih"	Finalist
2025	Anugerah Industri Muzik ke-24	Best Collaboration between Local Artists and Foreign Artists/Composers	"Cinta Tak Pernah Tepat Waktu" / duet with Fabio Asher, composed by Melly Goeslaw	Finalist
2025	Anugerah Industri Muzik ke-24	Best Album/Single Cover	"Jangan Mati Rasa Itu"	Finalist
2025	Anugerah Industri Muzik ke-24	Best Album Recording	IMAJI (Deluxe Edition)	Won
2025	Anugerah Industri Muzik ke-24	Best Song Recording	Kamu (2024 Remaster)	Finalist
2025	Anugerah Industri Muzik ke-24	Song of The Year	"Jangan Mati Rasa Itu"	Won
2025	Anugerah Bintang Popular Berita Harian ke-37	Popular Female Singer	Herself	Finalist
2026	Anugerah Industri Pelancongan 2026	Celebrity of The Year 2026	Herself	Won
2026	Anugerah Juara Lagu ke-40	Song of The Year	Singer for "Kamu"	Finalist
2026	Anugerah Juara Lagu ke-40	Song of The Year	Composer for "Kamu"	Finalist
2026	Anugerah Juara Lagu ke-40	Song of The Year	Lyricist for "Kamu"	Finalist
2026	Anugerah Juara Lagu ke-40	Best Performance	"Kamu"	Won
2026	Anugerah Juara Lagu ke-40	Shopee Choice Artist Icon	"Kamu"	Won
2026	Eurovision Song Contest Asia 2026	Results of the contest	"Bluest Sky"	4th Place
2026	Anugerah Industri Muzik ke-25	Best Vocal Performance in a Song (Duo / Collaboration)	Ayuh Pulang (with Amir Jahari)	TBA
2026	Anugerah Industri Muzik ke-25	Best Unity Song	ASEAN : Our Land, Our Home	TBA
2026	Anugerah Industri Muzik ke-25	Best Collaboration with International Artistes/Composers	Sesaat	TBA

Awards and achievements
Preceded by None	Malaysia in the Eurovision Song Contest Asia; 2026	Succeeded by TBD
