= Woody Milintachinda =

Thai TV host (born 1976)

- Milintachinda in 2026
- Born: Vuthithorn Milintachinda; 25 November 1976 (age 49); Bangkok, Thailand
- Other name: Woody
- Occupations: Content creator, TV and online content host, executive producer, President of Woody World Co., Ltd., YouTuber
- Spouse: Akkharaphol Chabchitrchaidol (m. 2025)
- Website: www.youtube.com/user/woodytalkchannel

Vuthithorn "Woody" Milintachinda (Thai: วุฒิธร มิลินทจินดา; born 25 November 1976) is a Thai content creator, television and online content host, and executive producer.

He is the founder of music and entertainment events such as the S2O Music Festival, The Bangkok Countdown, and Circuit Asia, as well as Thailand’s first health and fitness festival, FIT FEST.

In his diverse roles in entertainment and media as DJ, VJ, TV host, actor, and producer, Woody has represented Thailand in interviews with figures and celebrities including the Dalai Lama Tenzin Gyatso and David Beckham.

== Early life and education ==
He graduated from a high school in New York City and then moved back to Thailand to finish his bachelor's degree from Thammasat University (major in International Economics) and master's degree from Chulalongkorn University (major in Mass Communication). Woody's father, Piamsak Milintachinda, is an ambassador, while his brother Pulin Milintachinda is a former diplomat.

== Career ==
His career started in 2000; he joined 88 Peak FM as the nation's first bilingual DJ. In 2003, he became a VJ at MTV Thailand. In 2004, Woody founded his own company under the name Double U Network Co., Ltd. In 2009 it was renamed Woody World Co., Ltd. Woody not only acts as president of the company but also as a host of its shows. Woody's television hosting credits include The One, Music X-Change, I-DNA, MTV's Just Arrived, Unseen TV, Pak Tor Pak, and MTV Just Talk. However, his most successful show is The Woody Show or Woody Kerd Ma Kui (Thai: วู้ดดี้ เกิดมาคุย) which was aired in early 2008. Though not a conventional talk show, it would lead the audience to unexpected stories about celebrities that might not be told anywhere else. The Woody Show aired every Sunday night at 10:30 pm on Channel 9, Modernine TV, Thailand's leading terrestrial network.

In 2010, Woody started to produce a show called Woody Daily or Chao Doo Woody (Thai: เช้าดูวู้ดดี้) (since renamed to Wake Up to Talk or Tuen Ma Kuii, Thai: ตื่นมาคุย) which airs 5 days a week at 8:00 to 8:45 am on Channel 9, Modernine TV. It differs from his previous shows in that he discussed daily "talk of the town".

In a notable episode, Milintachinda interviewed Princess Chulabhorn Walailak, the youngest daughter of King Bhumibol Adulyadej. The interview, which received advance coverage in local newspapers, was one of the princess's few talk show appearances. During the broadcast on Channel 9, Princess Chulabhorn discussed the demands of royal duties.

In September 2026, Milintachinda was announced as one of the two hosts of the Eurovision Song Contest Asia, alongside Cindy Bishop. The contest was held in Bangkok, Thailand, on the 14th of November.

=== Show Host: TV and Online ===
Year	Thai title	Title	Network	Notes	With
2017–present	คนแปลงร่าง		YouTuber:WOODY, คนแปลงร่าง		
2020–present	วู้ดดี้ โชว์	WOODY SHOW	7HD35		

== Personal life ==
In 2016, Woody revealed in his talk show that he was gay and he married his long-term boyfriend two years prior, which initially brought huge backlash of homophobia.
