= Laos in the Eurovision Song Contest Asia =

Laos in the Eurovision Song Contest Asia 2026
- Eurovision Song Contest Asia 2026
- Participating broadcaster: Vientiane Capital Television (VTE9)
- Country: Laos
- Selection process: Artist: Internal selection Song: Sieng Lao: The One
- Selection date: Artist: 13 September 2026; Song: 24 September 2026

Competing entry
- Song: "Bae"
- Artist: Thinla
- Songwriters: Donutdropit; Johan Gustafsson; Rebbi James; Sam Intharaphithak; Thinlamphone Mahavong

Placement
- Final result: 5th, 139 points

Participation chronology

Laos was represented at the Eurovision Song Contest Asia 2026 with the song "Bae", written by Donutdropit, Johan Gustafsson, Rebbi James, Sam Intharaphithak, and Thinlamphone Mahavong, and performed by Mahavong herself under her stage name Thinla. The Lao participating broadcaster, Vientiane Capital Television (VTE9), internally selected Thinla as its representative and organised the national final Sieng Lao: The One to determine its entry for the contest.

== Background ==
On 31 March 2026, alongside the official announcement of the Eurovision Song Contest Asia, Lao broadcaster Vientiane Capital Television (VTE9) was named as one of ten provisional participants, representing Laos. On 4 August 2026, it was revealed that the entry would be selected through Sieng Lao: The One.

== Before Eurovision Asia ==
=== Sieng Lao: The One ===
Sieng Lao: The One logo

Sieng Lao: The One was the competition organized by VTE9 to select its entry for the Eurovision Song Contest Asia 2026. The final was held on 23 September 2026, with the results announced on 24 September 2026. On 13 September 2026, the European Broadcasting Union (EBU) announced that Laos will be represented by Thinla, with snippets of the competing songs released on 16 September 2026, and the full versions released on the following day.

==== Competing entries ====
Sieng Lao: The One songs
Song	Songwriter(s)
"Bae"	Donutdropit; Johan Gustafsson; Rebbi James; Sam Intharaphithak; Thinlamphone Mahavong
"Star"	Anders Gukko; AP The Tripper; Hugo Andersson; Moa Pettersson Hammar; Winmanee Xaiyalard
"Water"	Andraws Yousef; Fries & Soda; Maria Marcus; Senju; Thinlamphone Mahavong; Winmanee Xaiyalard

==== Final ====
The final took place on 23 September 2026 at 20:30 ICT, and the results show took place on 24 September 2026 at the same hour.

Sieng Lao: The One final
R/O	Song	Place		
R/O	Song	Place	1	"Star"
2	"Bae"	1		
3	"Water"			

== At Eurovision Asia ==
Thinla at Eurovision Song Contest Asia

The Eurovision Song Contest Asia took place at the One Bangkok Forum in Bangkok on 14 November 2026.

=== Performance ===
For her performance of "Bae", Thinla was joined on stage by four dancers. The performance also featured a bench like prop.

=== Voting ===
==== Points awarded by Laos ====
Points awarded by Laos
Points	Televote	Jury
12 points		Philippines
10 points		Malaysia
8 points		Mongolia
7 points		Vietnam
6 points		Bhutan
5 points		Thailand
4 points		South Korea
3 points		Cambodia
2 points		Bangladesh
1 point		Nepal

== Participation overview ==
Table key
†	Upcoming event

Participation history
Year	Artist	Song	Language	Final	Points
2026	Thinla	"Bae"	English, Lao	5	139
