= Kik (band) =

South Korean rock band

- Origin: South Korea
- Years active: 2025–present
- Label: MPMG
- Members: Wooseok; Jung Min-hyuk; Oh Myung-seok
- Website: mpmgmusic.com/kik

Kik (Korean: 킥; stylized in all caps) is South Korean rock band formed by Wooseok and managed by MPMG Music. The band consists of Wooseok, Jung Min-hyuk, and Oh Myung-seok. They debuted on June 30, 2025, with their self-titled EP.

== History ==
=== Pre-debut ===
In 2018, Oh Myung-seok and Jung Min-hyuk met at a music performance in their respective bands, SURL and Lacuna, and subsequently joined the same music label, Happy Robot Records (now MPMG Music), in 2019 and 2021, respectively.

In 2024, Lacuna and SURL met Wooseok on his show Night Radio in September and November, respectively. In March 2025, the three, who were of similar age, formed a project band based on the idea of "Let's try to start a new project" (새로운 무브먼트를 만들어 보자), and began creating songs together.

=== 2025: Introduction and debut ===
On May 25, Jung performed alongside Oh at MINT FESTA vol.77, where he mentioned an upcoming special collaboration stage with Wooseok—who was also present—at Beautiful Mint Life 2025. On June 15, they performed the pre-release track "Simple" at Beautiful Mint Life 2025 and announced their group name Kik, official social media accounts, and the dates for their mini-album release and debut showcase.

On June 24, Kik released a second pre-release track, "Captain's Order", on their YouTube channel. On June 30, the trio officially debuted with their first self-titled mini-album, and held their debut showcase at EDLS on the same day.

On September 2, they released the song "Ah", which was included in the Bright #14 compilation album. On November 9, they won the Best Newcomer Award at the GMF2025 Awards. On December 16, they released the single "Piece of Peace", in collaboration with the Thai band Dept.

=== 2026–present: Low Kik ===
On January 16, a preview of the second mini-album Low Kik was released, alongside an announcement regarding an Asia tour. It was officially released on January 18.

On August 14, 2026, the European Broadcasting Union (EBU) announced that Kik would compete in Korea's Next Wave. Their competing song "F1" was released nine days later.

== Discography ==
=== Extended plays ===
Title	Details	Peak chart positions	Sales
Title	Details	KOR	Sales
Kik	Released: June 30, 2025; Label: MPMG; Formats: CD, digital download, streaming	—	—
Low Kik	Released: January 18, 2026; Label: MPMG; Formats: CD, digital download, streaming	—	—
"—" denotes releases that did not chart or were not released in that region.
