= Melinda Looi =

Malaysian fashion designer

- 吕例霓
- Born: March 12, 1973 (age 53); Kuala Lumpur, Malaysia
- Occupation: Fashion designer
- Years active: 2000–present
- Organization: Mellooi Creation Sdn. Bhd.
- Known for: Couture, ready-to-wear, uniform design
- Children: 4
- Website: melindalooi.com

Melinda Looi (Chinese: 吕例霓; born 12 March 1973) is a Malaysian fashion designer. She works in couture, ready-to-wear, and uniform design, and served as president of the Malaysian Official Designers' Association (MODA) from 2019 to 2023.

== Early life and education ==
Looi was born in Kuala Lumpur to a family involved in garment manufacturing; her parents operated a pleating workshop known as "Pleats by Looi". She learned sewing and garment construction at an early age.

In 1995, she won the Malaysia Young Designer Award, which granted her a scholarship to study fashion at LaSalle College of the Arts in Montreal, Canada. After completing her studies, she worked briefly in costume design for television and film in Canada before returning to Malaysia.

Looi has four children.

== Career ==
=== Fashion lines ===
In 2000, Looi founded her namesake brand under Mellooi Creation Sdn. Bhd., launching both couture and ready-to-wear collections.

In 2003, she introduced a diffusion line, MELL, targeted at younger consumers.

=== Uniform design ===
In 2009, Looi expanded into uniform design through her label Uniform Atelier. Uniform Atelier has produced custom uniforms for hotels and corporate clients in Malaysia and overseas, such Hyatt Centric Kuala Lumpur.

In 2021, Looi was included in Tatler Asia’s “Asia’s Most Influential (Malaysia)”.

In 2024, Looi debuted a cultural-fusion collection featuring batik motifs and beadwork. Later that year, she collaborated with Penan artisans in Sarawak to create a rattan-based gown worn by singer Aina Abdul.

In 2025, Chinese actress Fan Bingbing wore a bespoke Baju Kurung designed by Looi for her Datukship conferment ceremony.
