= Eurovision Song Contest Asia =

International song competition

Eurovision Song Contest Asia 2026
- United by Music

Date and venue
- Final: 14 November 2026
- Venue: One Bangkok Forum; Bangkok, Thailand

Organisation
- Organiser: Voxovation
- Executive supervisor: Marcus Tang

Production
- Host broadcaster: Channel 3
- Producer: S2O Productions
- Director: Kijnop Promjinda
- Executive producers: Anders Lenhoff; Assaf Blecher; Christer Björkman; Lee Smithurst; Ola Melzig; Pulin Milintachinda; Apichart Satittammanoon
- Presenters: Woody Milintachinda; Cindy Bishop

Participants
- Number of entries: 11
- Debuting countries: Bangladesh; Bhutan; Cambodia; Laos; Malaysia; Mongolia; Nepal; Philippines; South Korea; Thailand; Vietnam
- Participation map: Competing countries

Vote
- Voting system: Each country awards two sets of 12, 10, 8–1 points to ten songs. Votes from viewers in non-participating countries are aggregated and awarded as one set of points.
- Winning song: Philippines "Sobra-Sobra"

The Eurovision Song Contest Asia (shortened as ESCA) is an international song competition modelled after the Eurovision Song Contest, where broadcasters from the Asia-Pacific region compete representing their countries. The inaugural edition, organised by Voxovation under licence from the European Broadcasting Union (EBU), produced by S2O Productions, and staged by host broadcaster Channel 3, was held on 14 November 2026 at One Bangkok Forum in Bangkok, Thailand, with broadcasters from eleven countries taking part.

Plans to adapt the Eurovision Song Contest for the Asia-Pacific region started in earnest in 2008. In 2016, Australia's Special Broadcasting Service (SBS) took on the project, developing a version of the format with Blink TV and the EBU for a planned debut in 2019. SBS shelved the project in 2021, and it was later handed over to Voxovation, a company created to develop adaptations of the contest format in different territories with licence from the EBU. No further updates were provided until 2025, when the Bhutan Broadcasting Service (BBS) aired a competition called Druk Dra, aimed at selecting its entry for a Eurovision Asia contest before Voxovation asked the broadcaster to halt it. On 31 March 2026, the EBU and Voxovation officially announced the competition, with Thailand as the host country and an initial lineup of ten participating countries, which was expanded to eleven in August 2026.

The winner of the inaugural edition was the Philippines with the song "Sobra-Sobra", performed by Carmelle and written by Gianina Camille del Rosario and Mart Sam Emmanuel Olavides. The song won both the jury and online vote. Thailand, Vietnam, Malaysia, and Laos completed the top five.

== Development ==
In September 2008, the European Broadcasting Union (EBU) announced plans for an Asia-Pacific counterpart to the Eurovision Song Contest, scheduled for 2009. By March 2009, the competition had been named Our Sound – The Asia Pacific Song Contest, and was scheduled to be held in the second half of the year. The contest was to be coordinated by the Singapore-based company Asiavision, led by German entrepreneur Andreas Gerlach, with broadcasters from 16 countries and regions slated to participate: Cambodia, China, Hong Kong, India, Indonesia, Japan, Laos, Macao, Malaysia, Pakistan, the Philippines, Singapore, South Korea, Taiwan, Thailand, and Vietnam. The contest was subsequently postponed several times and ultimately never materialised.

In March 2016, the EBU began development on an adaptation of the Eurovision Song Contest for the region with Special Broadcasting Service (SBS). SBS was working on the project with its production partner Blink TV. The first contest was scheduled to be held in Australia in 2017. The official name of the competition was revealed to be Eurovision Asia Song Contest (or simply Eurovision Asia) in August 2017. By May, Australia, Hong Kong and Singapore had shown interest in hosting the first edition of the contest. The Singaporean government put forward S$4 million to host the event, while the city of Sydney and the state of New South Wales said they would invest in hosting. The city council of Gold Coast claimed in November 2018 that the first contest would take place at the Gold Coast Convention and Exhibition Centre from 30 November to 7 December 2019. In May 2021, it was confirmed that SBS had shelved the project.

SBS's plans from May 2016 were for one broadcaster from each country in the Asia-Pacific region to be eligible to compete, meaning there would be a maximum of 68 participants. Membership in the Asia-Pacific Broadcasting Union (ABU) would not be a requirement for participation. By March 2019, the broadcasters from ten countries had confirmed their intention to participate: Australia, China, Japan, Kazakhstan, Maldives, New Zealand, Papua New Guinea, Solomon Islands, South Korea and Vanuatu. SBS confirmed its participation, while China, Japan and South Korea were named as potential participants.

In May 2025, the Bhutan Broadcasting Service (BBS) confirmed its intention to participate in Eurovision Asia, stating that the inaugural contest would be held in Bangkok, Thailand, with 18 countries participating. On 24 June, the EBU published its Brand Impact Report for the Eurovision Song Contest, listing an adaptation in Asia-Pacific as under "ongoing development". In August, the location was instead stated by BBS as Mumbai, India, as it began organising a national selection titled Druk Dra that same month to select its entry. Additionally, Ho Chi Minh City Television (HTV), which serves Vietnam's Ho Chi Minh City area, had initially allocated a timeslot for a programmed titled Eurovision Asia on 31 August. On 28 August, Martin Green, director of the Eurovision Song Contest, stated that "no plans have been confirmed or announced to date" for the contest in Asia-Pacific, further clarifying that Druk Dra was taken off air and deleted from online platforms at the request of the EBU's partners. In November, Marcus Tang was hired by Voxovation to serve as "Managing Director Asia". On 15 December, Christer Björkman, Head of Music and Founder at Voxovation, stated in the Eurovision Uncovered podcast that Eurovision Asia was ongoing "intensive preparations", with hopes of a public reveal "quite soon". In an interview, Green said that the national broadcasters in Asia-Pacific appreciated the contest as a way of giving a chance to national pop stars, portraying it as a "no-brainer". The name "Eurovision" was included in the title, despite the event consisting of Asian-Pacific participants, at the request of the prospective participating broadcasters.

== 2026 contest ==
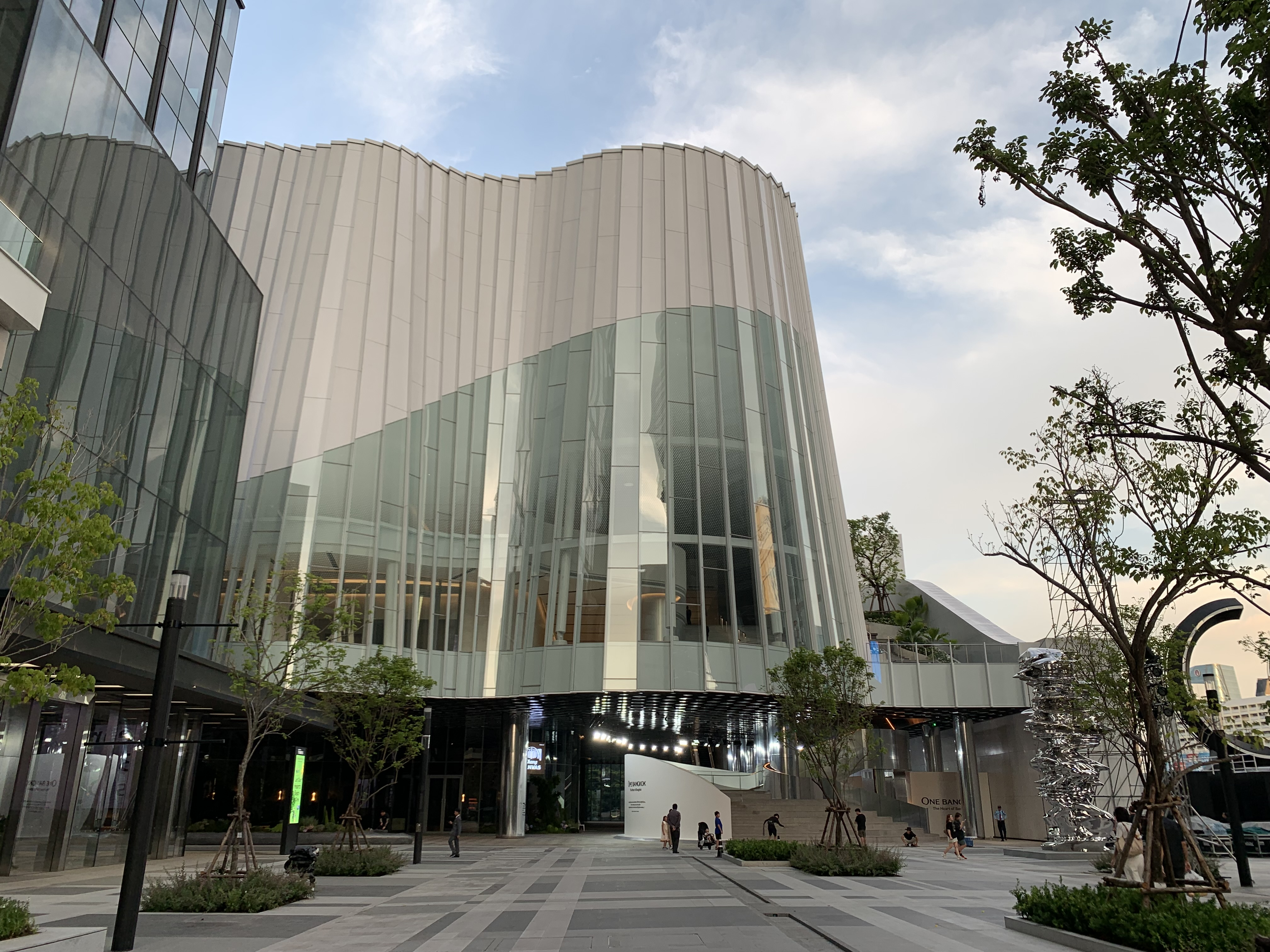
One Bangkok Forum, host venue of the contest

On 29 March 2026, a website was launched, claiming that the contest would take place on 14 November in Bangkok, provisionally featuring nine countries: Bangladesh, Bhutan, Cambodia, Laos, Malaysia, Nepal, the Philippines, Thailand, and Vietnam. The website was temporarily taken offline a few hours later. The contest was formally announced on 31 March under the name Eurovision Song Contest Asia, to be organised by the EBU and Voxovation with S2O Productions serving as partners, and Thailand's Channel 3 serving as the host broadcaster. The initial announcement listed ten countries (the aforementioned plus South Korea) alongside their respective participating broadcasters. Mongolia's participation was confirmed on 14 August.

=== Production and format ===
The stage in the arena.

On 31 March 2026, the EBU, Voxovation, and S2O Productions announced that the inaugural edition of the contest would be held on 14 November 2026 in Bangkok, Thailand; the venue was confirmed to be One Bangkok Forum on 21 September. Each competing entry must be under three minutes and performed by no more than six people. Participating broadcasters from all countries organised national finals to select their entries (Note: Laos, Mongolia, and Vietnam internally selected their artist, while their songs were determined via a national final.) except Malaysia, which used an internal selection instead. The winner would be invited to perform as a guest at the Eurovision Song Contest 2027 in Burgas, Bulgaria. The main trophy was a glass microphone with a golden upper part and with the logo of the competition. The trophy is styled in the same way as all the other trophies since 2008 at the Eurovision Song Contest.

Woody Milintachinda and Cindy Bishop, presenters of the Eurovision Song Contest Asia 2026.

Woody Milintachinda and Cindy Bishop were announced as the presenters of the show on 25 September. Preparations at the contest venue began on 2 November, with the construction of the main stage. The first rehearsals with the artists took place between 8 and 10 November, followed by the second rehearsals on 11 and 12 November. On 13 November, a clip containing 30-second snippets of each of the eleven competing acts’ rehearsal performances was released.

==== Postcards ====
The "postcards" are short video introductions shown on television while the stage is being prepared for the next entry. They were composed of footage shot by the participating artists through "selfie-mode", introducing the artists themselves and the country they represent. The postcards are inspired by the format of those from Eurovision Song Contest 2024.

==== Voting system ====
The official voting rules for the contest were released on 9 November 2026. The results were decided by a 50/50 split of professional jury voting and public voting. Viewers were able to vote up to eight times for free, and also cast up to 10 optional 'booster' votes. Every viewer was required to vote for at least three entries. As in the main Eurovision Song Contest, viewers in the participating countries were not allowed to vote for their own country. Viewers from non-participating countries were able to vote, with their votes being aggregated and presented as one individual set of points under "Rest of the World".

=== Participants ===
All 11 entrants on stage during the flag parade

Eligibility for participation in the contest covers both public service and privately-funded broadcasters in the Asian-Pacific region. The EBU has also confirmed that broadcasters taking part in the main Eurovision Song Contest will not be eligible to take part in the Asian-Pacific counterpart, meaning that those from countries in the Asian-Pacific region may not be able to take part whilst doing so in the main contest, such as SBS (Australia).

On 11 September 2026, broadcasters from 11 countries were announced to be participating in the inaugural edition. Prior to the contest, a digital compilation album featuring all the songs, except Thailand's entry, was put together by Voxovation and released by DAO Music Entertainment on 6 November.

Eurovision Song Contest Asia 2026 participants
Country	Broadcaster	Artist	Song	Language	Songwriter(s)	Ref.
Bangladesh	NTV	Beatmosphere	"Tumi ele" (তুমি এলে)	Bengali	Ishtiyak Zobayer; Khandaker Shams; Mahi Bin Ashraful; Moktadir Dewan; Sidratul Mursalin Bhasha	
Bhutan	BBS	Nyendra	"Lhayi semo" (ལྷ་ཡི་སྲས་མོ།)	Dzongkha	Lungten Wangchuk; Thukten Nyendra	
Cambodia	TV5	Monetrey	"I Let You Go"	English, Khmer	Monetrey Ek	
Laos	VTE9	Thinla	"Bae"	English, Lao	Donutdropit; Johan Gustafsson; Rebbi James; Sam Intharaphithak; Thinlamphone Mahavong	
Malaysia	Media Prima	Aina Abdul	"Bluest Sky"	English, Malay	Nurul Aina Abdul Ghani	
Mongolia	CNBC Mongolia	Beck	"Chamguigeer (Without You)" (Чамгүйгээр) (Note: Traditional Mongolian script: ᠴᠢᠮᠠᠭᠦᠢᠭᠡᠷ) (Note: In October 2026, "Chamguigeer" replaced Beck's originally selected song, "Light", after the latter was discovered to be ineligible because it had been promoted before 1 July 2026.)	Mongolian, English	B. Gankhurel; Dambyn Otgonbayar; Ganbatyn Munkhbayar	
Nepal	Himalaya TV	Pratik Himal Rai	"Ananta maya" (अनन्त माया)	Nepali	Pratik Himal Rai	
Philippines	ABS-CBN	Carmelle	"Sobra-Sobra"	English, Filipino	Gianina Camille del Rosario; Mart Sam Emmanuel Olavides	
South Korea	KT ENA	Junhee	"Deep Dive"	English	Alexaundra Christine Schneiderman; Jaehyuk Ryu; Notmixedyet; Park Junhee; Sarah Min	
Thailand	BEC World	Mang and Daou	"Glinratree (Aroma)" (กลิ่นราตรี)	Thai	Jaruwat Cheawaram; Nita Chavalit; Piyatida Lekklang; Vorapat Vongsukont; Worachet Thanupongcharat	
Vietnam	VTV	Tóc Tiên	"Em Tiên"	Vietnamese, English	Trần Thị Thu Hà; Phạm Khánh Dương	

=== Contest overview ===
Carmelle with her trophy at the winner's press conference

The event took place on 14 November 2026 at 20:30 ICT. Eleven countries participated, with the running order published on 29 October.

Dara and Jeff Satur performed as interval acts.

The show began with "Bangkok Sounds and Senses", an act showcasing the culture of the host city created by Pul Hui, followed by the flag parade, introducing the eleven competing artists who entered the stage in tuk tuks. Due to technical issues during Thinla's performance representing Laos, a recording of her jury show performance was shown after all eleven songs were performed. The interval acts included Eurovision Song Contest 2026 winner Dara performing a mashup of her new single "Bad Idea" and her winning song "Bangaranga", and Jeff Satur performing a medley of his songs "Black Tie" and "Grief Eaters".

The winner was the Philippines with the song "Sobra-Sobra", performed by Carmelle and written by Gianina Camille del Rosario and Mart Sam Emmanuel Olavides. The Philippines won both the jury and online vote, with host country Thailand, Vietnam, Malaysia, and Laos completing the top five.

R/O	Country	Artist	Song	Points	Place
1	Vietnam	Tóc Tiên	"Em Tiên"	164	3
2	Cambodia	Monetrey	"I Let You Go"	61	10
3	Laos	Thinla	"Bae"	139	5
4	Mongolia	Beck	"Chamguigeer (Without You)"	94	8
5	Bhutan	Nyendra	"Lhayi semo"	126	6
6	Philippines	Carmelle	"Sobra-Sobra"	211	1
7	Bangladesh	Beatmosphere	"Tumi ele"	35	11
8	Thailand	Mang and Daou	"Glinratree (Aroma)"	170	2
9	South Korea	Junhee	"Deep Dive"	113	7
10	Nepal	Pratik Himal Rai	"Ananta maya"	69	9
11	Malaysia	Aina Abdul	"Bluest Sky"	152	4

==== Spokespersons ====
The following spokespersons announced the top three scores from each country's national jury:

1. Philippines – Vice Ganda
2. Bhutan – Kelzang Dolkar
3. Vietnam – Đức Bảo
4. Mongolia – Ani Munkhbat
5. Bangladesh – Azwad Mostafiz Ador
6. South Korea – Jo Kwon
7. Laos – Tot Lina
8. Malaysia – Nurin Razmyn
9. Cambodia – MC Davuth
10. Nepal – Roneeshma Shrestha
11. Thailand – Maneenuch Smerasut

=== Detailed voting results ===
Split results
Place	Combined		Jury		Online	
Place	Country	Points	Country	Points	Country	Points
1	Philippines	211	Philippines	93	Philippines	118
2	Thailand	170	Vietnam	83	Thailand	108
3	Vietnam	164	Malaysia	82	Vietnam	81
4	Malaysia	152	Thailand	62	Laos	78
5	Laos	139	Laos	61	Bhutan	71
6	Bhutan	126	South Korea	61	Malaysia	70
7	South Korea	113	Mongolia	57	South Korea	52
8	Mongolia	94	Bhutan	55	Mongolia	37
9	Nepal	69	Nepal	35	Nepal	34
10	Cambodia	61	Cambodia	33	Cambodia	28
11	Bangladesh	35	Bangladesh	16	Bangladesh	19

Detailed jury voting results of the Eurovision Song Contest Asia 2026
Voting procedure used: 100% jury vote 100% online vote		Total score	Jury vote score	Online vote score	Jury vote										
Voting procedure used: 100% jury vote 100% online vote		Total score	Jury vote score	Online vote score	Philippines	Bhutan	Vietnam	Mongolia	Bangladesh	South Korea	Laos	Malaysia	Cambodia	Nepal	Thailand
Contestants	Vietnam	164	83	81	7	10		7	6	6	7	6	10	12	12
Contestants	Cambodia	61	33	28	1	5	8	1	3	1	3	7		3	1
Contestants	Laos	139	61	78	6	8	12	3	10	5		4	4	2	7
Contestants	Mongolia	94	57	37	3	4	10		5	4	8	8	5	5	5
Contestants	Bhutan	126	55	71	4		6	5	1	7	6	12	7	4	3
Contestants	Philippines	211	93	118		12	4	10	12	12	12	3	12	10	6
Contestants	Bangladesh	35	16	19	2	1	1	2		3	2	1	1	1	2
Contestants	Thailand	170	62	108	8	7	5	6	8	8	5	5	2	8	
Contestants	South Korea	113	61	52	10	3	7	8	7		4	2	6	6	8
Contestants	Nepal	69	35	34	5	2	2	4	2	2	1	10	3		4
Contestants	Malaysia	152	82	70	12	6	3	12	4	10	10		8	7	10

12 points awarded by juries
#	Recipient	Countries giving 12 points
5	Philippines	Bangladesh, Bhutan, Cambodia, Laos, South Korea
2	Malaysia	Mongolia, Philippines
2	Vietnam	Nepal, Thailand
1	Bhutan	Malaysia
1	Laos	Vietnam

=== Broadcasts ===
Each participating broadcaster aired the contest live nationally, and the EBU streamed it internationally on its Eurovision Song Contest YouTube channel. Tommy Hatto provided English-language commentary for broadcasters that offered second audio programs. The tables below detail the broadcasting plans and commentators for the countries that aired the contest.

In Malaysia, TV3 censored the opening number by replacing the close-ups of Thai drag performers with wide shots taken from rehearsals and obscured the Filipino spokesperson Vice Ganda during the jury voting sequence to comply with local regulations; Malaysian broadcasting laws heavily restrict content that is viewed as promoting or normalising LGBTQ lifestyles. Martin Green said that the EBU was "surprised and disappointed" that the broadcast was altered in Malaysia, and that the union would write to Voxovation to seek clarification. He also said that the censorship appeared to be isolated to the Malaysian broadcast, and all other transmissions were not altered. Voxovation stated that it was asking TV3 to establish the circumstances, and that they were working to make sure this doesn't happen again. In Vietnam, also with strict censorship laws, VTV3 broadcast the show with a 10-minute delay.

Broadcasts and commentators in participating countries
Country	Broadcaster	Channel(s)	Commentator(s)	Ref.
Bangladesh	NTV		No commentary	
Bhutan	BBS	BBS 2	English: Tommy Hatto	
Cambodia	Sabay Digital	Sabay News on Facebook	No commentary	
Cambodia	Sabay Digital	Kanha on Facebook	No commentary	
Laos	VTE9		English: Tommy Hatto	
Laos	VTE9		Lao: Lanny Pnó	
Malaysia	Media Prima	TV3	No commentary	
Mongolia	CNBC Mongolia (Note: Broadcast started at 22:04 Eastern Mongolia Time, missing the first 34 minutes of the show and the performance of the Mongolian entry.)		No commentary	
Mongolia	MNC		No commentary	
Nepal	Himalaya TV		No commentary	
Philippines	ABS-CBN	All TV, A2Z, Kapamilya Channel, Myx, (Note: Delayed broadcast) TFC	No commentary	
South Korea	KT ENA	ENA	Lee Ye-na, Yoonhan and Oh Myung-seok	
Thailand	BEC World	Channel 3	Varin Sachdev	
Vietnam	VTV	VTV3 (Note: Broadcast with a 10-minute delay.)	Thái Trang, Ngọc Huy and Phí Linh	

Broadcasts and commentators in non-participating countries
Country	Broadcaster	Channel	Commentator	Ref.
Australia	SBS	SBS2 (Note: Live broadcast on SBS On Demand, with a delayed television broadcast on SBS2 on 15 November 2026)	Courtney Act	
Israel	IPBC	Kan 11	Asaf Liberman and Elad Bar-Noy	
Poland	TVP	TVP2	Artur Orzech	
Sweden	SR	Sverigesradio.se	Björn Kjellman and Carolina Norén	

== Future ==
Christer Björkman stated that discussions about the next edition of Eurovision Asia will begin a week after the inaugural contest, with China, Hong Kong, Japan, Kazakhstan, and Taiwan reportedly showing interest in competing in future editions.

On 18 and 19 November 2026, Bangladesh and Mongolia expressed their intentions to participate in a potential 2027 edition of the contest.

== See also ==
- Eurovision Song Contest 2026
- Junior Eurovision Song Contest 2026
- Eurovision Young Musicians 2026
