= Mebisa =

Mebisa མེ་སྦི་ས་ Chukha, Chhukha
- Town
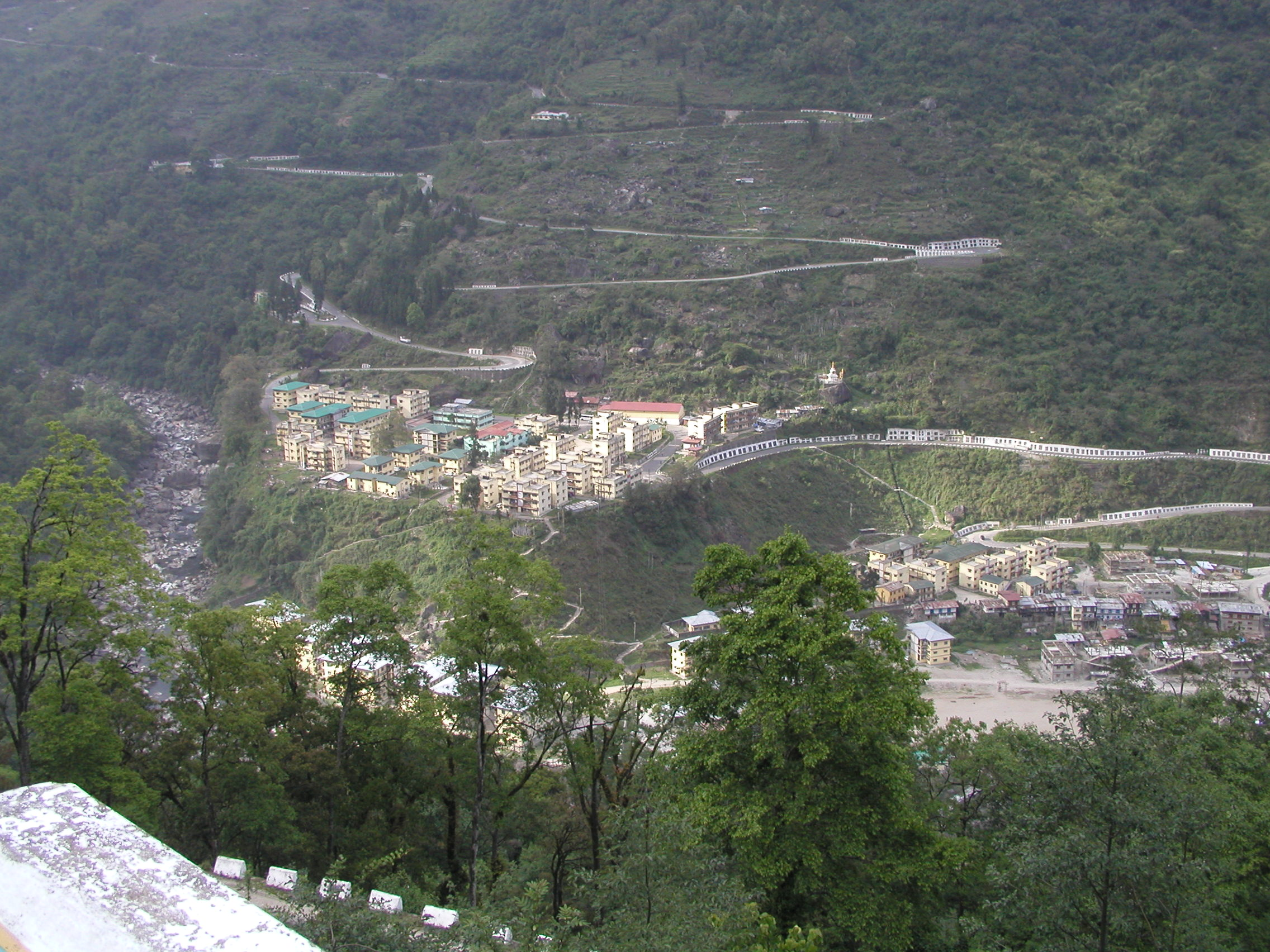
- View of Mebisa (Chukha), Bhutan

- Location in Bhutan
- Coordinates: 27°4′N 89°35′E
- Country: Bhutan
- Dzongkhag: Chhukha District
- Gewog: Bjacho Gewog

Population (2005)
  - Total: 2,855
- Time zone: UTC+6 (BTT)

Mebisa, formerly called Chukha or Chhukha, is a town on the Wang Chu River and seat of the Chukha District in Bhutan. In 2005, it had a population of 2,855 (2005 census).

== Notable people ==
- Nyendra - singer
