= Philippines in the Eurovision Song Contest Asia =

Philippines in the Eurovision Song Contest Asia 2026
- Eurovision Song Contest Asia 2026
- Participating broadcaster: ABS-CBN
- Country: Philippines
- Selection process: Philippine Selection Night
- Selection date: 30 August 2026

Competing entry
- Song: "Sobra-Sobra"
- Artist: Carmelle
- Songwriters: Gianina Camille del Rosario; Mart Sam Emmanuel Olavides

Placement
- Final result: 1st, 211 points

Participation chronology

The Philippines was represented at the Eurovision Song Contest Asia 2026 with the song "Sobra-Sobra", written by Gianina Camille del Rosario and Mart Sam Emmanuel Olavides, and performed by Carmelle. The Philippine participating broadcaster, ABS-CBN, organized the national final Philippine Selection Night to select its entry for the contest. The song ultimately won the contest with 211 points.

== Background ==
=== Our Sound – The Asia-Pacific Song Contest (2010) ===
Before the establishment of the Eurovision Song Contest Asia, the Philippines was slated to participate in an earlier attempt at an Asia-Pacific spin-off of the Eurovision Song Contest. In September 2008, the European Broadcasting Union (EBU) announced the sale of format rights for an Asian version of the contest. Originally titled the Asiavision Song Contest before being rebranded as Our Sound – The Asia-Pacific Song Contest, the event was initially scheduled for late 2009. The Philippines was officially listed as one of the thirteen competing countries in the rescheduled March 2010 contest, planned to be held in Macau.

In preparation for the inaugural competition, the Philippine participating broadcaster, GMA, began organizing a national selection process. By November 2009, GMA had begun promoting the contest and encouraging local singers to apply through a segment of its Sunday noontime variety show, SOP Fully Charged. Despite these early preparations and further planned delays to relocate the event to Mumbai on 26–28 November 2010, the Our Sound project continued to face setbacks. The contest was ultimately postponed indefinitely in 2011 due to issues between the private organizers and the EBU, which halted the Philippines' regional début.

=== Eurovision Song Contest Asia (2026) ===
On 31 March 2026, the EBU revealed that the Philippines, represented by ABS-CBN, would compete in the inaugural edition of the Eurovision Song Contest Asia. On 17 May 2026, at a Eurovision Song Contest 2026 grand final live viewing party in Manila, Star Music Head Roxy Liquigan announced that ABS-CBN would hold a national selection in August 2026. On 4 August, it was announced that the Philippine entry would be selected through the Philippine Selection Night on 30 August.

== Before Eurovision Asia ==
=== Philippine Selection Night ===
Philippine Selection Night logo

The Philippine Selection Night, also known as Pili, Pinas!, (Note: Tagalog: [ˈpiː.lɪʔ pɪˈn̪as]; transl. Choose, Philippines!) was the competition organized by ABS-CBN to select its entry for the Eurovision Song Contest Asia 2026. The final took place on 30 August 2026 at the New Frontier Theater and featured 10 competing artists. The result was determined by the combination of votes from a professional jury (40%), consisting of Nonoy Tan, Vina Morales, Angeline Quinto, Joane Laygo, Jed Madela, Choi Padilla, and Louie Ocampo, a Filipino public vote (40%), and international public vote (20%).

==== Competing acts ====
On 10 August 2026, ABS-CBN announced the titles of their 10 songs for the contest, as well as their songwriters, and revealed their performers on the following day. Fifteen-second snippets of the songs were released on 12 August, and the full songs were released on 17 August.

Artist(s)	Song	Songwriter(s)
AJAA	"Make It Exist"	Angelo Calucin
Carmelle	"Sobra-Sobra"	Gianina Camille del Rosario; Mart Sam Emmanuel Olavides
DNA	"Between Bituin"	Proceso Gideon Marcelo Jr.
Elha Nympha, Esang de Torres, Lance Reblando and Nar Cabico	"Cheri(e)"	Russ Narcies Cabico
Jason Dy and Sassa Dagdag	"Di Yan (Red Flag)"	Jason Marvin Hernandez
JM Dela Cerna and Marielle Montellano	"Mapadama"	Proceso Gideon Marcelo Jr.; Jeremy Eriq Glinoga
Khimo	"Reason to Live"	Stephen Tan
Ryssi Avila	"Good for You"	Hazel Faith de la Cruz-Santos
Saga	"Broken Beyond Repair"	Daniel Angelo Gonzales
Vvink feat. Wrive Russu	"Round n' Round"	Julius James de Belen; John Michael Conchada

==== Final ====
The final took place on 30 August 2026 at 21:45 PhST at the New Frontier Theater in Quezon City, and was hosted by Vice Ganda, Darren Espanto and Alexa Ilacad. The competition was broadcast live on Kapamilya Channel, All TV, A2Z and The Filipino Channel (with a delayed telecast on Myx), and streamed online on iWant, Kapamilya Online Live (through Facebook and YouTube) and the official Eurovision Song Contest YouTube channel.

In addition to the competing acts, the contest was opened by the hosts, Klarisse de Guzman, Lyka Estrella, Bryan Chong, Reiven Umali, Ian Manibale, Miah and Azter performing a common song for the contest, "Mabuhay ang Musikang Pilipino" (transl. Long Live Philippine Music). During the show, Eurovision Song Contest 2025 winner JJ appeared in a video message. The Eurovision Song Contest YouTube stream experienced technical difficulties during the first half of the performing acts, with the stream freezing at intervals.

Philippine Selection Night final
R/O	Artist	Song	Place			
R/O	Artist	Song	Place	1	DNA	"Between Bituin"
2	AJAA	"Make It Exist"				
3	Jason Dy and Sassa Dagdag	"Di Yan (Red Flag)"				
4	JM Dela Cerna and Marielle Montellano	"Mapadama"	3			
5	Vvink feat. Wrive Russu	"Round n' Round"				
6	Saga	"Broken Beyond Repair"	2			
7	Ryssi Avila	"Good for You"				
8	Elha Nympha, Esang de Torres, Lance Reblando and Nar Cabico	"Cheri(e)"				
9	Carmelle	"Sobra-Sobra"	1			
10	Khimo	"Reason to Live"				

== At Eurovision Asia ==
Carmelle at the Eurovision Song Contest Asia

"Sobra-Sobra" won the contest having scored 211 points; 118 points from the public vote and 93 points from the juries.

=== Performance ===
Carmelle wore a blue and red flame esque dress and was joined on stage by a number of dancers. Her performance featured pyrotechnics.

=== Voting ===
==== Points awarded to the Philippines ====
Points awarded to the Philippines
Score	Televote	Jury
12 points		Bangladesh; Bhutan; Cambodia; Laos; South Korea
10 points		Mongolia; Nepal
8 points		
7 points		
6 points		Thailand
5 points		
4 points		Vietnam
3 points		Malaysia
2 points		
1 point		

==== Points awarded by the Philippines ====
Points awarded by the Philippines
Points	Televote	Jury
12 points		Malaysia
10 points		South Korea
8 points		Thailand
7 points		Vietnam
6 points		Laos
5 points		Nepal
4 points		Bhutan
3 points		Mongolia
2 points		Bangladesh
1 point		Cambodia

== Participation overview ==
Table key
1	First place
†	Upcoming event

Participation history
Year	Artist	Song	Language	Final	Points
2026	Carmelle	"Sobra-Sobra"	English, Filipino	1	211
