= Jaruwat Cheawaram =

Thai singer

- จารุวัฒน์ เชี่ยวอร่าม
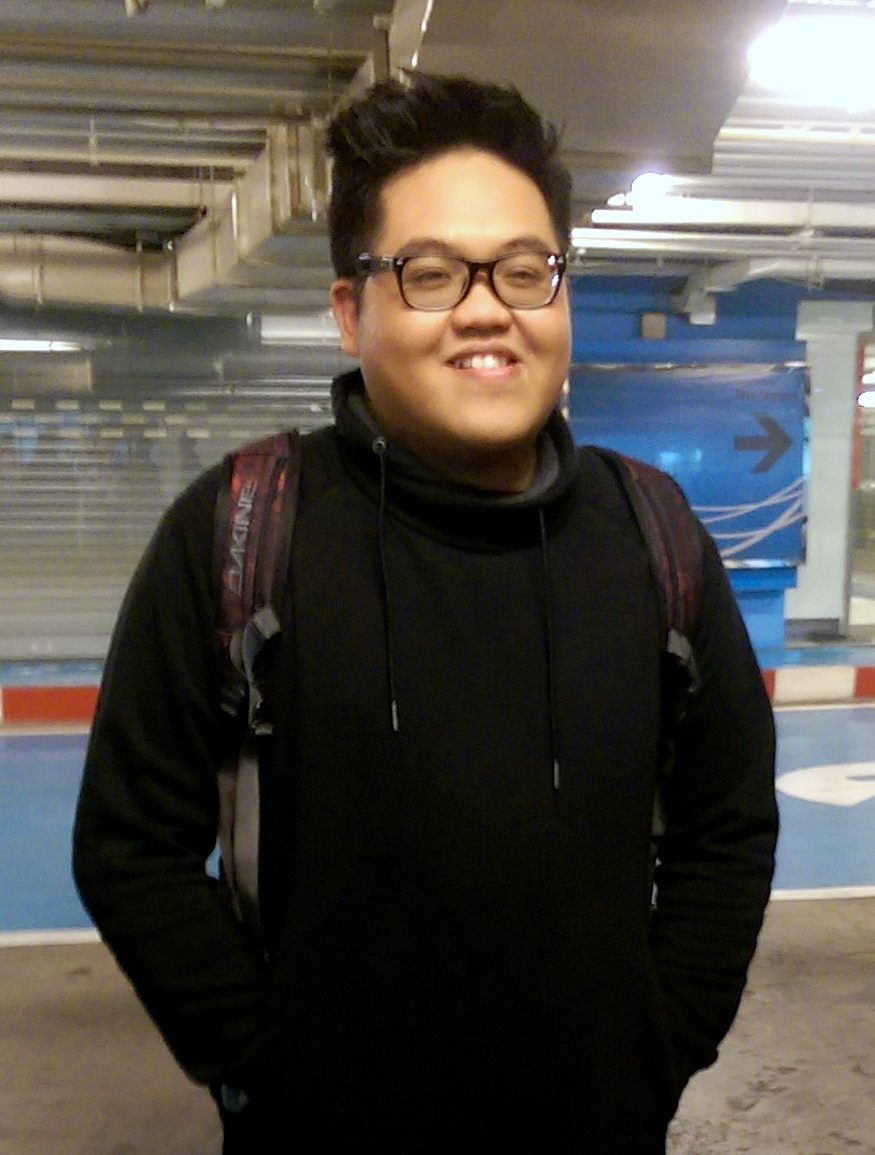
- Born: จารุวัฒน์ เชี่ยวอร่าม; 29 September 1991 (age 34); Phuket, Thailand
- Other name: Dome
- Education: Thammasat University
- Occupations: Singer; actor
- Years active: 2012–present
- Musical career
- Genres: R&B; pop music; folk music
- Label: GMM Grammy

Jaruwat Cheawaram (Thai: จารุวัฒน์ เชี่ยวอร่าม; RTGS: Charuwat Chiao-a-ram; born 29 September 1991), nicknamed Dome (Thai: โดม), is a Thai singer. The champion of The Star Season 8 singing contest. He is known for his songs "Kham Athitthan Duai Nam Ta" (คำอธิษฐานด้วยน้ำตา) and "Rak Tae Yu Nuea Kanwela" (รักแท้อยู่เหนือกาลเวลา) and his leading role as Tun (ตุ่น) in the sitcom Yin Den (ยีนเด่น) (2014).

== Early life and education ==
Jaruwat was born on 29 September 1991 in Phuket, Thailand. He had a passion for singing since he was a child. His family was poor with his father suffering from paralysis due to cerebral hemorrhage from an accident.

He graduated from the Faculty of Law, Thammasat University in 2017.

== Career ==
When he was 16, Jaruwat joined The Star Season 4 and 5 but was eliminated. He was then inspired by the winner, eighteen-year-old Gam Wichayanee Pearklin. He was back again in The Star Season 8 and made it to the final round, held at Impact Arena in Muang Thong Thani on 29 April, with fellow contestant Tanatat Chaiyaat. Dome was crowned champion of The Star Season 8, receiving the most votes from viewers across the country. Dome signed a contract with GMM Grammy and continued to build his career in the entertainment industry.

== Discography ==
=== Studio albums ===
Title	Details
Dome Dream	Released: 11 October 2012; Label: GMM Music; Formats: CD, digital download, streaming; Tracklist: 1. "Kho Anuyat.. Huangyai" (ขออนุญาต..ห่วงใย); 2. "Trap Fa Din Salai" (ตราบฟ้าดินสลาย); 3. "Aep Rak Ik Laeo" (แอบรักอีกแล้ว); 4. "Klua Khwam Hang Klai" (กลัวความห่างไกล) [feat. Gam Wichayanee]; 5. "Lok Thang Bai" (โลกทั้งใบ); 6. "Khon Doen Din" (คนเดินดิน); 7. "Kho Khwam Huang Prathang Khwam Ngao" (ขอความหวังประทังความเหงา); 8. "Loi" (ลอย); 9. "Kham Athitthan Duai Namta" (คำอธิษฐานด้วยน้ำตา); 10. "Khon Nai Sot" (คนไหนโสด)

== Filmography ==
=== Television series ===
Year	Title	Role	Network	Notes	Ref.
2014	Yin Den ยีนเด่น	Tun	One 31	Main role	
2020	Khadi Rak Wela Phop	Jo	GMM25	Guest role	
2021	Kaew Luem Khon	Sakchai	One 31	Supporting role	
2021	Phupha Phi Khum	Thaen	One 31	Supporting role	
2022	Flash Marriage	Korn	One 31	Supporting role	
2022	War of Y: War of Managers	Lookpla	AIS Play	Supporting role	
2023	You Are My Universe	Kungten	Channel 3 HD	Supporting role	
2023	Tales of the Grandmaster	Phat (Doctor)	One 31	Supporting role	
2023	Across the Sky	Pangpond	One 31	Supporting role	
2023	Cooking Crush	Samsee	GMM25	Supporting role	

=== Film ===
Year	Title	Role	Notes	Ref.
2015	Lava	Uku	Voice role, Thai version	
2021	Oh My Ghost! The Fierce Escape from COVID-19	Wan	Main role	
2024	Achilles Curse and the Curse of Treasure	Phat	Supporting role	
