= Amy Mastura discography =

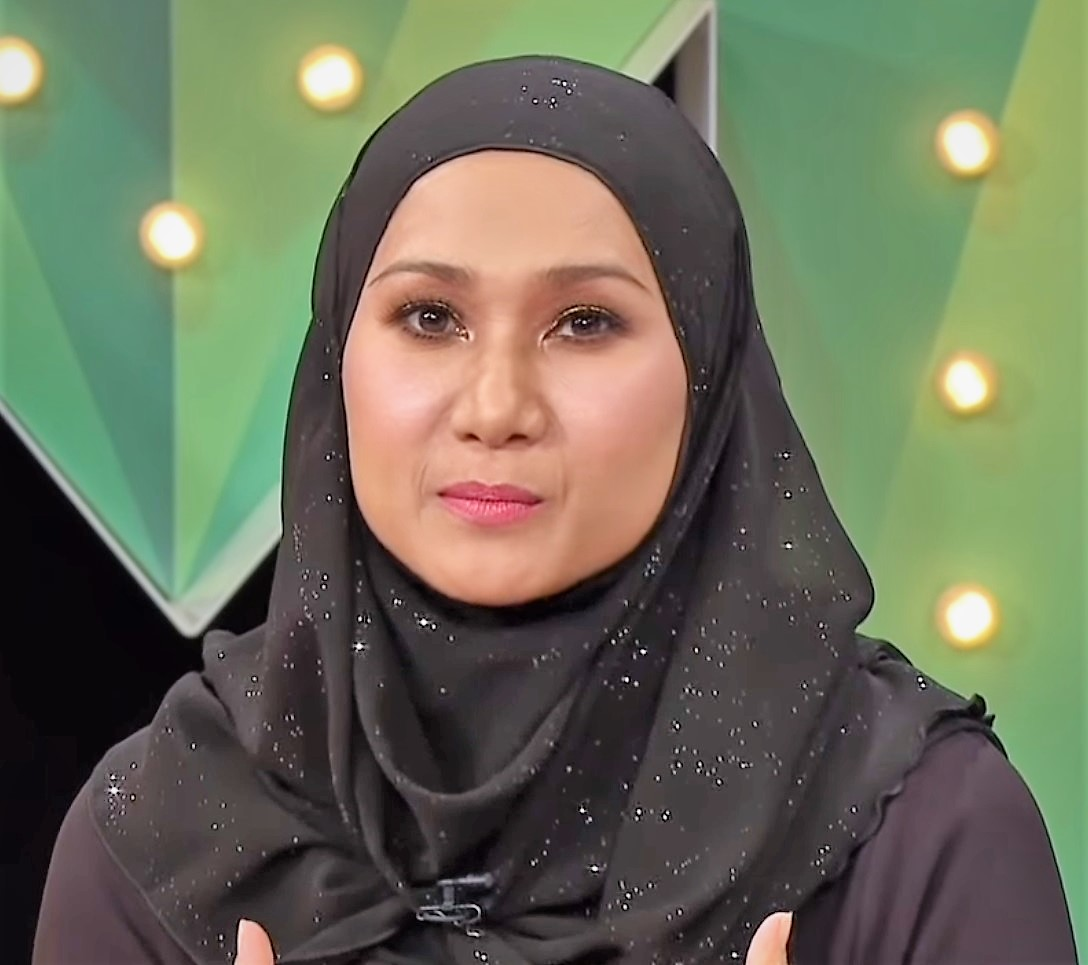
- Amy Mastura in 2015
- Studio albums: 7
- Soundtrack albums: 2
- Compilation albums: 4
- Remix albums: 1
- Singles: 30
- Video albums: 5

Amy Mastura is a Malaysian singer and songwriter. She has released seven studio albums, with her first two have been certified platinum, and few singles and music videos. This is a list of her album and single releases.

== Albums ==
=== Studio albums ===
Title	Album details	Certifications	Sales
Amy Mastura	Released: 4 September 1994; Label: Pony Canyon; Formats: CD, cassette	2x Platinum (Malaysia); Gold (Japan)	100,000 (Malaysia); 100,000 (Japan)
Pujaanku	Released: 14 May 1996; Label: Pony Canyon; Formats: CD, cassette	Platinum	150,000
Puteri	Released: 1 November 1997; Label: Pony Canyon; Formats: CD, cassette	–	–
Bintang Hati	Released: 31 January 2000; Label: Sony Music Malaysia; Formats: CD, cassette	–	–
Akan Datang	Released: 24 June 2002; Label: Sony Music Malaysia; Formats: CD, cassette	–	–
Lebih Baik	Released: December 2005; Label: Sony BMG Music Entertainment Malaysia; Formats: CD, cassette	–	–
Happy	Released: 5 May 2009; Label: Sony Music Malaysia; Formats: CD, cassette	–	–
" – " denotes no certification or sales information available.

=== Soundtrack albums ===
Title	Album details
Impian: Original Soundtrack	Released: 1996; Label: Pony Canyon; Formats: CD, cassette
Lagu-lagu Tema Puteri Impian 2	Released: 1998; Label: Sony Music; Formats: CD, cassette

=== Compilation albums ===
Title	Album details
The Best of Amy Mastura	Released: 1998; Label: Pony Canyon; Formats: CD, cassette
Keunggulan Amy Mastura	Released: 2007; Label: Sony BMG; Formats: CD, cassette
The Essential: Amy Mastura	Released: 2010; Label: Sony Music; Formats: CD
The Best of Amy Mastura	Released: 2012; Label: Sony Music; Formats: CD

=== Remix albums ===
Title	Album details
Versi Remix	Released: December 1999; Label: Pony Canyon; Formats: CD, cassette

== Singles ==
=== As lead artist ===
Title	Year	Album
"Kasih"	1994	Amy Mastura
"Jawapan Kasih"	1994	Amy Mastura
"Meniti Hari"	1994	Amy Mastura
"Warkah Biru"	1995	Amy Mastura
"Suria Khatulistiwa"	1995	Amy Mastura
"Flora & Fauna"	1995	Amy Mastura

=== As featured artist ===
Title	Year	Album
"Harapan Semalam" (Azmeer feat. Amy Mastura)	1993	Azmeer
"The Best Part" (Tommy Page feat. Amy Mastura)	1996	Time

== Music videos ==
List of music videos, with director (when available) and year
Title	Year	Album	Director
"Kasih"	1994	Amy Mastura	—
"Jawapan Kasih"	1994	Amy Mastura	—
"Meniti Hari"	1994	Amy Mastura	Paul Wong
"Suria Khatulistiwa"	1994	Amy Mastura	—
"Kasih Kita"	1996	Pujaanku	Azri Izhar / Ramli Salleh
"Kembalilah"	1996	Pujaanku	Azri Izhar / Ramli Salleh
"Pintu Harapan"	1997	Pujaanku	Azri Izhar / Ramli Salleh
"Puteri"	1997	Puteri	Amri Ginang
"Gema Rembulan"	1997	Puteri	—
"Kedua"	1999	OST Puteri Impian 2	Aziz M. Osman
"Cahaya"	1999	OST Puteri Impian 2	Din Glamour
"Dengarkanlah" (with Glenn Fredly)	1999	Bintang Hati	Rizal Mantovani
"Bintang Hati"	2000	Bintang Hati	Rizal Mantovani
"Sha Na Na"	2000	Bintang Hati	Richard Buntario
"Siapalah Aku"	2000	Bintang Hati	—
"Akan Datang"	2002	Akan Datang	Richard Buntario
"Kasih Suci"	2002	Akan Datang	Paul Loosey
"Hati Berlagu"	2002	Akan Datang	—
"Bingung"	2005	Lebih Baik	—
"Cinta"	2006	Lebih Baik	Rashidi Ishak
"Kasihku Sinar"	2006	Lebih Baik	—
"Lagu Happy"	2009	Happy	—
"Kalimah"	2016	Kalimah - Single	—
"—" denotes no director information available.
