= Versi Remix =

Remix album by Amy Mastura
- Released: December 1999
- Recorded: 1999
- Studios: HiTS Recording Studios, Penang
- Genres: Electronic, Dance-pop
- Length: 52:51
- Label: Pony Canyon
- Producer: Goh Boon Hoe

Amy Mastura chronology
The Best of Amy Mastura (1998)	Versi Remix (1999)	Bintang Hati (2000)

Singles from Versi Remix
- 1. "Cinta Kita" Released: 15 August 1999

Versi Remix is a remix album by Malaysian singer, Amy Mastura, released in December 1999 by Pony Canyon. The album includes remixed versions of her earlier songs as well as new material.

== Background and recording ==
Versi Remix was Amy Mastura's first remix album and the only such album she made since she started her music career after winning the Asia Bagus talent show in 1993. The album contains nine remixed versions of her earlier songs: three songs from her self-titled album, the other three from Pujaanku and Puteri respectively.

Versi Remix also contains only one new song entitled "Cinta Kita" composed and wrote by Ajai. All of the album's nine tracks were remixed and remastered by P.C. Foley and Wayne Lim at HiTS Recording Studios in Penang.

== Track listing ==
No.	Title	Writer(s)	Length
1.	"Diam-Diam Rindu" (Asmara Mix)	Goh Boon Hoe, Seri Bayu	4:58
2.	"Jawapan Kasih" (Penggoda Mix)	Azira Azid, Halim	4:55
3.	"Kasih Kita" (Percussion Mix)	Dorie Kalmas, Arie Satyawan	4:38
4.	"Puteri" (Cool Mix)	Amy Mastura	2:28
5.	"Pintu Harapan" (Dance Mix)	Azlan Abu Hassan, Amran Omar	4:02
6.	"Meniti Hari" (Mean Street Mix)	Fauzi Marzuki, Amran Omar	5:45
7.	"Hanya Dalam Lagu" (D'Club Mix)	Azmeer	3:17
8.	"Izinkanlah" (Cinta Sayang Mix)	Nassier, Ajai	4:16
9.	"Flora dan Fauna" (Industrial Mix)	Mazlan Hamzah, Marliza, Azmil Mustapha	4:04
10.	"Cinta Kita"	Ajai	3:43
Total length:			52:51

== Release ==
The album was released in December 1999 to popular success. "Cinta Kita" was the album's only single and was released four months earlier, on 15 August 1999.
