= Bintang Hati =

Studio album by Amy Mastura
- Released: 31 January 2000
- Recorded: May – December 1999
- Studios: Bumble Bee Studios; KRU Studios
- Genres: Pop, R&B
- Length: 40:15
- Label: Sony Music Malaysia
- Producer: Goh Boon Hoe

Amy Mastura chronology
Versi Remix (1999)	Bintang Hati (2000)	Akan Datang (2002)

Singles from Bintang Hati
- 1. "Sha Na Na" Released: 14 February 2000; 2. "Bintang Hati" Released: 3 April 2000; 3. "Siapalah Aku" Released: 6 August 2000; 4. "Di Sudut Hati" Released: 18 October 2000

Bintang Hati is the fourth studio album by Malaysian singer, Amy Mastura, released on 31 January 2000 by Sony Music Malaysia. It is her first studio album with Sony Music after having previously been signed to Pony Canyon. Four singles were released from the album.

== Production ==
After released her five albums (Note: Three studio albums (Amy Mastura, Pujaanku and Puteri), a compilation album (The Best of Amy Mastura) and a remix album (Versi Remix).) albums with Pony Canyon, Amy Mastura decided to not renew her contract with her former record label upon the expiration of her recording contract in December 1997. She then signed a contract with Sony Music in 1998 and began working on what was to become Bintang Hati in 1999.

Prior to the album's release, Amy released the single "Dengarkanlah" featuring the late Indonesian singer Glenn Fredly. Released in October 1999 in Indonesia and in November 1999 in her native Malaysia, the song were initially intended to be part of the album, but did not make the final cut. Recording of Bintang Hati was done in seven months at two different recording studios, namely Bumble Bee Studios and KRU Studios, while the mixing process was done at the Synchrosound Studios. The album was mixed by Greg Henderson and mastered by Faisal Ghazali.

Songwriting was primarily handled by Goh Boon Hoe (also known as Boon Tan), who composed four songs including the title track, while Amran Omar and Salina Hadi wrote lyrics for majority of the songs. Malaysian boy band, KRU composed and wrote "Tekanan Jiwa". Backing vocals were provided by singers by Lynn Ali, Sharizan Borhan and Shawn Baharin as well as Amy Mastura herself. In the album, there's a song called "Sha Na Na", where she received her second songwriting credit after "Puteri", taken from her 1997 album of the same name.

== Release and reception ==
Bintang Hati was released on 31 January 2000 to popular success. The first single to be released for the album was "Sha Na Na". Other songs like "Bintang Hati" and "Siapalah Aku" were released as later singles. The album earned Amy a Pop Rock category at the 15th edition of Anugerah Juara Lagu for the title track.

A reviewer from Berita Harian described the album as "an effort to strengthening Amy Mastura's position within music industry".

== Track listing ==
No.	Title	Writer(s)	Length
1.	"Bintang Hati"	Boon Tan, Amran Omar	3:40
2.	"Senyumanmu"	Boon Tan, Sarina Hadi	3:50
3.	"Siapalah Aku"	Zul Mahat, Amran Omar	4:25
4.	"Hanya Kau"	Mazlan Hamzah, Sarina Hadi	4:15
5.	"Hadiah"	Boon Tan, Amran Omar	4:50
6.	"Sha Na Na"	Amy Mastura	3:33
7.	"Puji"	Helen Yap, Aznil Nawawi	4:20
8.	"Tekanan Jiwa"	KRU	3:40
9.	"Kau, Ku dan Dia"	Boon Tan, Salina Hadi	4:20
10.	"Di Sudut Hati"	Ajai, Amran Omar	5:00
Total length:			40:15
