= Hadir =

Hadir may refer to:

== Given name ==
- Hadir Lazame (born 1975), Iraqi judoka
- Hadir Mekhimar (born 1997), Egyptian sport shooter

== Places ==
- Hadir, Yemen, a populated place in the Sanaa Governorate, Yemen

== Other ==
- Hadir (album), 1996 debut studio album by Malaysian singer, Sharizan Borhan
- Hadir Karim, a character in two Call of Duty games
  - Call of Duty: Modern Warfare (2019 video game)
  - Call of Duty: Modern Warfare II (2022 video game)

== See also ==
- Bayt Hadir, a populated place in the Sanaa Governorate, Yemen
