= Mazuin Hamzah =

Malaysian singer and former spouse to Prince Sufri Bolkiah of Brunei

Mazuin Hamzah ماذوين حمزه
- Born: 11 December 1964 (age 61); Ipoh, Perak, Malaysia
- Spouse: Prince Sufri Bolkiah (m. 1987; div. 2003)
- Issue: Prince Abdul Khaaliq; Pengiran Anak Ajeerah Firdausul Bulqiah; Pengiran Anak Raafiah Amalul Bulqiah
Names
- Hajah Mazuin binti Hamzah
- Father: Hamzah Ramli
- Mother: Maimon
- Religion: Sunni Islam
- Occupation: Singer, musician and actress
- Musical career
- Genres: Disco; pop
- Instruments: Vocals; drum; guitar; piano; organ
- Years active: 1970s–1980s
- Labels: Life Records; Iramanada Musical Industries; Polygram Records
- Formerly of: Quinary M

Dato' Laila Utama Hajah Mazuin binti Hamzah (born 11 December 1964) is the Malaysian-born singer, musician and actress. Additionally, she is previously a member of the royal family of Brunei as the third wife of Prince Sufri Bolkiah, brother of Sultan Hassanal Bolkiah. Along with her younger brothers, she was formerly a part of the musical group, Quinary M. Amy Mastura is a cousin with whom she is related.

== Musical career ==
Quinary M's career and musical growth then took a significant turn in 1974 when Mazlan teamed up with her sister Mazuin for a television program produced by Radio Televisyen Malaysia (RTM). But a year later, the family joined her father, Hamzah Ramli, who was then a diplomat, and relocated to Moscow, Russia. When they arrived in Moscow, everything started to change, and their artistic adventure also got underway. She acquired fluency in Russian as a result of the move.

They were given the chance to hold an offering for their father's firm at the Moscow television station at that time. They also host offerings to well-known organisations that serve as Russian ambassadors. Since all of his children's names begin with the letter M, he decided to launch 'The M' the instant he saw his kids' musical potential.

They returned to Malaysia three years later, and they have since seized the chance to further hone their creative abilities. Mazlan secured the fourth position in the Bakat '78 competition, which was released by RTM. Afterwards, Quinary M was added to the group's name. Quinary M derives its name from a musical language with five meanings. Moreover, it is the first group of its kind in Malaysia, with all of its members being brothers and sisters.

After returning from Moscow, their father joined the Malaysian Royal Police as well. They entered and advanced to the final round of the 1978 Talent competition, thanks to their father's support. They only received the consolation prize, which does not make them any luckier. But when their father left in 1981, the group was forced to break up.

== Personal life ==
=== Marriage ===
On 10 July 1987, Mazuin's love affair with Prince Sufri Bolkiah commenced. They had the chance to meet for the first time in the prince's home on Jalan Ampang in Kuala Lumpur, at Vila Cinta Bersemi. The group of Malaysian artists that joined Mekar Sejambak was asked to have sleep with the prince, but it was not an official meeting by Mazuin. Instead, the group was picked up to celebrate the prince's birthday at the end of July 1987 in Bandar Seri Begawan.

Sufri made the risk of seeing Mazuin and her mother Maimon before she and the other artists left for Malaysia. In the Istana Darul Hana's formal chamber, the prince expressed his want to marry Mazuin. Before answering him, The prince initially enquired as to whether he had a choice, according to a report published in URTV magazine. Astonished by Sufri's query, Mazuin shook her head. Sufri also inquired of Maimon, who had been faithful to go with her daughter, if she would be open to receiving him as her son-in-law. At the age of 23, Maimon feels it is best if Mazuin makes the decision about her future, thus she would rather leave it to her daughter.

A week following their encounter in Bandar Seri Begawan, the prince flew on his private jet to Kuala Lumpur to pop the question to Mazuin after an arrangement was struck. She ultimately wed Sufri on 11 December 1987, when she was 23 years old. She also made history by being the first female artist to be named a wife to a royalty in one of the wealthiest nations on earth. Throughout her marriage, she holds the title of Pengiran Bini, and styled as Yang Amat Mulia. It has been challenging for journalists to track down Mazuin to get her response regarding their divorce in 2003. The Brunei High Commission's spokespeople also wish to keep their divorce matters secret and avoid disclosing them to the public or media.

=== Issue ===
Together they have three children:

- Pengiran Muda (Prince) Abdul Khaaliq
- Pengiran Anak Ajeerah Firdausul Bolkiah
- Pengiran Anak Raafi'ah Amalul Bulqiah

== Later life ==
It has been discovered that in late 2023, Chef Zam visited her at her home in Bandar Seri Begawan. She can be heard singing his hit song "Cinta Palsu" in the uploaded video, the song that helped make the Quinary M group famous. Salwa Abdul Rahman is one of the individuals who has been acquainted with fellow artist Mazuin. Although she has a home on Jalan Pengiran Babu Raja, which was close to Darul Karamah, she still choose to live in her first Bruneian residence. She squandered too much good will on the Bruneian royal family. Her good connection with the Bruneian royal family was said to be intact.

== Discography ==
Year	Name	Album	Notes
1973	"Ratapan Anak Tiri"	Single non-album	Duet with Mazlan Hamzah
1975	"Jangan Lah Jangan"	Single non-album	Duet with Mazlan Hamzah
1979	"Cinta Palsu"	Quinary M	
1980	"Kasihku Bagaikan Debu"	Quinary M	
1981	"Kini Kau Berubah"	Quinary M	
1983	"Mazuin"	Single non-album	
1984	"Awas! Duri Cinta"	Single non-album	
1986	"Terbanglah Kau Burung"	Single non-album	
1987	"Pertemuan Ini Seindah Mimpi"	Single non-album	

== Filmography ==
Year	Title	Roles	Notes
1979	Kisah Seorang Biduan	As a member of the Quintary M group	This film is one of her first plays and shows her other brothers and sisters as a collection of Quinary M. She sings the song Mengapa which is also on their first album, Cinta Palsu (1979).
1979	Ceritaku Ceritamu	Suriati	She was given the character of being a child to Zainurdin Ismail dan Saadiah.

== Honours ==
She was given the following honours:

- Family Order of Laila Utama (DK; 15 July 1990) – Dato Laila Utama
- Dame Grand Cross of the Order of the White Elephant (PCh (KCE))
