= Istana Banderung Kayangan =

Palace in Brunei

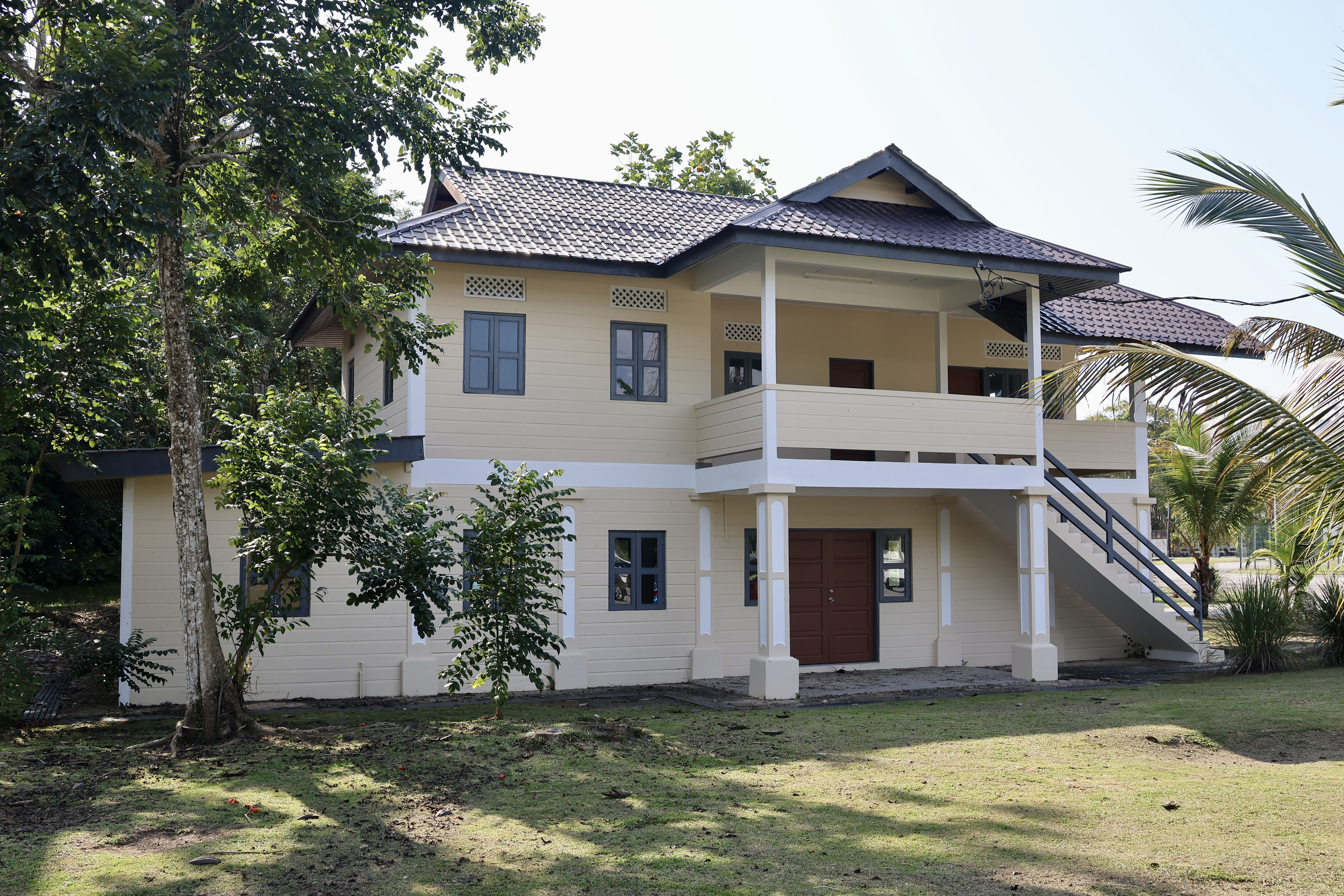
- Istana Banderung Kayangan in 2023
- Alternative names: Istana Tumasek

General information
- Type: Residence
- Architectural style: Traditional Malay
- Location: Jalan Istana Darul Hana, Tumasek, Bandar Seri Begawan, Brunei-Muara, Brunei
- Coordinates: 4.8768699°N 114.9250700°E
- Completed: 1930s
- Renovated: 1970s

Technical details
- Material: Concrete and wood

The Istana Banderung Kayangan (English: Banderung Kayangan Palace) is a 20th-century royal palace that served as the former residence of Omar Ali Saifuddien III, the 28th Sultan of Brunei. The palace is situated in Kampong Tumasek, next to Istana Darul Hana surau and the rear entrance to Istana Nurul Iman. Another name for the palace is Istana Tumasek.

== Design and construction ==
The pillars are composed of concrete (cement), whereas the entire structure is constructed out of wood. This palace has a "atap putong limas roof," also called a "beranda." Little yellow-painted pillars, standing 0.6 metres (2 ft 0 in) tall, support the roof, which is meant to be used as a living area or rest place. This palace was once covered in bullion roof tiles. The palace underwent restoration in the 1970s, when an iron roof was installed in its place and geometric designs were used to shade the pillars. There is a beranda that is attached to the stairway.

== History ==
Prince Omar Ali Saifuddien stayed in his house Istana Banderung Kayangan, while Sultan Ahmad Tajuddin went to Istana Mahkota, which is the location of the current Istana Darul Hana. The marriage ceremony on 6 September 1941, between Prince Omar Ali Saifuddien and Pengiran Anak Damit, was one of the most significant events to ever take place in this palace. Pengiran Shahbandar Pengiran Anak Hashim led the traditional ceremony of sending a marriage symbol as part of the Gendang Jaga-Jaga ceremony.

== See also ==
- Politics of Brunei
- Bandar Seri Begawan
- Istana Nurul Iman
