= Prince Sufri Bolkiah =

Bruneian prince (born 1952)

Sufri Bolkiah صوفري بولكيه
- Pengiran Bendahara Seri Maharaja Permaisuara
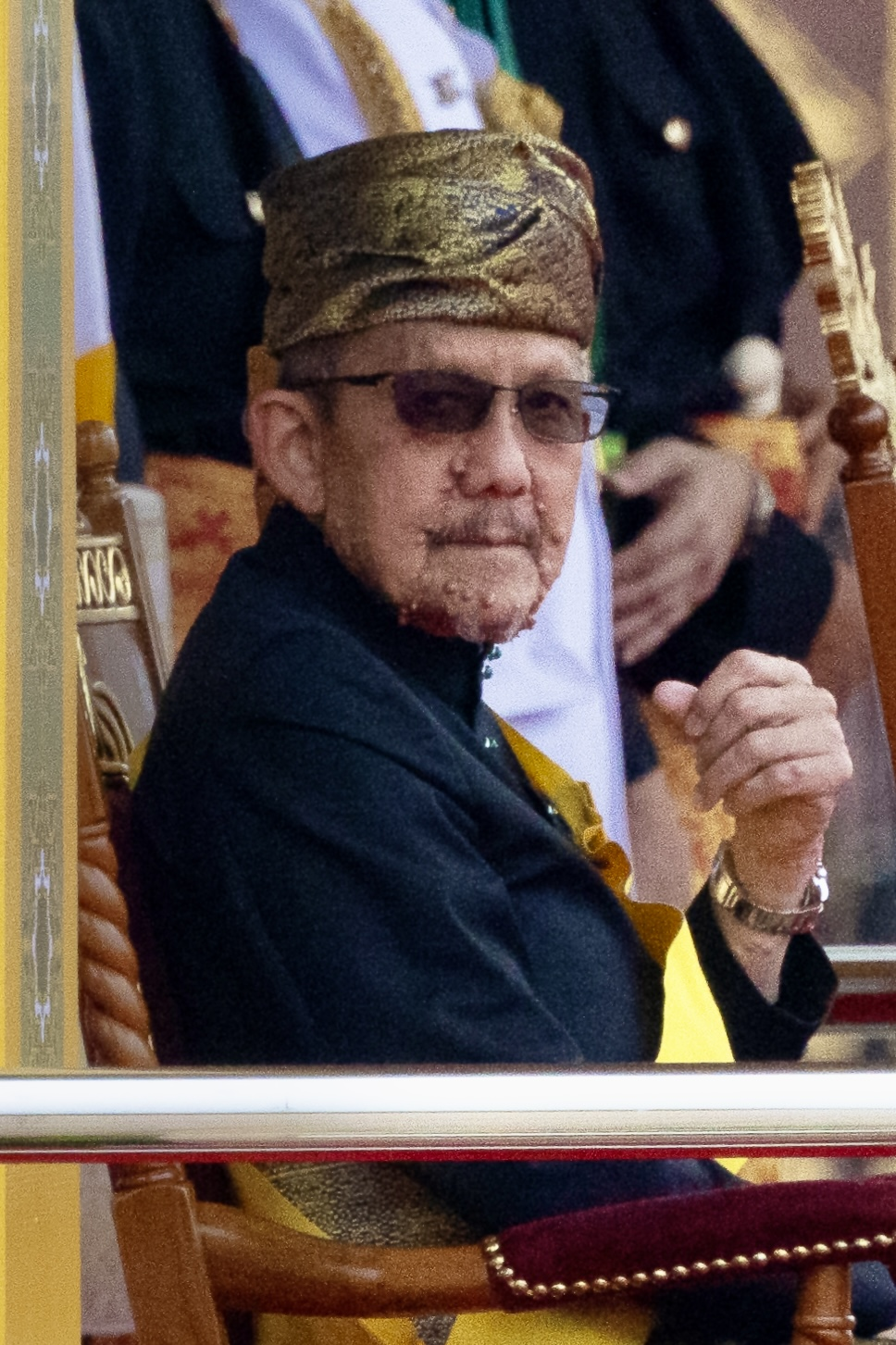
- Prince Sufri in 2024

President of the Brunei Darussalam National Olympic Council
- Incumbent
- Assumed office 1984

President of the Football Association of Brunei Darussalam
- In office 2013–2019
- Preceded by: Abdul Rahman Mohiddin
- Succeeded by: Pengiran Matusin
- Born: Sufri Bolkiah ibni Omar 'Ali Saifuddien Sa'adul Khairi Waddien; 31 July 1952 (age 74); Istana Darul Hana, Brunei Town, Brunei
- Spouse: Pengiran Anak Salma (m. 1971; div. 1981) Siti Ruhaizah (m. 1982; div. 1986) Mazuin Hamzah (m. 1987; div. 2003) Faizah Nasir (m. 1999)
- Issue: 10
- House: Bolkiah
- Father: Sultan Omar Ali Saifuddien III
- Mother: Pengiran Anak Damit
- Religion: Islam
- Education: Sultan Omar Ali Saifuddien College; Victoria Institution

Sufri Bolkiah ibni Omar Ali Saifuddien III (born 31 July 1952) is a member of the royal family of Brunei. He is the third son of Omar Ali Saifuddien III, the 28th Sultan of Brunei, and Raja Isteri (Queen) Pengiran Anak Damit. He has also been the President of the Brunei Darussalam National Olympic Council (BDNOC) since 2010.

== Early life and education ==
Prince Sufri Bolkiah was born on 31 July 1952 at Istana Darul Hana, Kampong Tumasek, Brunei Town. He is the third son of Sultan Omar Ali Saifuddien Sa'adul Khairi Waddien, the 28th Sultan of Brunei, and his wife, Raja Isteri Pengiran Anak Damit. Sultan Hassanal Bolkiah, Prince Mohamed Bolkiah, and Prince Jefri Bolkiah are his three brothers, while Princess Masna, Princess Nor'ain, Princess Umi Kalthum Al-Islam, Princess Amal Rakiah, Princess Amal Nasibah, and Princess Amal Jefriah are his six sisters.

In 1967, at the age of 13, Sufri Bolkiah underwent a circumcision ceremony alongside his brother, Jefri Bolkiah. He received his early education at the Lapau and later at Sultan Omar Ali Saifuddien College, along with his siblings. He furthered his studies at Victoria Institution in Kuala Lumpur.

== Career ==
Since the establishment of the BDNOC in 1984, Sufri Bolkiah has served as its president, delivering his inaugural general meeting address on 14 January 1987. He has been re-elected multiple times since, with his most recent re-election taking place on 21 July 2010.

Known to be close to Prince Jefri, he served as acting sultan in 1987 when all of his brothers and their families made the pilgrimage to Mecca for the Hajj. He presently has no position in Brunei's cabinet due to health concerns. He was appointed head of Primal Corporation in August 1993 and was given permission by Hanoi authorities to invest up to US$9 million over 20 years in oil and gas development in Vietnam.

During the 1990 Commonwealth Games in Auckland, he participated in the Men's Shooting Clay Pigeon Trap and obtained 127 points, which put him in last place. It was noted that he was unhappy with his shotgun during the competition.

Representing the BDNOC on 12 February 2013, he, together with his son Pengiran Muda Abdul Aleem, played in a "Charity for Nancy" futsal competition. The National Football Association of Brunei Darussalam (NFABD) and the Department of Youth and Sports collaborated to organize the four-day competition, which was completed yesterday. Tea Ai Seng, also known as Nancy, received B$2,400 from it to help with the cost of her treatment.

== Marriages and issue ==
=== First marriage ===
On 14 July 1971, Prince Sufri married Pengiran Anak Salma binti Pengiran Anak Muhammad Salleh, who was given the title of Pengiran Anak Isteri. They divorced in 1981.

- Pengiran Anak Kamilah Bulqiah (born 18 April 1972); married Pengiran Hashim bin Pengiran Muhammad in October 2002
- Pengiran Muda Muhammad Safiz (born 13 February 1974)
- Pengiran Anak Muhdiyatul Bulqiah (born 18 December 1977)

=== Second marriage ===
On 20 February 1982, Sufri married Siti Ruhaizah binti Ibrahim. They divorced in 1986.

- Pengiran Anak Hamlatul Arsy Mulia (born 4 December 1982); married Nick Iskandar bin Mohammad Idris on 8 January 2022

=== Third marriage ===
On 11 February 1987, Sufri married Mazuin binti Hamzah. They divorced in 2003. She held the title Pengiran Bini during their marriage.

- Pengiran Anak Ajeerah Firdausul Bulqiah (born 7 September 1988)
- Pengiran Anak Raafiah Amalul Bulqiah (born 23 April 1992)
- Pengiran Muda Abdul Khaaliq (born 2 January 1994)

=== Fourth marriage ===
In 1999, Sufri married Faizah binti Dato Nasir, who was given the title of Pengiran Bini.

- Pengiran Muda Abdul Aleem
- Pengiran Anak Aliiyah Amalul Bulqiah
- Pengiran Anak Aizzatul Bulqiah

He resides at Istana Darul Hana with his family.

== Titles, styles and honours ==
Styles of Prince Sufri
- Reference style: Yang Teramat Mulia
- Alternative style: His Royal Highness

=== Title and style ===
- 31 July 1952 – 8 November 1979: Yang Teramat Mulia Pengiran Muda Sufri Bolkiah ibni Sultan Omar 'Ali Saifuddien Sa'adul Khairi Waddien
- 8 November 1979 – present: Duli Yang Teramat Mulia Paduka Seri Pengiran Bendahara Seri Maharaja Permaisuara Pengiran Muda Sufri Bolkiah ibni Sultan Omar 'Ali Saifuddien Sa'adul Khairi Waddien

=== Honours ===
Personal standard of Pengiran Bendahara Seri Maharaja Permaisuara

==== National ====
- Royal Family Order of the Crown of Brunei (DKMB)
- Order of Laila Utama (DK; 1970) – Dato Laila Utama
- Order of Seri Utama (DK; 1968) – Dato Seri Utama
- Sultan Hassanal Bolkiah Medal (PHBS; 1 August 19680
- Pingat Bakti Laila Ikhlas (PBLI)
- Meritorious Service Medal (PJK)

==== Foreign ====
- Malaysia:
  - Order of the Crown of Johor Knight Grand Commander (SPMJ) – Dato'
  - Order of the Crown of Kelantan Knight Grand Commander (SPMK) – Dato'
- United Kingdom: Honorary Commander of the Royal Victorian Order (CVO)
- Thailand: Order of the White Elephant Knight Grand Cordon (MPCh (GCE))

=== Things named after him ===
- Sufri Bolkiah Secondary School, a secondary school in Tutong town, Tutong District
- Sufri Bolkiah Mosque, a mosque in Kampong Perpindanah Burong Pingai, Berakas 'A', Brunei-Muara District

Prince Sufri Bolkiah House of Bolkiah Born: 31 July 1952
Preceded by Abdul Muqtadir	Succession to the Bruneian throne 14th position	Succeeded by Muhammad Safiz
Regnal titles
Preceded by Pengiran Muda Hashim	Pengiran Bendahara Seri Maharaja Permaisuara; 1979–present	Incumbent
Sporting positions
Preceded by Abdul Rahman Mohiddin	President of the Football Association of Brunei Darussalam; 2013–2019	Succeeded by Pengiran Matusin
