= Cico Harahap =

Malaysian actor (1978–2026)

- Born: Ezzaq Farrouq Harahap Jamaludin; 7 July 1978; Kuala Lumpur, Malaysia
- Died: 8 November 2026 (aged 48); Ampang, Malaysia
- Occupations: Actor, singer
- Years active: 1993–2016
- Spouse: Nur Fuziani (m. 2008; div. 2010)
- Children: 1
- Parents: Jamaluddin Jalil Harahap (father); Uji Rashid (mother)

Ezzaq Farrouq "Cico" Harahap Jamaludin (7 July 1978 – 8 November 2026) was a Malaysian actor and singer. He was famous for his roles in Puteri Impian the series (1997-1998), Anak Mami (2002) and Operation Mekong (2016).

== Career ==
Cico started his career as a child actor, playing Yusman in the 1993 film Kekasih Awal dan Akhir. Cico gained wide recognition after his role as Zulkifli in the series Puteri Impian (1997-1998). He later acted as Saiful in the movie Anak Mami and its 2005 sequel, Anak Mami Kembali, gaining much popularity in Sumatra.

After the Operation Mekong (2016) premiere, his health deteriorated. Uji Rashid, his mother said that he could barely speak or walk anymore after suffering from severe septic shock. Cico announced his retirement in acting in 2017, after there was very little improvement in his condition.

== Personal life and death ==
Cico was of Batak and Malay ancestry. On 25 February 2008, he married a Thai woman, Nur Fuziani binti Abdullah. They had a daughter together. The couple divorced in 2010.

Cico died on 8 November 2026, at the age of 48.

== Filmography ==
=== Film ===
Year	Title	Role	Note
1993	Kekasih Awal Dan Akhir	Yusman (teenager)	Debut
1997	Puteri Impian	Zulkifli	
1998	Puteri Impian 2	Zulkifli	
2002	Anak Mami The Movie	Saiful	
2002	Mami Jarum	Partner	
2003	Mistik	Shafiq	
2003	Gila Bola	Adam, Indonesian supporter	
2004	Kuliah Cinta	Johan	
2005	Cinta Fotokopi	Hanif	
2005	Potret Mistik	Jeff	
2005	Anak Mami Kembali	Aerobic gymnast (adult Saiful)	
2008	Cinta U-Turn	Achibo	
2011	Ratu The Movie	Indah spouse	
2012	Bujang Telajak	Leader Gangster	
2012	Misteri Dendam Balan Balan The Movie	Cameo	
2014	Dollah Superstar	Kering	
2016	Operation Mekong	Naw Khar	Hong Kong film, major antagonist

=== Drama ===
Year	Title	Role	TV Channel	Note
2001	Fakulti		TV2	First drama
2007	Pendekar 5	Hang Tuah	TV9	
2008	Ezora	Zahari	TV3	
2014	Jiwa	Zul	TV3	
2014	Ladang	Luqman	TVi	
2014–2015	#Antidot	Fido	TV3	
2016	Budak Magik	Cikgu Razib / Raqib	TV3	Last drama

=== Telefilm ===
Year	Title	Role	Channel TV	Note
2003	Neon	Ringgo	VCD	
2015	Projek Bakar Lemak		TV1	
2016	Naskhah Daripada Cikgu	Abdullah	TV2	Last telefilm
