= Lembing Awang Pulang Ke Dayang =

- Directed by: Majed Salleh
- Written by: Shahroom Hussain
- Produced by: N Azman
- Starring: Farid Kamil; Siti Elizad; Zul Huzaimy; Lynette Ludi; Uji Rashid
- Cinematography: Azizi 'Byg' Borhan
- Edited by: Hafiz Kamaruzaman
- Music by: Mazley Ukays
- Distributed by: Dayang Digital Snd. Bhd
- Release date: 22 October 2009
- Running time: 114 minutes
- Country: Malaysia
- Language: Malay
- Budget: MYR 1.88 Million
- Box office: MYR 0.10 Million

Lembing Awang Pulang Ke Dayang is a 2009 Malaysian Malay-language historical drama film directed by Majed Salleh and starring Farid Kamil, Siti Elizad, Zul Huzaimy, Lynette Ludi and Uji Rashid. The film was produced by Dayang Digital.

== Plot ==
This movie is related to an incident that occurred in Johor. It occurred in 1776 when a man called Awang returned to Parit Raja after more than 3 years abroad to marry his fiancée Dayang. Upon his return, he found out that another man called Bachok had told Dayang of Awang's death and planning to marry her the next day. Awang turned up at the wedding ceremony and using a spear given by Raja Bugis, he speared Bachok in the stomach. Bachok, fatally injured grabbed the spear in his stomach and speared his best man. The man then speared the next man he saw and this was repeated until the 99th person was speared. It was Dayang's father who was protecting Dayang. He did not continue the repeated spearing and died. Awang ran away to Endau and Dayang did not marry another till she died.

== Cast ==
- Farid Kamil - Awang (Main Actor/Actress)
- Siti Elizad - Dayang (Main Actor/Actress)
- Zul Huzaimy - Bachuk (Main Actor/Actress)
- Lynette Ludi - Claudia (Main Actor/Actress)
- Uji Rashid - Mak Long (Supporting Actor)
- Hattan - Panglima Merah (Supporting Actor)
- Aziz M. Osman - Dekar Agas & Raja Muda Bugis (Supporting Actor)
- Mustapha Maarof - Pak Ngah (Supporting Actor)
- Kuswadinata - Pak Long (Supporting Actor)
- Khir Rahman - Nakhoda Galigor (Supporting Actor)
- Datin Hajah Rosnani Jamil : Mak Ngah (Supporting Actor)
- M. Rajoli - Orang Kaya Aris (Supporting Actor)
- Zainurdin Ismail - Tok Beta (Supporting Actor)
- Tamrin Ibrahim Pendek - Pendek (Supporting Actor)
