= Sharizan Borhan =

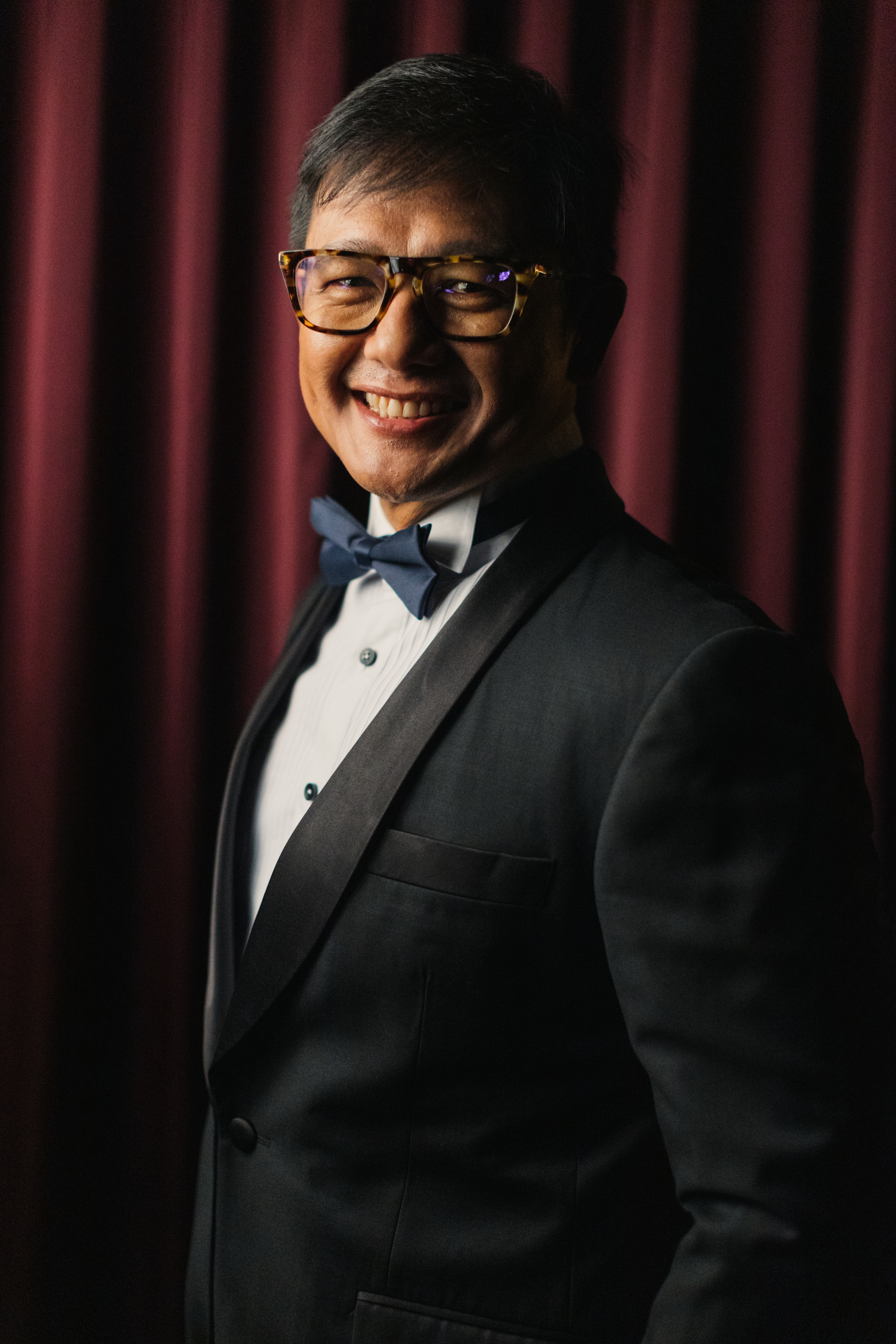
- Sharizan in 2023.

Background information
- Born: December 10, 1974 (age 51); Petaling Jaya, Selangor, Malaysia
- Genres: Pop; R&B; soul; jazz; swing
- Occupations: Musician; singer; emcee; voice-over artist
- Instruments: Vocals
- Years active: 1993–present
- Label: Denoris Records (1995–1997)

Sharizan Borhan (born 10 December 1974) is a Malaysian singer, emcee, and voice-over artist. He is known as the "Malaysia's King of Swing" owing to his passion in swing music. Through his debut studio album, Hadir (1996), Sharizan won the Best New Artiste (Male) Award at the fourth Anugerah Industri Muzik.

== Early life ==
Sharizan Borhan was born on 10 December 1974 in Petaling Jaya, Selangor. He is the youngest of four siblings born to his parents Salina Borhan (born 1947) and Borhan Haron (1943–1981). His father died at the age of 37 when Sharizan was just only 6 years old. His mother was a high school teacher while his father was a police officer.

== Career ==
=== Music ===
In 1993, Sharizan joined Asia Bagus competition where he made it to Grand Finals in Tokyo, Japan. In 1995, he signed with Denoris Records and began worked on his debut recording.

His debut studio album, Hadir, was released in May 1996, which featured the three lead singles "Aku Masih Sayang", "I Am No King" and the title track. The album earned him a Best New Artiste (Male) award at the fourth Anugerah Industri Muzik (AIM) a year later. A televised performance of his song "Kini" during the 1997 Muzik Muzik competition further propelled his status as a rising star. Shortly after his win at the AIM, Denoris Records, the record label he was signed to ceased operations a year after the release of his debut album.

In 2006, his second album Timeless was released, the first live recording of a jazz and swing album by a Malaysian artist in the country.

In 2014, he then re-recorded and executive produced a cover of the classic cha-cha song "Kau Manis Jelita" and "Belaian Jiwa". He was also involved in Musical Theater, notably for "A Slice of Saturday Night".in 2016.

In 2025, Sharizan released his new single "Setiap Detik". An English version of the song, titled "The Only One" was also released at the same time. Both songs were produced by Helen Yap under Magic Nova Productions.

=== Other works ===
Later in his career, Sharizan pursue other interests, which he described as a "survival mode" to support his family. He ventured into hosting television and radio programs, including his stints on Red 104.9 and Lite FM.

As a voice-over artist, he has lent his voice in radio and television commercials for numerous major brands, primarily as both a jingle singer and commercial announcer. His notable roles include voicing the Moon Man"in the Malaysian "Mac Tonight" campaign for McDonald's in 2007, and portraying the Red M&M character in the "Truth or Dare" campaign. He also voiced in the Malay dubbed version of Aladdin in 2019 and was in the Malay dubbed version of Mickey Mouse Clubhouse in 2006 as Goofy, as well as several others for Disney Channel ads in Bahasa Malaysia.

Sharizan has also hosted many TV programs, including Troli Monopoli, Sendaria, Keluarga Ria, Seven Seas and Interzon. He was also one of 3 hosts for 1,2,3; a family program together with Low Ngai Yuen and Sofia Jane.

In 2020 and 2021, he was one of the presenter for the Asia-Pacific Broadcasting Union (ABU), alongside Iman Corinne Adrienne for ABU TV Song Festival 2020 respectively, broadcast by RTM

In 2024, he was featured on the Radio Televisyen Malaysia (RTM) television program Big Band Project season 1 episode 2, where he performed his award-winning song "I Am No King" and Frank Sinatra's classic "The Way You Look Tonight". He was also the host for Big Band Project Season 2, for 5 episodes.

Additionally, Sharizan also appeared in Laugh Die You - Hero Singh Live in KL 2024, a production by Popcorn Studio. He was featured alongside Singaporean artist Gurmit Singh (as Hero Singh) and Kavin Jay.

== Personal life and philanthropy ==
Sharizan marries Samantha Lee Abdullah in 1998. They have three children: Kayra Adriana, Kayden Lee, and Kaylin Adriana. He left for Australia with his family in 2011 and returned to Malaysia in 2014. The couple divorced in 2018, giving him full custody of his children.

He is also involved in community-oriented work. In 2024, alongside Michael Veerapen, Zainal Abidin and Jordan Rivers, he performed at a fund-raising concert, All That Jazz, a tribute to Malaysian jazz musicians.

== Discography ==
=== Studio albums ===
- Hadir (1996)
- Timeless (2006)

=== EPs ===
- Saat Ini (2003)

=== Singles ===
- "Hadir" (1996)
- "Aku Masih Sayang" (1996)
- "I Am No King" (1997)
- "Kini" (1997)
- "Saat Ini" (2003)
- "Belaian Jiwa" (2014)
- "Kau Manis Jelita" (2014)
- "Setiap Detik" (2025)
- "The Only One" (2025)

== Awards and nominations ==
Award(s)	Year	Recipient(s)	Nominated work(s)	Category	Result	Ref(s)
Anugerah Industri Muzik	1997	Sharizan Borhan	Hadir	Best New Artiste (Male)	Won	
