= Happy (Amy Mastura album) =

Studio album by Amy Mastura
- Released: 5 May 2009
- Recorded: 2007–2009
- Studio: Platinum Studios (Kuala Lumpur); Bumble Bee Studios (Jakarta)
- Genre: Pop, R&B
- Length: 40:44
- Label: Sony Music Malaysia
- Producer: Amy Mastura; Goh Boon Hoe

Amy Mastura chronology
Keunggulan Amy Mastura (2007)	Happy (2009)	The Best of Amy Mastura (2012)

Singles from Happy
- 1. "Langkah di Hatimu" Released: 20 July 2009; 2. "Lagu Happy" Released: 6 September 2009; 3. "Bahasa Langit" Released: 8 January 2010

Happy is the seventh and final studio album by Malaysian singer, Amy Mastura, released on 5 May 2009 by Sony Music Malaysia.

== Production ==
Happy was heavily influenced by Amy Mastura. Working again with her former collaborator, Goh Boon Hoe, she become one of the album's producer. Happy is her first album to be produced by Boon Hoe since Bintang Hati (2000). Amy began working on a new material for the album in September 2007.

For the album, Amy Mastura wrote and composed majority of the songs.

== Release and reception ==
The album was released on 5 May 2009, six days before her 38th birthday. "Langkah di Hatimu" was released as the album's first single, followed by "Lagu Happy" and "Bahasa Langit", which was released as her next singles.

== Track listing ==
All tracks are written by Amy Mastura except where noted.

No.	Title	Writer(s)	Length
1.	"Fiesta"	Lah Ahmad	3:52
2.	"Lagu Happy"		3:26
3.	"Bahasa Langit"	Killik	4:10
4.	"Langkah Di Hatimu"		3:07
5.	"Satukan Hati"	Axon, Rizal	2:46
6.	"Dingin Malam"		4:35
7.	"Ini Kasihku"		3:36
8.	"Mencapai Bintang"		3:58
9.	"Jangan Cintakan Aku"	Panji	3:05
10.	"Satu Kecupan"	Putra, Rizal	3:03
Total length:			40:44
