= Hadir (album) =

Studio album by Sharizan Borhan
- Released: August 1996
- Recorded: 1995 – 1996
- Studios: Utusan Audio; Studio Ronggeng; Broadway Studio; Studio 67; Lion Studios
- Genre: Pop
- Length: 52:51
- Label: Denoris Records
- Producers: M. Nasir; Zul Mahat; Adnan Abu Hassan; Helen Yap; Mus Mujiono

Sharizan Borhan chronology
Hadir (1996)	Saat Ini (2003)

Singles from Hadir
- 1. "Hadir" Released: 1996; 2. "Aku Masih Sayang" Released: 1996; 3. "I Am No King" Released: 1997

Hadir (Presence) is the debut studio album by Malaysian singer, Sharizan Borhan, released in August 1996 by Denoris Records. Recorded between 1995 and 1996, the album was his debut after participated in Asia Bagus in 1993 and was a collaboration between Malaysian and Indonesian composers, lyricists, and producers. The album earned him the Best New Male Artist at the fourth Anugerah Industri Muzik a year after the album's release.

== Production ==
Following his participation at the Japanese talent competition show, Asia Bagus, Sharizan Borhan began working on the studio to record materials for what was to become his debut album. The recording for Hadir took place in different recording studios in Malaysia, Singapore and Indonesia between 1995 and 1996. Apart from employing local Malaysian composers and record producers, Sharizan also sourced musicians and artists from Indonesia to contribute to the materials in Hadir.

The album was recorded with Sharizan on both vocals and backing vocals, Hillary Ang on guitars, Irfan Chasmala on keyboards, Embong Rahardjo and Jari on saxophone, and Gary Gideon on drums. Songwriting was handled by Azlan Abu Hassan, who composed two songs, and Mus Mujiono composed three songs while Amran Omar wrote lyrics for three songs. Backing vocals were provided by Lin, Idah and Nina Abu Hassan. In the album, there's only one track recorded in English, entitled "I Am No King". The cover art photography was taken by Malaysian illustrator, Tapa Hidzir. The album was produced by M. Nasir, Zul Mahat, Adnan Abu Hassan, Helen Yap and Mus Mujiono while the mastering process was done in Singapore.

== Release and reception ==
The album was released in August 1996 to popular success. To promote the album, three singles were released from the album: the title track, "Aku Masih Sayang" and "I Am No King". The latter two also made into music videos. The music video for "Aku Masih Sayang" was filmed at a resort in Jakarta, Indonesia.

== Track listing ==
No.	Title	Writer(s)	Length
1.	"Cinta Yang Hilang"	Mus Mujiono	4:45
2.	"Hadir"	Zul Mahat, Amran Omar	4:28
3.	"Aku Masih Sayang"	Georgie Leiwakabessy	6:40
4.	"Kasih Pertama"	Azlan Abu Hassan, Amran Omar	4:27
5.	"Kini"	Azlan Abu Hassan, Johan Nawawi	5:12
6.	"Ku Ingin Bersamamu"	Tito Sumarsono	6:45
7.	"Terbagi Dua"	Mus Mujiono	3:35
8.	"Ajakan"	M. Nasir, S. Amin Shahab	4:23
9.	"Bahtera Rindu"	Adnan Abu Hassan, Amran Omar	5:02
10.	"Malu"	Mus Mujiono	4:05
11.	"I Am No King"	Helen Yap, Stuart L.	4:40
Total length:			52:51

== Release history ==
Region	Release date	Format	Label
Malaysia	August 1996	CD, cassette	Denoris Records

== Awards and nominations ==
Award(s)	Year	Recipient(s)	Nominated work(s)	Category	Result	Ref(s)
Anugerah Industri Muzik	1997	Sharizan Borhan	Hadir	Best New Artiste (Male)	Won	
