= Uji Rashid =

Malaysian singer and actress (born 1953)

- Born: Fuziah binti Haroun Al Rashid; 1 September 1953 (age 73); North Borneo Colony (now modern day Malaysia)
- Occupations: Singer, actress
- Years active: 1971–2016
- Spouse: Jamaluddin Jalil Harahap (m. 1978)
- Children: 2 (notably Cico Harahap)

Fuziah bint Haroun Al Rashid (born 1 September 1953), also known as Uji Rashid, is a Malaysian singer and actress. Her duet "Asmara Bergelora" with Hail Amir was the best-selling song of 1977. Her name became an alternative name for the kandaman fish that lives on the island of Borneo.

== Early life ==
Uji Rashid was born to a Bruneian Malay family. She was raised educated in Bandar Seri Begawan before moving to Kuala Lumpur in the late 1960s, where she joined sports and debate clubs during her high school years.

With a friend, she auditioned for a singing role, and the duet placed third. Afterwards, Ahmad Nawab encouraged her to pursue an entertainment career.

== Career ==
Jamil Sulong, a renowned Malaysian filmmaker and artist from Parit Sulong, recognized her potential. She was cast as the heroine in the film "Permintaan Terakhir" (1975) with Nozie Nani, Datuk Sani Abdullah, and Yusof Haslam (father of Syafiq Yusof). She also gained wide acclaim with "Asmara Bergelora," a duet with Hail Amir, which was the best-selling song of 1977 in Malaysia.

Some of her other roles included: Jiwa Remaja (1975), Menanti Hari Esok (1977) and Dendang Perantau (1979).

== Discography ==
=== EP albums ===
- Uji Rashid (1975) [EMI]
- Semakin Hari Semakin Sayang (1976) [EMI]

=== Studio albums ===
- Ku Kekosongan (1976) [EMI]
- Kali Terakhir Ku Lihat Wajahmu (1977) [EMI]
- Mengapa Derita Yang Di Cari (1980) [WEA]
- Mengapa Berjauhan (1981) [WEA]
- Merpati (1984) [CBS/SONY]
- Bisikan Hati (1988) [Soundwaves]
- Bukan Terpaksa (1999) [EMI]

=== Duets ===
- Antara Matamu dan Mataku (1976) (with Hail Amir) [EMI]
- Hujan (1977) (bersama Hail Amir) [EMI]
- Ku Kejar Bayangan Mu (1980) (bersama Hail Amir) [WEA]
- Melayu Klasik (1995) [EMI]

=== Albums ===
- Kenangan Manis – Siri Mat Jimat EMI (1993)
- Asmara Bergelora (with Hail Amir)
- 1975–1977 Vol. 1 & 2 – Siri Perdana EMI (1997)
- Cerita Asmaraku (with Hail Amir) Vol. 1 & 2
- Memori Hit 2 – Warner Music (2009)
- Siri Biografi – Warner Music-EMI (2011)
- Siri Lagenda Hit (2013)
- Siri Bintang Pujaan (2014)
- Koleksi Lagu-Lagu Terbaik – Warner Music (2015)

== Filmography ==
=== Film ===
- 1975: Permintaan Terakhir
- 1975: Jiwa Remaja
- 1977: Menanti Hari Esok
- 1979: Dendang Perantau
- 1981: Langit Tidak Selalu Cerah
- 1989: Yassin
- 2004: Misteri Dendam Balan Balan The Movie
- 2009: Lembing Awang Pulang Ke Dayang

=== Television ===
- 1980: PUTERI TAWANAN (Panggung): Ahmad Tamimi Siregar
- SAYANG ADIK SAYANG: Abu Bakar Omar
- 1980: WAJAH SAYA, OTAK AWAK: Baharuddin Hj. Omar
- KELOPAK BUNGA PUTIH: Jalaluddin Hassan
- MAAF TAK TERUCAP: Abu Bakar Kassim
- HIDAYAT (Siri): Jalaluddin Hassan/Azizah Mahzan/Azean Irdawaty/Yusni Jaafar/Wan Maimunah/Hamidah Wahab
- 2012: SPAGETTI KUAH LODEH: Hail Amir/Liza Abdullah/Azhan Rani/Adira

=== Theater ===
- 1973: KUALA LUMPUR KUALA LUMPUR
- 1975: UDA DAN DARA
- 1975: HANG TUAH
- 1986: TANAH BERNANAH (Lily Patra)
- 1988: CINDAI (Ahmad Yatim, Rahim Razali & Ahmad Tarmimi Siregar)
- 1989: INTAN SITI RAHIMAH (Eman Manan)
- 1994: MALAM INI PENYU MENANGIS (Sofia Jane and Sabri Yunus)
- 1995: Primadona (Zaidi Omar, Bohari Ibrahim and Kartina Aziz)
- 2012: SUMPAH RAJA BERSIONG

== Personal life ==
Uji Rashid married Jamaluddin Jamil Harahap, a businessman from Batak region, Indonesia, in 1978. They had two children, Cico Harahap and Yazmeen. Uji Rashid retired in 2016 due to her son's partial paralysis from septic shock.
