= Puteri Impian =

- Poster
- Directed by: Aziz M. Osman
- Written by: Aziz M. Osman
- Produced by: Khalil Mohd. Zain
- Starring: Amy Mastura; Cico Harahap; Hairie Othman; Nor Aliah Lee
- Music by: Azman Abu Hassan
- Release date: 1997
- Running time: 107 minutes
- Country: Malaysia
- Language: Malay

Puteri Impian (English: Dream Princess) is a 1997 Malaysian Malay-language romantic comedy film directed by Aziz M. Osman and starring Amy Mastura, Cico Harahap, Hairie Othman and Nor Aliah Lee. The film follows the adventures of a young woman who wins the chance to be in a "princess" for ten days in a reality television show. The film is dedicated to Princess Diana, who died not long before the film was released.

A sequel titled Puteri Impian 2 was released the following year in 1998. The film is also credited for inspiring the creation of a Malaysian sitcom called Puteri, which has a similar premise. Of note, Amy Mastura sang the theme song of the Puteri series.

== Plot ==
Puteri Nora Mat Jidin is a young factory worker living in a rented apartment with her best friends in Kuala Lumpur. Despite being a tomboy, Nora has always dreamed of escaping poverty and becoming a princess. Following the success of a popular local reality show called 'Chasing Dream', Nora sends in her application with the hope that her dreams will come true for at least a short period of time. Her application is successful and she is called to the TV station.

Nora is given a makeover and she is given the chance to stay at the most luxurious penthouse suite of one of the most expensive hotels in the city for a week. The only letdown of the experience is the show's cameraman, Zulfikli has to follow her around the entire time to record her experience. The two do not get along very well since Zul loves to make fun of Nora's naive attitude. To add to her misery, the show's producer, Miss Nancy Lee tries to control her every move to get higher ratings. Nora starts to realize that the show is not as fun as she had expected it to be.

As the week comes to an end, Nora is made to go horse riding with Zul by her side as one of her last activities for the show. When her horse losses control, she is saved by Tengku Faizal, a real life prince. The two develop a friendship as Faizal is attracted to Nora's simplicity and humility. Zul starts to become jealous and warns Faizal to stop playing with Nora's feelings. However, Faizal surprises everyone by proposing to Nora.

To prove to everyone that he is serious about Nora, Faizal takes her to meet his mother, the Queen. Realizing that this can boost her show's ratings even more, Nancy starts treating Nora kindly. However, Nora can see through Nancy's intentions and confronts her about her hypocrisy. Meanwhile, Zul starts to realize that he has actually fallen in love with Nora and can no longer stand her being around Faizal. As a result, he requests that he be transferred to another show. He is then replaced with Kuman, another cameraman. Nora also starts to miss Zul now that he is no longer with her.

In the end, Faizal decides to take Nora with him to America to meet his father who is there for work. However, as they are about to leave the hotel for the airport, Nora sees Faizal and realizes that royal life is not for her. She has always been happier as a commoner and she decides to make her own living. She leaves Faizal and returns to her friends.

== Cast ==
- Amy Mastura as Puteri Nora Mat Jidin
- Cico Harahap as Zulkifli
- Nor Aliah Lee as Nancy Lee
- Hairie Othman as Tengku Faizal
- Kuman as the Cameraman Kuman
- Azwan Ali as TV Presenter Azwan Ali
- Sophia Ibrahim as the Queen

== Soundtrack ==
Although the film does not have an official soundtrack, actress Amy Mastura released a studio album titled "Puteri", which contains a number of songs that were used in the film. The track list of this album is as follows:

1. Hanya Dalam Lagu
2. Puteri
3. Gema Rembulan
4. Cinta 2 Jiwa
5. Kasih Ku
6. Halaman Sejahtera
7. Izinkan
8. Di Antara Cinta
9. Suatu Masa Suatu Ketika
10. Terimalah Aku

== Awards ==
| Award | Category | Receiver | Decision |
|---|---|---|---|
| 14th Malaysian Film Festival | Best Actress | Amy Mastura | Won |
| 14th Malaysian Film Festival | Best Supporting Actress | Nor Aliah Lee | Won |
| 14th Malaysian Film Festival | The Best Sound Designer | Azman Hassan | Won |
| Screen Award and Popular Star 1997/98 | Best Supporting Actress | Nor Aliah Lee | Won |
