= Akan Datang =

Studio album by Amy Mastura
- Released: 24 June 2002
- Recorded: 2001–2002
- Studios: Prodigi Studio; KRU Studios; 101 Studio; Nada Studio
- Genres: Pop, R&B
- Length: 44:22
- Label: Sony Music Malaysia
- Producers: Azlan Abu Hassan; Shamril Salleh; Zul Mahat; Iman Wan; KRU

Amy Mastura chronology
Bintang Hati (2000)	Akan Datang (2002)	Lebih Baik (2005)

Singles from Akan Datang
- 1. "Akan Datang" Released: 15 May 2002; 2. "Kasih Suci" Released: 1 August 2002; 3. "Hati Berlagu" Released: 13 October 2002; 4. "Bulan Bertemu Bintang" Released: 7 January 2003; 5. "Satu Dalam Sejuta" Released: 16 April 2003

Akan Datang is the fifth studio album by Malaysian singer, Amy Mastura, released on 24 June 2002 by Sony Music Malaysia. The album, with a similar beat to her earlier albums, was well received. However, Amy Mastura embroiled in a controversy surrounding one of her songs in the album.

== Production ==
After the release of Bintang Hati (2000), Amy Mastura broke off her four album collaboration with Goh Boon Hoe as she was looking a different for her next albums and decided to record a new album as soon as possible. She approached Azlan Abu Hassan, Shamril Salleh, Zul Mahat, Iman Wan and KRU to be the producers for her new album, replacing Boon Hoe, who had produced her first four albums.

In the album, Amy Mastura composed and wrote "Kasih Suci", which was specially dedicated to her eldest daughter, Adrianna Alvin Tham, who was a year old then. "Akan Datang" was chosen to become the title of the new album. The cover art photography was taken by Brandon at the Studio ROM, featuring six different poses of Amy on the album sleeve.

== Release and reception ==
Akan Datang was released on 24 June 2002. However, not long after the album's release, Amy Mastura drews controversy when "Satu Dalam Sejuta", one of the songs in Akan Datang, also included in Malaysian singer Malisa Janudin's debut album. Despite the controversy, the album sold well. Although the album was well received, some fans also expressed their disappointment over the album's cover art quality, which they said is to be more thin than her previous albums.

Five singles were released from the album, including the title track and "Kasih Suci", which both songs made into music videos. The album also won the 9th Anugerah Industri Muzik for the Best Album Cover and the Best Music Video (for "Kasih Suci").

== Track listing ==
No.	Title	Writer(s)	Length
1.	"Akan Datang"	Iman Wan, Amran Omar	3:38
2.	"Kembara Cinta"	Azlan Abu Hassan, Amran Omar	4:21
3.	"Asimilasi"	Azlan Abu Hassan, Ucu	4:29
4.	"Satu Dalam Sejuta"	KRU	4:20
5.	"Dulu, Kini dan Selamanya"	Shazza, Amy Mastura	4:54
6.	"Keranamu"	Azlan Abu Hasaan, Ucu	4:03
7.	"Hati Berlagu"	Zulfekar, Amran Omar	4:52
8.	"Kelip Kelip"	Pak Ngah, Aminah Rhapor	4:20
9.	"Bulan Bertemu Bintang"	Nurzaidi Rahman	4:01
10.	"Kasih Suci"	Amy Mastura	4:41
Total length:			44:22
