= Puteri (Amy Mastura album) =

Studio album by Amy Mastura
- Released: 1 November 1997
- Recorded: 1996–1997
- Studios: Booty Boys Studio; Synchrosound Studios; Twin Studios; Studio 67; Nearfield Studio; Audio One
- Genres: Pop, R&B
- Length: 45:38
- Label: Pony Canyon
- Producers: Goh Boon Hoe; Boon Tan

Amy Mastura chronology
Pujaanku (1996)	Puteri (1997)	The Best of Amy Mastura (1998)

Singles from Puteri
- 1. "Di Antara Kita" Released: 4 October 1997; 2. "Hanya Dalam Lagu" Released: 11 November 1997; 3. "Gema Rembulan" Released: 2 December 1997; 4. "Puteri" Released: 8 February 1998

Puteri is a third studio album by Malaysian singer, Amy Mastura, released on 1 November 1997 by Pony Canyon.

== Production ==
Puteri was Amy Mastura's third album, following the massive success of her first two albums, a self-titled debut album (1994) and Pujaanku (1996), which was well-received upon release. The album was recorded in six different recording studios, including Booty Boys Studio and Synchrosound Studios. For the first time in her music career, Amy Mastura composed and wrote the lyrics for the titular song, which is the album's shortest track.

Songwriting was handled by Azlan Abu Hassan, Azmeer and Helen Yap, which they composed two songs respectively. Backing vocals were provided by singers Azlina Abu Hassan, Liza Aziz, Lynn Ali and Amy Mastura herself. Singer, composer and recorder producer Ajai provided backing vocals for "Izinkanlah".

In the album, Amy Mastura re-recorded two old songs – "Gema Rembulan", which made famous by Dutch singer, Anneke Grönloh in 1950s, and "Kasihku", by Rahim Maarof from his 1988 album, Kristal. There's another song in the album, entitled "Hanya Dalam Lagu" which was originally intended to be given to Siti Nurhaliza, but was later given to Amy. Puteri would be the last studio album Amy Mastura released under Pony Canyon as her contract with the label ended in December 1997. However, she went on to release her last two albums with Pony Canyon later, namely The Best of Amy Mastura and Versi Remix.

== Release and reception ==
Puteri was released on 1 November 1997 to popular success, with "Puteri" and "Cinta Dua Jiwa" was released as lead singles. Songs in the album were used as a soundtrack for the 1997 film which starring Amy Mastura, Puteri Impian, directed by Aziz M. Osman.

== Track listing ==
No.	Title	Writer(s)	Length
1.	"Hanya Dalam Lagu"	Azmeer	4:12
2.	"Puteri"	Amy Mastura	2:30
3.	"Gema Rembulan"	J. Boyle, D. Baharein	4:04
4.	"Cinta Dua Jiwa"	Helen Yap, Hani MJ	4:45
5.	"Kasihku"	Mona Vera, Azman Abu Hassan, Johan Nawawi	4:44
6.	"Halaman Sejahtera"	Helen Yap, Amran Omar	4:31
7.	"Izinkan"	Nasser Abu Kassim, Ajai	4:14
8.	"Di Antara Cinta"	Azlan Abu Hassan, Ucu	4:02
9.	"Suatu Masa Suatu Ketika"	Azmeer, Azmira	4:02
10.	"Terimalah Aku"	Azlan Abu Hassan Amran Omar	4:37
Total length:			45:38
