= Kampong Tumasek =

Neighbourhood in Bandar Seri Begawan, Brunei

Tumasek
- Village
- Kampong Tumasek
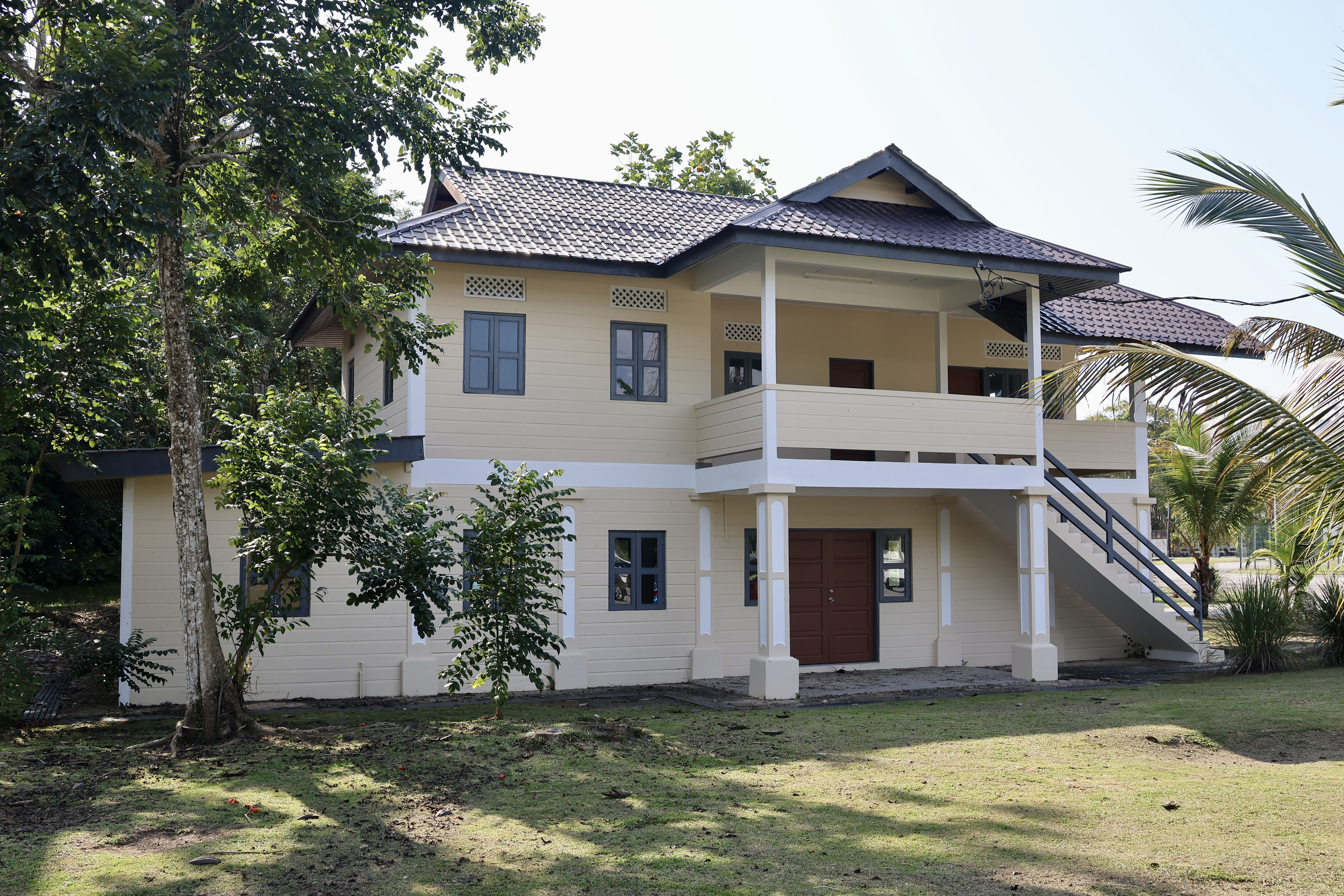
- Istana Banderung Kayangan

- Location in Brunei
- Coordinates: 4°52′39″N 114°55′15″E
- Country: Brunei
- District: Brunei-Muara
- Mukim: Kianggeh

Government
  - Village head: Lawi Lamat

Population (2016)
  - Total: 673
- Time zone: UTC+8 (BNT)
- Postcode: BA2112

Kampong Tumasek (Malay: Kampung Tumasek) or simply known as Tumasek, is an area in Bandar Seri Begawan, the capital of Brunei, as well as a village within Mukim Kianggeh in Brunei-Muara District. The population was 673 in 2016. It has the postcode BA2112.

== Etymology ==
When the Hindu Empire of Majapahit in Java rose to power in the 15th century, Brunei, a kingdom of the Sumatran Buddhist Srivijaya Empire, fell. Islam was introduced in Brunei through the Sultanate of Tumasek (formerly known as Singapore), although recent research suggests that this may have happened as early as the 13th century. The sultans of Borneo eventually gained independence.

== Infrastructure ==
A Brunei Shell Petroleum (BSP) petrol station sits within the area on Jalan Tutong. In addition to this, a fire station exist in the village.

=== Government ===
- Grand Chamberlain's Office is the official office for the grand chamberlain, located within the grounds of Istana Darul Hana.

=== Places of interest ===
- Istana Banderung Kayangan (Banderung Kayangan Palace) or formerly known as Istana Tumasek, is located near Istana Darul Hana's surau and at the rear entrance to Istana Nurul Iman. The palace was constructed in the 1930s and made of concrete (cement) pillars and entirely wooden. A restoration project was carried out in the 1970s. Notably, this building was the venue for Sultan Omar Ali Saifuddien III's wedding ceremony with Pengiran Anak Damit on 6 September 1941.
- Istana Darul Hana (Darul Hana Palace) is the former 6 acres (2.4 ha) official residence and office of Sultan Omar Ali Saifuddien III since its opening on 20 May 1951. It was mainly constructed out of concrete and cement on a hill, overlooking the Brunei River. It was used for that purpose up until 1987, where it was relocated to its present day residence at Istana Nurul Iman.

== Notable people ==
- Metassan Sabtu Kamaluddin (died 1988), nobleman
