= Ross Ariffin =

Malaysian composer and record producer (1962–2025)

Roslan Ariffin Jamil (28 May 1962 – 2 August 2025) was a Malaysian composer and record producer.

== Life and career ==
Ross was born on 28 May 1962. Throughout his career his songs have been performed by numerous Malaysian singers, including Siti Nurhaliza, Fauziah Latiff and Ning Baizura. He has received the Anugerah Juara Lagu.

Ross died on 2 August 2025, at the age of 63.
