= Lebih Baik =

Studio album by Amy Mastura
- Released: December 2005
- Recorded: 2003–2005
- Studios: King Studio; Rumie Studio; Excellent Tunes; Fuse Studio; 101 Studio
- Genres: Pop, R&B
- Length: 43:05
- Label: Sony BMG Music Entertainment Malaysia
- Producers: Amy Mastura; Azlan Abu Hassan; Aidit Alfian; Cat Farish; Audi Mok; Julfekar

Amy Mastura chronology
Akan Datang (2002)	Lebih Baik (2005)	Keunggulan Amy Mastura (2007)

Singles from Lebih Baik
- 1. "Bukakanlah Pintu" Released: 13 November 2005; 2. "Kasihku Sinar" Released: 12 January 2006; 3. "Bingung" Released: 8 April 2006; 4. "Cinta" Released: 18 July 2006

Lebih Baik is the sixth studio album by Malaysian singer, Amy Mastura, released in December 2005 by Sony Music Malaysia. The album, which was recorded between 2003 and 2005, was poorly received, leading Amy Mastura to take a four-year sabbatical from recording any albums.

== Production ==
Lebih Baik was Amy Mastura's sixth album and her third with Sony Music Malaysia, which in turn become Sony BMG Music Entertainment Malaysia.

== Release and reception ==
Lebih Baik was released in December 2005, with "Bukakanlah Pintu" become its first single. Other songs also released as singles include "Bingung", "Kasihku Sinar" and "Kata Mama". The album was poorly received and its sales were lackluster, but it receive any critical praise upon release.

== Track listing ==
No.	Title	Writer(s)	Length
1.	"Bukakanlah Pintu"	Azlan Abu Hassan, Ucu	3:59
2.	"Kasihku Sinar"	Anuar Zain, Hazami, Amy Mastura	4:04
3.	"Lebih Baik"	Asmin Mudin	4:17
4.	"Penghujung Hari"	Azlan Abu Hassan, Mohariz Yaakup	4:25
5.	"Kata Mama"	Aidit Alfian, Ad Samad	4:18
6.	"Bingung"	Cat Farish	4:38
7.	"Ku Lukiskan Angan"	Tam Spider, Loloq	4:37
8.	"Teman Jiwa"	Audi Mok, Amran Omar	4:35
9.	"Mungkinkah Nanti"	Julfekar, Datu Badd	4:08
10.	"Cinta"	Amy Mastura	4:23
Total length:			43:05
