= Amy Mastura (album) =

Studio album by Amy Mastura
- Released: 4 September 1994
- Recorded: January – August 1994
- Studios: RMP Studios, Kuala Lumpur
- Genres: Pop, R&B
- Length: 44:02
- Label: Pony Canyon
- Producer: Goh Boon Hoe

Amy Mastura chronology
Amy Mastura (1994)	Pujaanku (1996)

Singles from Amy Mastura
- 1. "Kasih" Released: 15 June 1994; 2. "Jawapan Kasih" Released: 10 September 1994; 3. "Meniti Hari" Released: 7 January 1995

Amy Mastura is a debut studio album by Malaysian singer, Amy Mastura, released on 4 September 1994 by Pony Canyon. The album is the debut of her after winning in a talent competition show by Fuji Television, Asia Bagus, where she recorded in early 1994. The album is self-titled, and composed almost entirely of pop and ballad genre with its notable singles like "Meniti Hari" and "Jawapan Kasih", which was regarded as her signature songs.

== Production ==
In 1993, Amy Mastura joined Asia Bagus talent show in Japan and became its runner-up. Following her winning at the show, she was signed to Pony Canyon for a 5-album deal, initially to record an English-language album. Amy Mastura agreed upon the condition that she would be given creative freedom to choose the material for her album of her own. She later took decision to record a Malay-language album as it was suitable for her rather than recorded songs in English and Japanese.

Prior to her debut album's release, Amy released her debut single with composer and record producer Azmeer, entitled "Harapan Semalam". The album was recorded in eight months, from January to August 1994 at the RMP Studios in Kuala Lumpur. The album's recording hours were also affected due to her work schedule as a stewardess at the Malaysia Airlines. Japanese composer, Tetsuji Hayashi composed a song titled "Istimewa". Goh Boon Hoe composed two songs for the album - "Ucapan" and "Suria Khatulistiwa". Amran Omar and actor Azmil Mustapha wrote the lyrics for two songs respectively, with Amran wrote the lyrics for "Meniti Hari" and "Warkah Biru", while Azmil wrote the lyrics for "Flora dan Fauna" and "Istimewa".

In the album, there is a song called "Kasih", written by Ron and Israeli composer Noam Kaniel and written by Iriyantie E. This song was quite popular among many people due to its beautiful lyrics and melody. Amy Mastura found this difficult and took six takes to record "Kasih" as she wanted to "get the right feel" for the song.

== Release and reception ==
The album was released on 4 September 1994 in Malaysia and on 21 October in Japan, with "Kasih", "Meniti Hari" and "Jawapan Kasih" released as lead singles. "Warkah Biru" and "Suria Khatulistiwa" were later released as further singles. The album was well received upon release and sold over 50,000 copies in 4 months after its release. As of April 1996, the album sold over 100,000 copies and certified Double Platinum and in Japan, the album sold 100,000 copies and certified Gold.

Roslen Fadzil of Harian Metro called the album as "the special one", while Zulkifli Ali of Berita Minggu also praised the album.

== Track listing ==
No.	Title	Writer(s)	Length
1.	"Jawapan Kasih"	Azmira, Halim	4:39
2.	"Kasih"	Noam Kaniel, Ron, Iriyantie E	3:58
3.	"Meniti Hari"	Fauzi Marzuki, Amran Omar	5:10
4.	"Warkah Biru"	Ross Ariffin, Amran Omar	3:52
5.	"Menunggu Kau Pulang"	Helen Yap, Johan Nawawi	4:49
6.	"Ucapan"	Goh Boon Hoe, Seri Bayu	3:41
7.	"Flora dan Fauna"	Mazlan Hamzah, Marliza, Azmil Mustapha	4:26
8.	"Suria Khatulistiwa"	Goh Boon Hoe, Zaid Yusoff	4:34
9.	"Istimewa"	Tetsuji Hayashi, Azmil Mustapha	3:46
10.	"Mana Janji Mu"	Boedy Bahtian	4:31
Total length:			44:02

== Personnel ==
Credits adapted from Amy Mastura booklet liner notes.

- Amy Mastura – vocals, background vocals
- Goh Boon Hoe – producer, mixer
- Zaid Yusoff – recorder, mixer
- Rahim – mixer
- Jamil Mohamed – promotion
- Azie – promotion
- Zulfazli Suhadi – make-up artist
- Yaohan – wardrobe
- Yellow Studio – artwork
- Len's Studio – photography

== Certifications ==
Region	Certification	Certified units/sales
Malaysia	2× Platinum	100,000
Japan (RIAJ)	Gold	100,000

== Release history ==
Region	Release date	Format	Label
Malaysia	4 September 1994	CD, cassette, digital download	Pony Canyon
Japan	21 October 1994	CD, cassette, digital download	Pony Canyon
