= Istana Darul Hana =

Palace in Brunei

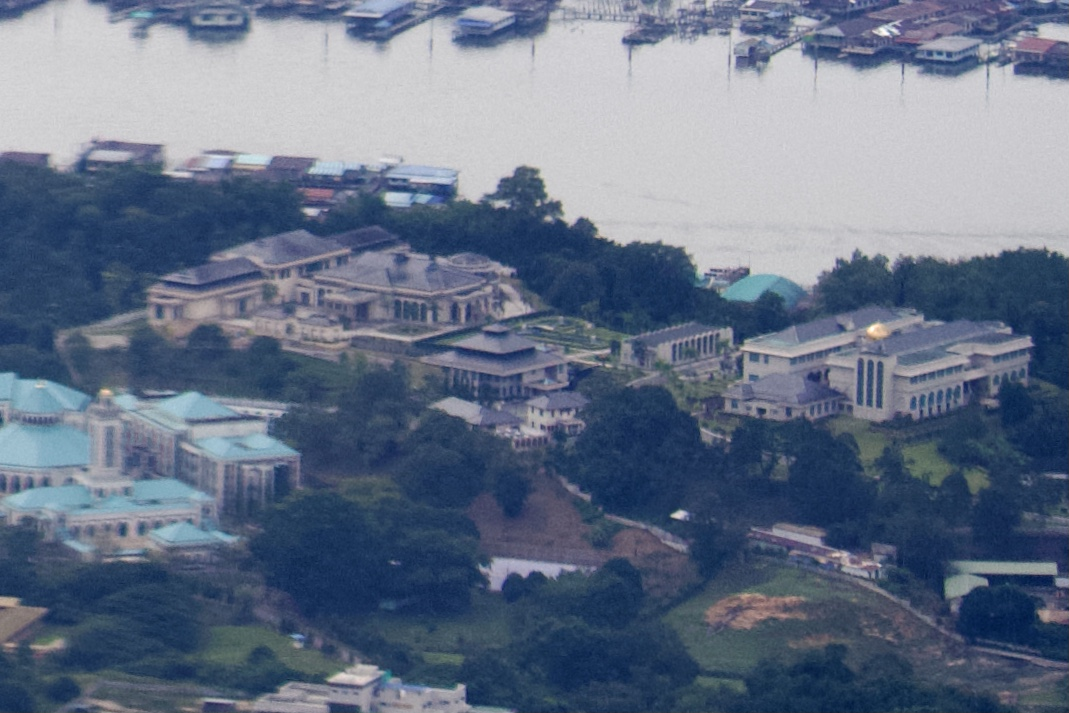
- Istana Darul Hana in 2022
- Interactive map of the Istana Darul Hana area
- Alternative names: Istana Lama

General information
- Type: Residence
- Architectural style: Malay
- Location: Jalan Darul Hana, Tumasek, Bandar Seri Begawan, Brunei–Muara, Brunei
- Coordinates: 4.8796904°N 114.9287151°E
- Year built: 1950–1951
- Opened: 10 May 1951; 74 years ago

Technical details
- Material: concrete and cement
- Size: 6 acres (2.4 ha)

The Istana Darul Hana (English: Darul Hana Palace) is one of the few remaining palaces in Brunei. It was the residence of Omar Ali Saifuddien III from 1951 to 1987. The palace is located on a hill at Kilometre 3 of Jalan Tutong in Kampong Tumasek, Brunei–Muara District, Brunei. It is sometimes referred to as Istana Lama.

== Etymology ==
The English translation of the two Arabic phrases "Darul Hana" is "Happy Country," and it has no religious connotations. It is widely believed that Sultan Omar Ali Saifuddien III named the palace "Darul Hana" after Sarawak, a former possession of the Brunei Sultanate. It can also be translated to "peace and tranquility."

== Design and features ==
Istana Darul Hana, built alongside and facing the Brunei River, was initially constructed using concrete and cement. It covers an estimated area of 6 acres (2.4 ha). A few notable aspects of the palace is its water fountain, Show Room, Balai Indera Kenchana, Balai Singgahsana, and Regalia House. Since its completion, the palace has seen expansions and additions. This is the first palace constructed completely of cement. According to a 1974 report at the palace, "Extensions to Princesses' Apartments and Remodelling of the Store Roof" were noted. In 1977, the "Istana Banquat Hall Drawing" was completed which consisted of 2000 chairs and 200 tables.

== History ==
During his third term as British Resident to Brunei beginning in August 1948, Eric Ernest Falk Pretty strongly supported the construction of a new palace for Sultan Ahmad Tajuddin. Recognising Brunei's growing wealth and the importance of upholding royal dignity, Pretty was sympathetic to the Sultan's desire for improved living conditions. He helped facilitate discussions between the Sultan and the British government regarding the palace, believing that Brunei's resources should benefit its own people. Pretty later expressed regret that Sultan did not live to see the completion of the new palace.

Built in 1950 and completed in 1951 during the reign of Sultan Omar Ali Saifuddien III, the palace became his official residence and office later that year, on 10 May. Located on a hill along Kilometre 3 of Jalan Tutong (now Jalan Raja Isteri Pengiran Anak Hajah Saleha), it served as the backdrop for numerous significant historical events throughout Sultan Omar Ali Saifuddien III's reign. The palace continued be used until the completion of the new Istana Nurul Iman around 1987. As of 2009, it is one of the only three remaining active palaces that still exists in the country, with the other two being Istana Nurul Iman and Istana Nurul Izzah. (Note: In 1997, it was reported that Prince Sufri Bolkiah resided in the palace.)

== Events ==
During its time of service, the palace was frequently used to celebrate and commemorate royal engagements. It was also where then-Prince Hassanal Bolkiah received his early education through private tuition at the palace's surau before attending higher education in both Brunei and Malaysia. Sultan Omar Ali Saifuddien III revived ancient royal customs and ceremonies passed down from previous sultans to ensure that they were known and practiced by the people of Brunei. Among these revived traditions were the awarding of honours in ceremonies held since 1954 and the royal wedding procession of Princess Nor'ain and Pengiran Anak Mohammad Yusof in 1967.

In order to compel the sultan to proclaim the Federal State of North Kalimantan during the 1962 Brunei revolt, the rebels of the Brunei People's Party had planned and attempted to kidnap the sultan, but were not successful. The sultan and his family were still at the palace on the night of the uprising, joined by a number of state dignitaries and six police officers.

Several key historical events held at Istana Darul Hana consisted of the birth of Prince Sufri Bolkiah on 31 July 1952, followed by the birth of Prince Jefri Bolkiah on 6 November 1954. On 17 February 1965, the sultan and his wife hosted Lord Mountbatten and his daughter Lady Brabourne during a state banquet. Later that year, on 29 July, the royal wedding of Crown Prince Hassanal Bolkiah and Pengiran Anak Saleha took place at the palace. On 4 October 1967, the palace witnessed the abdication of Sultan Omar Ali Saifuddien III, and on 5 October, he passed the throne to his son, Crown Prince Hassanal Bolkiah, who became Sultan Hassanal Bolkiah. On 7 May 1968, the sultan conferred the title of Pehin to Abbas Al-Sufri, followed by further honours to Isa Ibrahim and Haji Awang Jair bin Ja'afar later that month. The palace would again host significant events, including the 1969 wedding of Princess Masna and Pengiran Anak Abdul Aziz, and the births of Princess Rashidah Sa'adatul Bolkiah on 26 July 1969, Princess Muta-Wakkilah Hayatul Bolkiah on 12 October 1971, and then-Prince Al-Muhtadee Billah on 17 February 1974.

== Gallery ==
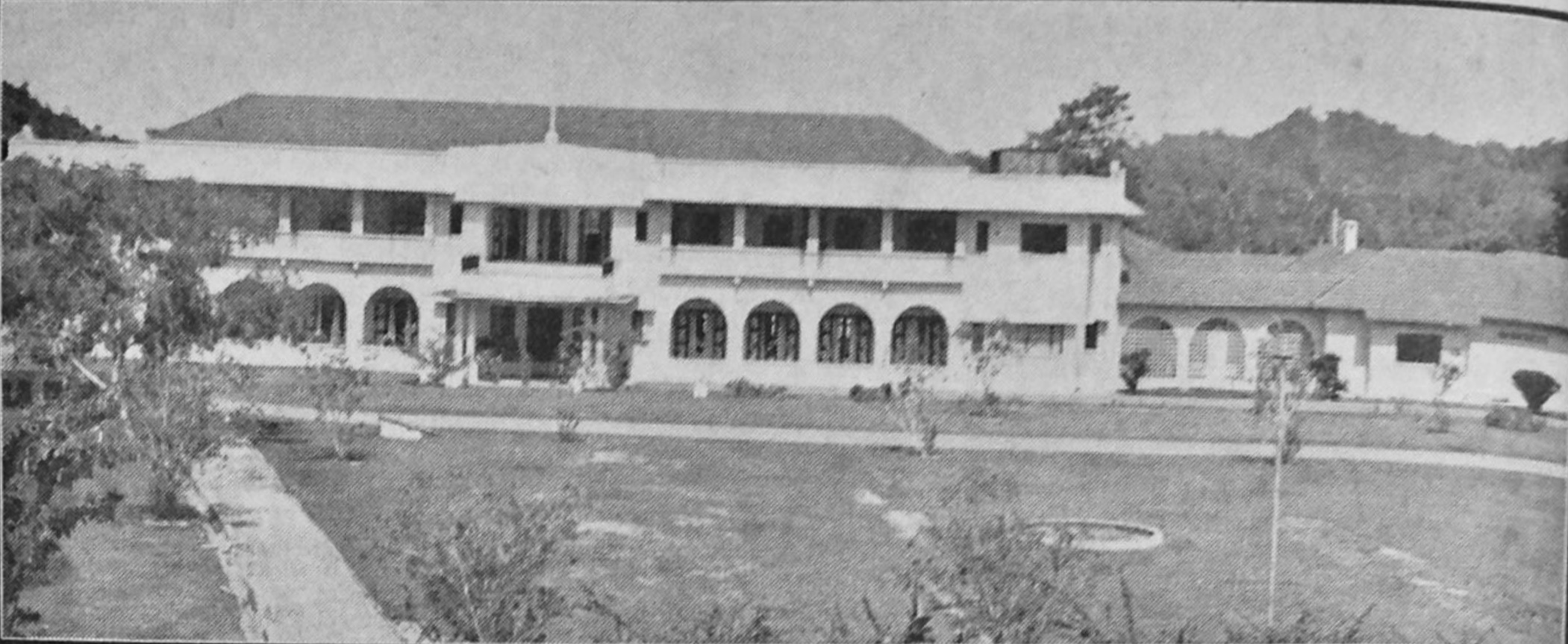
Section of the palace in 1959

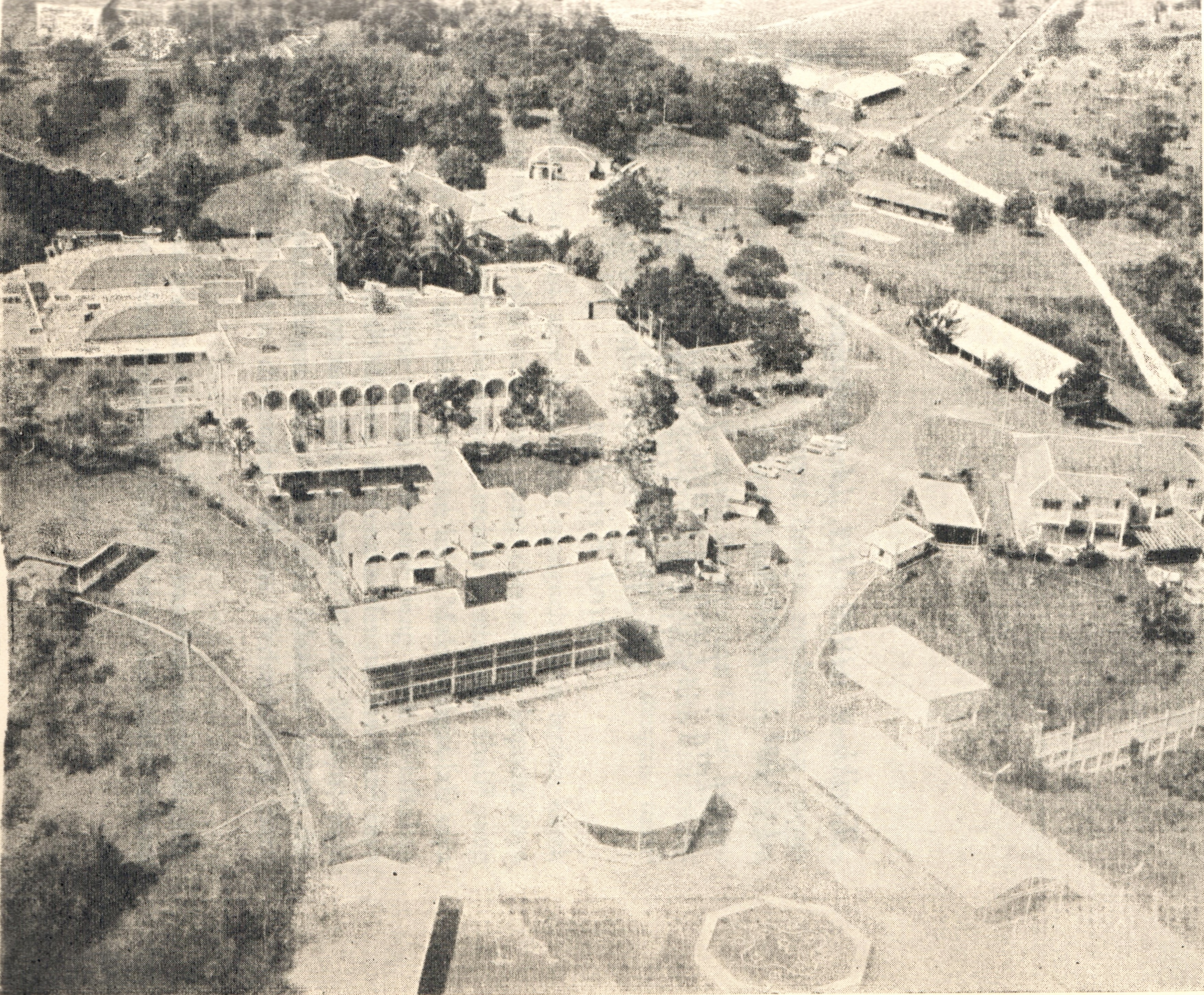
Aerial view of the palace in 1959

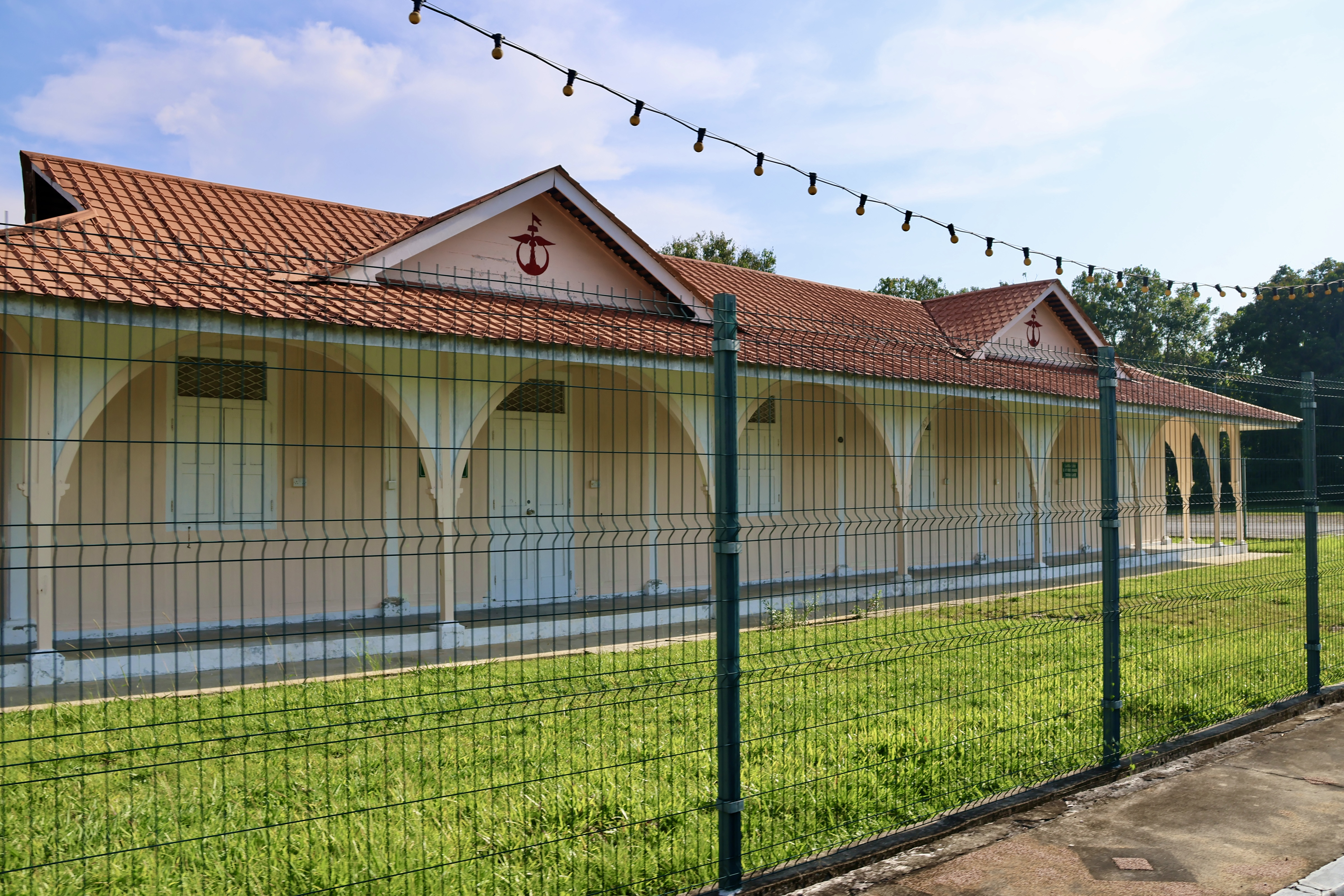
The palace's surau

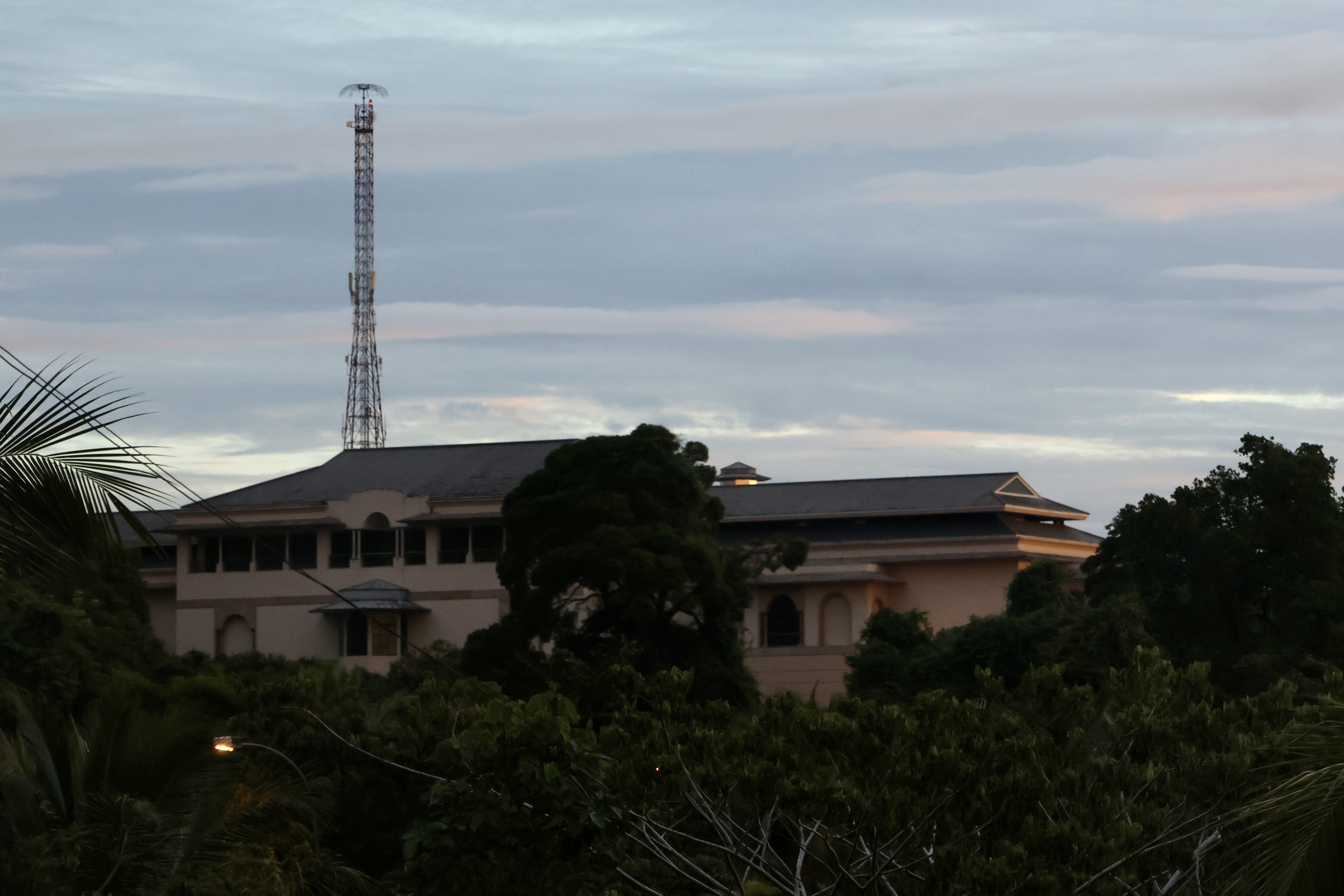
Northwestern face of the palace

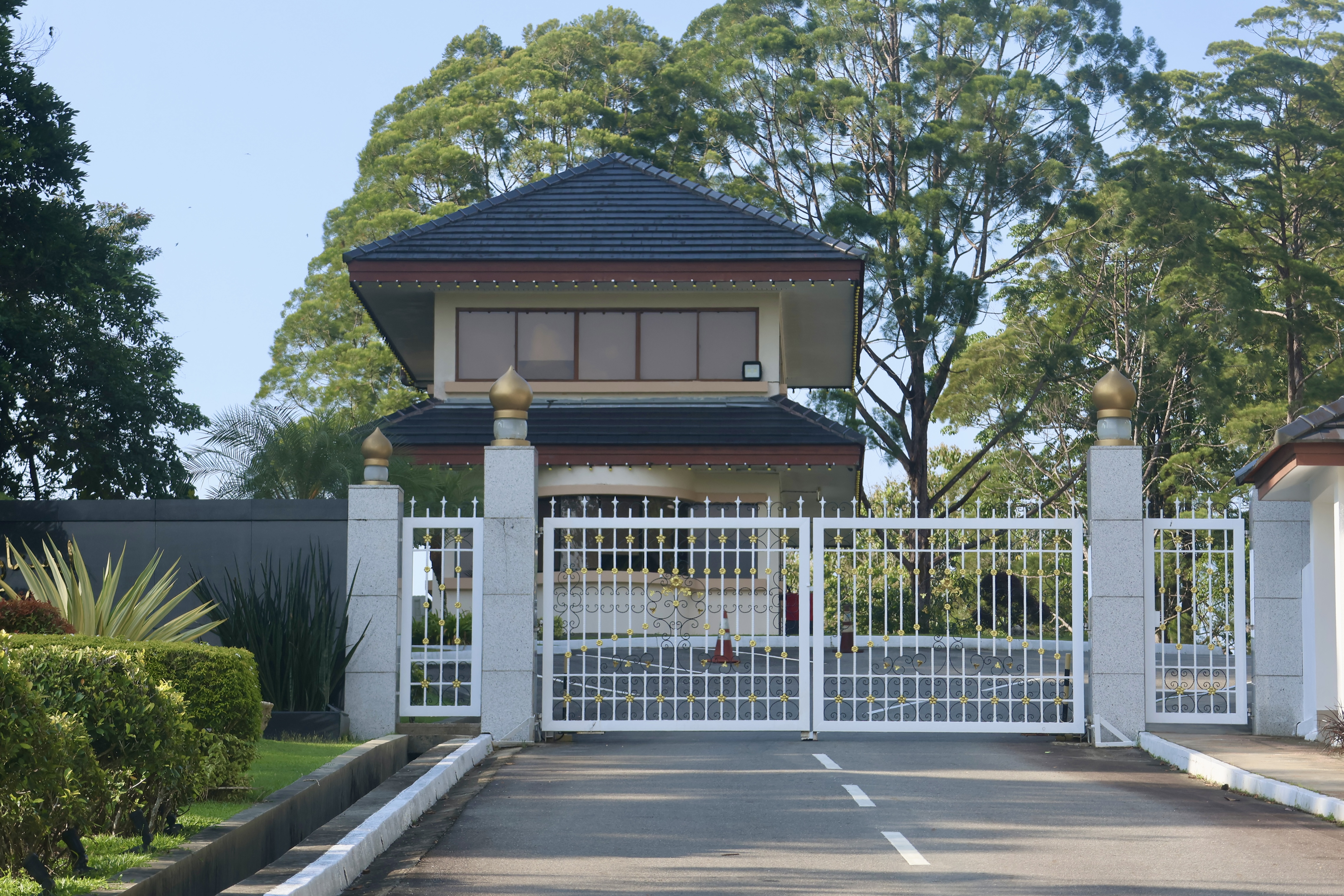
Southeastern gate to the palace

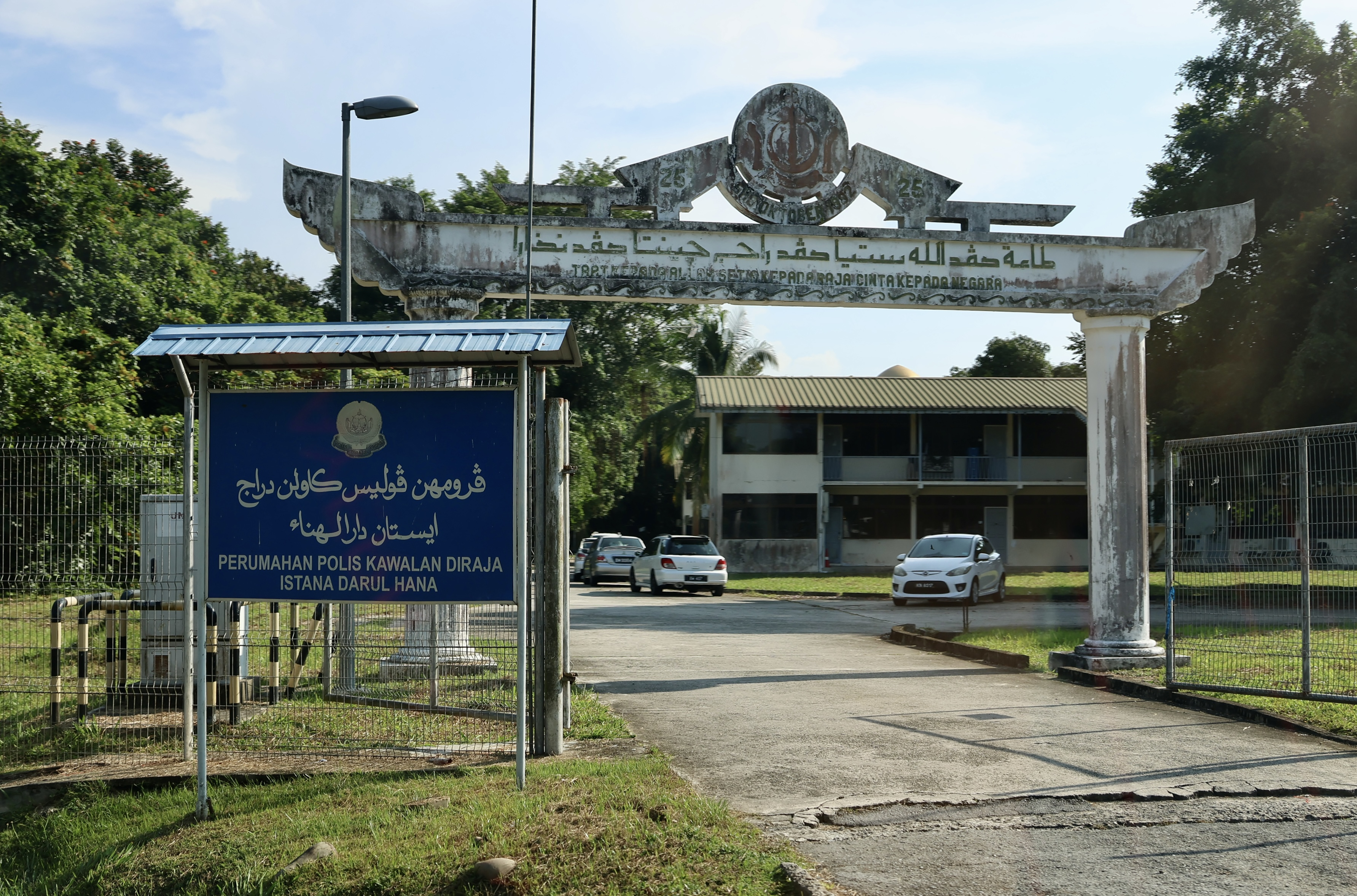
The palace's police housing

== See also ==
- Politics of Brunei
- Bandar Seri Begawan
- Istana Nurul Iman
