= Amy Mastura =

Malaysian singer and actress (born 1971)

- امي مستورة
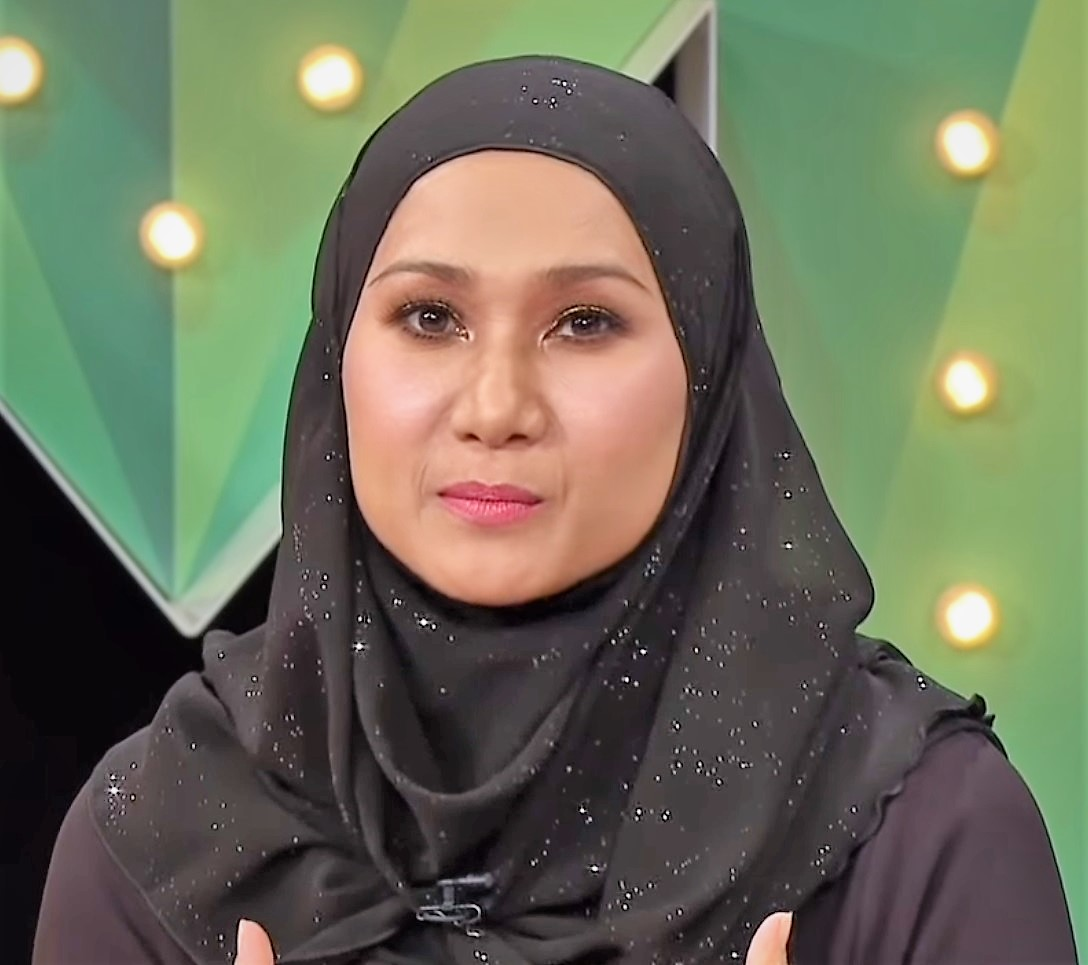
- Mastura on MeleTOP in June 2015.
- Born: Amy Mastura binti Suhaimi; May 10, 1971 (age 54); Batu Gajah, Perak, Malaysia
- Occupations: Singer, actress, comedian, television host, product endorser, composer, record producer
- Years active: 1993–present
- Spouse: Alvin Tham Suffian (m. 2000)
- Children: 2
- Relatives: Mazuin Hamzah (cousin); Nazmi Faiz (nephew)
- Musical career
- Genres: Pop, R&B, balada, pop rock, jazz, alternative pop
- Instruments: Vocal
- Labels: Pony Canyon (1993–1999); Amy Mastura Entertainment (1999–present); Sony Music (2000–2010)

Amy Mastura Suhaimi (born 10 May 1971) is a Malaysian singer and actress.

Her music career began in 1993 when she first gained recognition as a runner-up in the talent competition show Asia Bagus in Japan. She signed with Pony Canyon and released her self-titled debut studio album (1994), supported by the single "Meniti Hari", and she won the 1995 Penyanyi Wanita Popular (Popular Female Artiste) award. Her first two albums (Amy Mastura and Pujaanku), both of which were certified Double Platinum, and her third album Puteri, which was certified Platinum. Mastura also performed a duet with American pop singer Tommy Page, titled "The Best Part". Her single, "Bintang Hati" from her 2000 third studio album of the same name, garnered her another award, this time as the Best Pop Rock Song in 2000 Anugerah Juara Lagu awards.

Mastura first ventured into the film industry in 1994 with the film Kuala Lumpur Universiti few months before her debut album released, but she gained prominence in 1996's Tragedi Oktober, which was a local hit. She gained another hit the following year with Aziz M. Osman's Puteri Impian, a highly acclaimed romantic comedy for which she portrays Nora Mat Jidin, a factory girl who likes to dream and then later to join the reality TV to pursue her dream to be a princess. Through the film, she has won the best actress award at the Malaysia Film Festival in 1999. She then once again nominated for best actress for her dual-role comedic performance as well as receive another nomination for best original story for her works with Aziz in Bintang Hati (2004). Later in her acting career, she actively appears in local television dramas playing both comedy and dramatic roles.

In early March 2011, Mastura became the new ambassador for Kose, a Japanese cosmetic line. She became the first Malay woman to be the ambassador for Kose. Throughout her career as a performer, Amy Mastura has recorded and produced seven studio albums, three compilation albums and recorded 93 songs and singles, her album sales reached 5 million units.

== Early life ==
Amy Mastura was born on 10 May 1971 in Batu Gajah, Perak. She is the youngest of two siblings. She has an older brother. Her mother, Che Pora Din has portrayed as Nora's aunt in Puteri Impian 2 while her father, Suhaimi Mohamed Ramli is a retired soldier. Mastura and her older brother were raised in Ipoh. While in Ipoh she attended SMK Main Convent for her secondary education. Her cousins, Mazuin Hamzah and Mazlan Hamzah entered showbiz first and are members of Malaysian band, Quinary M which was popular in the 1980s. Her career was managed by her cousin, Nana since with Sony Music Malaysia.

== Career ==
Prior to her music career, Amy Mastura used to work as a stewardess for Malaysia Airlines (MAS), where she spent there for 5 years, from 1989 to 1994. She has family ties with Mazuin Hamzah as cousin, thus, musical career is synonymous with her. Mastura joined the music career via Asia Bagus competition in Japan and as a result, she won the competition and defeating other Asian new talents. She signed with the Japanese record label Pony Canyon where she was their recording artiste until 1999.

She was first introduced through a song titled, "Harapan Semalam", a duet song with composer Azmeer. Her self-titled debut album was released in 1994, a year after she won the Asia Bagus, notable singles from the album are "Meniti Hari", "Jawapan Kasih" and "Kasih" became hits in the radio airwaves. Her first single, "Meniti Hari" entering the 10th Anugerah Juara Lagu. She won the Popular Female Singer category at the Anugerah Bintang Popular Berita Harian 1994 and defeating other singers such as Fauziah Latiff and Shima. She also nominated in Best New Female Artist and Best Female Vocal Performance at the Anugerah Industri Muzik 1995. She left Malaysia Airlines in the end of 1994 to focus on her musical career.

She collaborated with the American singer and songwriter, Tommy Page through a song titled, "The Best Part". She was also a VJ on MTV Syok produced by MTV in 1995. On 14 May 1996, her second album Pujaan Ku was released and later followed by her third album, Puteri, on 1 November 1997.

Besides music, she was also a sought-after actress when she appeared in her first film, Kuala Lumpur Universiti with Azhar Sulaiman, the film was not released until 1999. This was followed by her second movie, Impian and later followed by her other films including Tragedi Oktober and Puteri Impian. The film eventually earned a win for Mastura in the Best Actress category at the 1999 Malaysian Film Festival. She also acted in several dramas and telemovies and active in theatrical works.

Her success in acting career has opened the public eye when she worked under the guidance from film director Aziz M. Osman. Both Puteri Impian films gained the box office in Malaysian film industry and earned Amy the Most Popular Film Actress in ABPBH 1999. During the 14th Malaysian Film Festival, she won Best Actress and defeated other actress such as Vanida Imran, Nasha Aziz and Normah Damanhuri. She is the only Best Female Vocal Performance finalist at the AIM to win the FFM's Best Actress.

In 2000, Amy joined Sony Music after her contract with Pony Canyon ended in 1999. Her fourth album, Bintang Hati was released and this was her first album with Sony Music. Three singles from the album, Bintang Hati, Sha Na Na and Siapalah Aku became hits and achieved in local radio charts. At the end of 2000, Mastura began her theatrical debut, entitled Siti Di Alam Fantasi at the Istana Budaya.

In 2001, she appeared in Toll Gate Girl directed by Osman Ali where she played as Markonah, together with actress Rita Rudaini and her co-star, Rashid Salleh and gained positive feedback from fans who had been waiting for her movie appearance. Her fifth album, Akan Datang was released a year later, Mastura remains popular as a singer even after becoming a wife and mother. The album won the Best Album Cover and the Kasih Suci music video won the AIM 2002. She also appeared in Cinta 3 Musim jointly produced by her own company, Amy Mastura Entertainment and Aziz M. Osman's Ace Motion Pictures where the drama VCD was released via three stages in 2003. Her husband also appeared as a supporting cast. In 2004, Mastura appeared in two films directed by Aziz, a musical film titled Bintang Hati where she portrayed two characters, Syakila (a popular singer) and Tasha (Syakila's manager); and the other one is a suspense thriller film, titled Trauma where she played as Nurul.

In 2005, Amy Mastura released her sixth album, Lebih Baik, however, the album received a negative feedback when its first single, Bukakanlah Pintu failed to reach listeners' attention. Notable singles include Bingung, Kasihku Sinar and Cinta. She also appeared in a comedy series, Puteri starring Nora Danish. Later on, Mastura appeared in several dramas such as Kasut Tumit Tinggi. In 2007, she hosted a lifestyle program, Casa Impian which formerly aired on Astro Ria and moved to TV3.

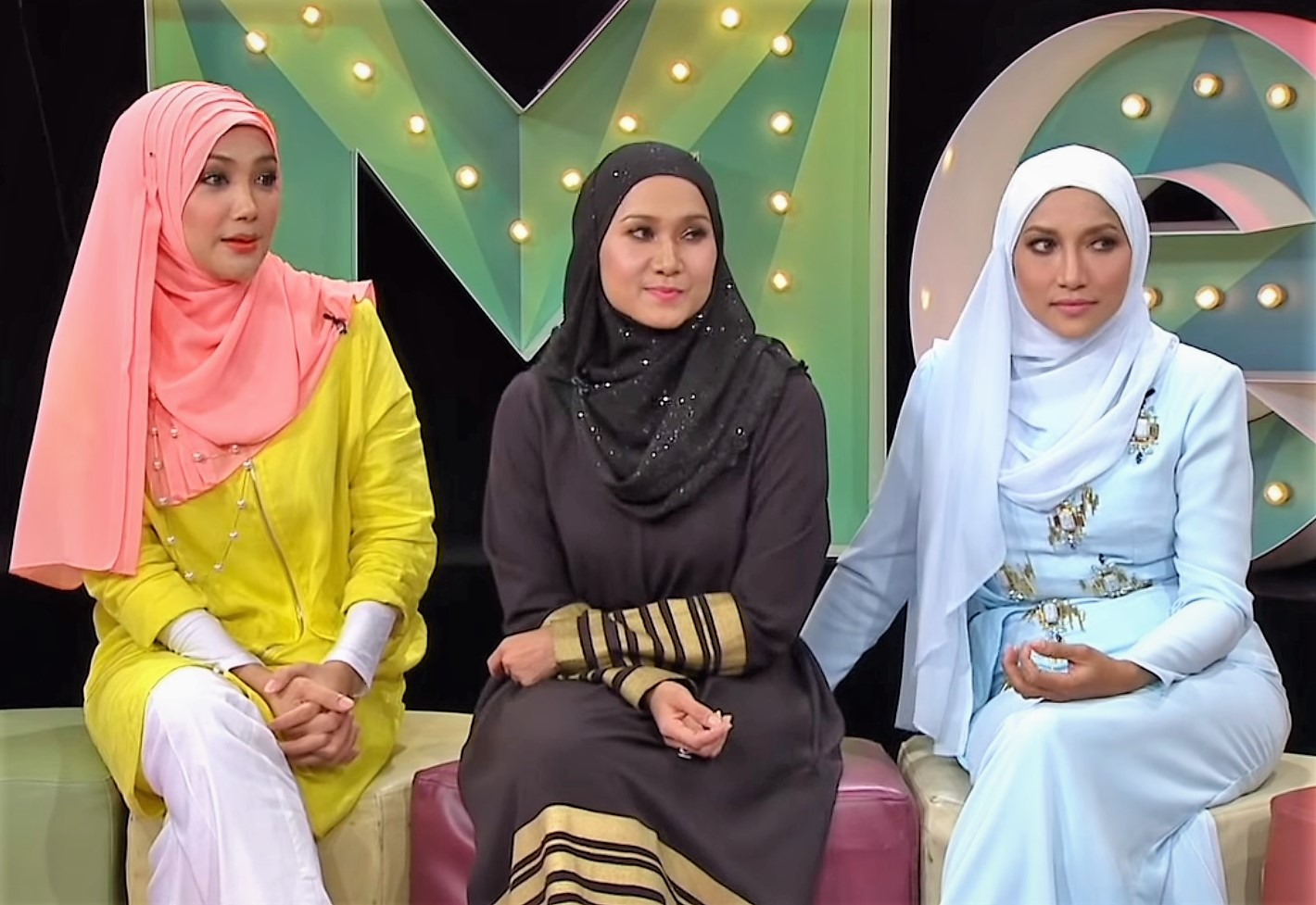
ltr:Malaysian singers and actresses Erra Fazira, Amy Mastura and Ziana Zain on MeleTOP in 2015

Her seventh album, Happy was released in 2009 but failed to highlight her as a singer as she is more prominent in acting career. She appeared in three films in 2010, Damping Malam, Hooperz and Aku Tak Bodoh.

After appearing in Siti Di Alam Fantasi, she appeared in her second theatrical works entitled, Gamat which also starred her daughter, Adalia. A year later, she became the ambassador of the Japanese cosmetical brand, Kose and made her the first Malay woman to become the spokesperson for the brand.

Between 2012 and 2015, she released two new singles, Tapi Itu Dulu and Jom Menari... Lerr from her upcoming album to be released soon. In June 2015, she decided to wear a hijab. In 2016, Amy Mastura released her new single, "Kalimah", it was her last recording before retired from her singing career after exactly 24 years.

In 2017, Amy will be starring in a drama called Jejak Karmila. The drama will be aired on TV3. On 7 September, Amy alongside 15 others celebrities will participate in Super Spontan Superstar 2017 which is a reality comedy shows on Astro Warna. She made it in top 8 with Shuib Sepahtu thus eliminated her in semi-finals.

== Other ventures ==
Besides singing and acting, Mastura also played her role as the product endorser and spokesperson where she has become the endorser for several products such as Quaker Oat, Omega watch, Cif, Maggi Cukup Rasa and other products.

== Personal life ==
Throughout her career, Amy Mastura has maintained a reputation for professionalism in her work.

She married her longtime friend who is also an oil rig engineer, Alvin Tham Suffian on 1 July 2000 and they have two daughters, Adriana and Adalia. Their marriage was held in Ipoh, Perak and dubbed as the "Wedding of the Year". She also has family ties with international football player, Nazmi Faiz.

== Discography ==
Studio albums

- Amy Mastura (1994)
- Pujaanku (1996)
- Puteri (1997)
- Bintang Hati (2000)
- Akan Datang (2002)
- Lebih Baik (2005)
- Happy (2009)

== Filmography ==
=== Film ===
Year	Title	Role	Notes
1996	Impian	Yazmin	
1996	Tragedi Oktober	Farah	
1997	Puteri Impian	Nora Mat Jidin	
1998	Puteri Impian 2	Nora Mat Jidin	
1999	KLU	Maria	
2000	Senario Lagi	Police Officer	Cameo appearance
2004	Trauma	Nurul	
2004	Bintang Hati	Shakilla/Tasha	
2010	Hooperz	Coach Q	
2010	Aku Tak Bodoh	Aishah	
2010	Damping Malam	Ku Khalira	
2012	Shh... Dia Datang	Marina / Safea	Completed
2017	Mendidih Bro		
2020	Keluarga Iskandar The Movie	Anisah Ismail	

=== Telemovie ===
Year	Title	Role	TV channel
2001	Toll Gate Girl	Markonah	NTV7
2007	Ice Cappucino Macchiato		
2008	Siapa Boss?		
2009	Gegar Gitu Raya		Astro Ria
2009	Ceritera		
2010	Hikayat		
2011	Penanggal	Cik Suri / Penanggal	Astro Ria
2011	Hantu Susu	Cik Suri / Penanggal	Astro Ria
2012	Hantu Susu Kembali	Cik Suri / Penanggal	Astro Ria
2012	Kami Janji Kami Berzanji	Sumarni	Astro Ria
2013	Kasanova Terdesak	Farisya	Astro Prima
2014	Hati Untuk Siapa	Nasha	Astro Prima
2015	Perangkap Perkahwinan	Mama	Astro Ria
2015	Mimi Tapau	Cik Lana	TV3
2015	Suamiku Seorang Vampire		
2017	Restu Ramadan	Mak Ram	TV3
2018	Super Menantu	Sara Sofian	NTV7
2021	My Future Husband	Dato’ Maznah	Astro Citra

=== Television series ===
Year	Title	Role	TV channel	Notes
1996	Sambal	Lijah	TV3	
1996	Cinta Korporat		TV3	
2000	Spanar Jaya		NTV7	Episode: "Gong Xi"
2005–2007	Puteri	Kak Mas	TV3	
2009	Kasut Tumit Tinggi		Astro Prima	
2012	Dalam Hati Ada Taman		Astro Ria	
2013	Nur Melinda		Astro Prima	
2014	Maaf Jika Ku Tak Sempurna	Datin Maziah	TV3	
2015	Dee		Astro Ceria	
2017	Jejak Karmila	Syarifah Aniza	TV3	
2017	Budak Ijat	Fatimah	TV3	
2017	Mencintaimu Mr. Photographer	Datin Laila	Astro Ria	
2018	Budak Usin	Fatimah	TV3	
2019	Mimpi Sabrina	Kak Sue	TV3	
2020–2021	Hadiah Dari Tuhan	Jannah	TV3	
2021	Checklist Mr. Right	Sofea	TV3	
2022	Khilaf Asmara	Wan Sue	TV3	

=== Theatre ===
Year	Title	Role
2000	Siti Di Alam Fantasi	Siti
2008	Selamat Hari Raya Perantau	
2009	Muzikal Gamat	
2010	Muzikal Gamat 2	
2013	Nyonya & The Gang	Keponakan Anggun
2015	Diari Wanita	
2015	Zombie La La La	Happy Witch

=== Television ===
Year	Title	Role	TV channel
2022	The Masked Singer Malaysia (season 2)	Jury	Astro Warna

== Videography ==
- Hanya Untukmu (1996)
- Amy Mastura Video Hits (2000)
- Bintang Karaoke : Amy Mastura (2002)
- Amy Mastura MTV Karaoke (2004)
- Keunggulan Amy Mastura VCD Karaoke (2005)

== Concerts ==
- Amy Mastura Live in Concert 2000 @ Life Centre (2000)

== Television hosting ==
=== TV Programs ===
- MTV Syok @ MTV Channel (Asia) (1995–1997)
- Casa Impian (Season 7) @ TV3 (2007)
- Kraft Single With Kids @ ntv7 (2008)
- Apa-Apa Aje Musim Kelima @ TV3 (2009)

=== Awards ===
- Anugerah Juara Lagu 1994 @ TV3 (1994)
- Anugerah Skrin 1995 @ TV3 (1995)
- Anugerah Juara Lagu 2005 @ TV3 (2005)
- Anugerah Bintang Popular Berita Harian 2013 @ TV3 (2014)
- Anugerah Bintang Popular Berita Harian 2014 @ TV3 (2015)

== Awards and nominations ==
Amy Mastura awards and nominations
Awards and nominations
Award	Wins	Nominations
Anugerah Industri Muzik	1	6
Malaysian Film Festival	1	2
Anugerah Bintang Popular	2	6
Anugerah Juara Lagu	1	3

Totals (Note: Certain award groups do not simply award one winner. They acknowledge several different recipients, have runners-up, and have third place. Since this is a specific recognition and is different from losing an award, runner-up mentions are considered wins in this award tally. For simplification and to avoid errors, each award in this list has been presumed to have had a prior nomination.)
- Wins: 5
- Nominations: 17

=== Anugerah Industri Muzik ===
Year	Category	Nominated works	Album	Result
Anugerah Industri Muzik 1994	Best New Female Artiste	Artist: Amy Mastura	Amy Mastura	Nominated
Anugerah Industri Muzik 1994	Best Vocal Performance in the Song (Female)	Artist: Amy Mastura	Amy Mastura	Nominated
Anugerah Industri Muzik 1996	Best Album	Album: Pujaanku	Pujaanku	Nominated
Anugerah Industri Muzik 2000	Best Album Cover	Designer: KS Chow	Bintang Hati	Nominated
Anugerah Industri Muzik 2003	Best Album Cover	Designer: William Liew		Won
Anugerah Industri Muzik 2003	Best Music Video	Video Kasih Suci – Director: Paul Loosey		Nominated
Anugerah Industri Muzik 2005	Best Album Cover	Designer: William Liew	Lebih Baik	Nominated

=== Malaysia Film Festival ===
Year	Category	Film	Result
14th Malaysia Film Festival	Best Female Actress	Puteri Impian	Won
17th Malaysia Film Festival	Best Female Actress	Bintang Hati	Nominated
17th Malaysia Film Festival	Best Original Story	Bintang Hati	Nominated

=== Anugerah Bintang Popular Berita Harian ===
Year	Category	Result
Anugerah Bintang Popular 1994	Best Female Singer	Won
Anugerah Bintang Popular 1996	Best Female Singer	Nominated
Anugerah Bintang Popular 1996	Best Female Film Actress	Nominated
Anugerah Bintang Popular 1997/98	Best Female Film Actress	Nominated
Anugerah Bintang Popular 1998/99	Best Female Film Actress	Won
Anugerah Bintang Popular 2000	Best Female Singer	Nominated
Anugerah Bintang Popular 2000	Best Female Film Actress	Nominated
Anugerah Bintang Popular 2002	Best Female Singer	Nominated

=== Anugerah Juara Lagu ===
Year	Song	Album	Composer	Lyrics	Category	Result
Anugerah Juara Lagu 1995	Meniti Hari	Amy Mastura	Fauzi Marzuki	Amran Omar	Pop rock	Nominated
Anugerah Juara Lagu 2000	Bintang Hati	Bintang Hati	Goh Boon Hoe	Amran Omar	Pop rock	Won
Anugerah Juara Lagu 2000	Sha Na Na	Bintang Hati	Amy Mastura	Amy Mastura	Pop rock	Nominated
Anugerah Juara Lagu 2002			Iman Wan	Amran Omar	Pop rock	Nominated

=== Muzik-Muzik Semi-final ===
Year	Song	Album	Composer	Lyrics	Category	Result
Anugerah Juara Lagu 1995	Jawapan Kasih	Amy Mastura	Azmeer / Zira	Halim	Pop rock	Pending
Anugerah Juara Lagu 1996	Diam Diam Rindu	Pujaanku	Goh Boon Hoe	Seri Bayu	Pop rock	Pending
Anugerah Juara Lagu 2000	Dengarkanlah	Bintang Hati	Helen Yap	M. Nasir	Ballad	Pending
Anugerah Juara Lagu 2001	Siapalah Aku	Bintang Hati	Zul Mahat	Amran Omar	Ballad	Pending
