= Pujaanku =

Studio album by Amy Mastura
- Released: 14 May 1996
- Recorded: 1995–1996
- Studios: RMP Studio; Broadway Studio
- Genres: Pop, R&B
- Length: 44:15
- Label: Pony Canyon
- Producers: Goh Boon Hoe; Boon Tan

Amy Mastura chronology
Amy Mastura (1994)	Pujaanku (1996)	Puteri (1997)

Singles from Pujaanku
- 1. "Pujaanku" Released: 10 April 1996; 2. "Kasih Kita" Released: 23 June 1996; 3. "Kembalilah" Released: 16 September 1996

Pujaanku is a second studio album by Malaysian singer, Amy Mastura, released on 14 May 1996 by Pony Canyon.

== Production ==
Pujaanku was Amy Mastura's second solo album. It was produced after the massive success of her self-titled debut album. Songwriting was handled by Azlan Abu Hassan, Fauzi Marzuki, Goh Boon Hoe and Boon Tan with the latter two served as the album producer. For the album, Amy retain the 'cheerful' concept, with the lyrics in the album focused on general messages "without touching melodious poetic rhythm".

The album's cover art photography was taken by Malaysian photographer, H. Lin Ho. It features 10 different poses of Amy Mastura on the album sleeve.

== Release and reception ==
Originally scheduled for June 1996 release, Pujaanku was officially released a month earlier, on 14 May, just three days after what would have been her 25th birthday, with "Kasih Kita" and "Kembalilah" released as lead singles. "Diam-Diam Rindu" and "Pujaanku" were later released as further singles. The album was well received upon release, sold over 150,000 copies as of March 1997 and certified Platinum.

== Track listing ==
No.	Title	Writer(s)	Length
1.	"Kembalilah"	Younky S.	3:55
2.	"Kasih Kita"	Arie Satyawan, Dorie Kalmas	5:22
3.	"Bicara Hati"	Boon Tan, A. Nor	4:35
4.	"Pujaanku"	A. Haidi	4:56
5.	"Pintu Harapan"	Azlan Abu Hassan, Amran Omar	4:01
6.	"Diam Diam Rindu"	Goh Boon Hoe, Seri Bayu	4:32
7.	"Gemala"	Fauzi Marzuki, Arab	5:17
8.	"Nada Rindu"	Goh Boon Hoe, Amran Omar	4:39
9.	"Ku Syairkan Janji"	Fauzi Marzuki, Lennie Atikah	3:28
10.	"Mahkota Hatiku"	Boon Tan, Zainol	4:37
Total length:			44:15

== Personnel ==
Credits adapted from Pujaanku booklet liner notes.

- Amy Mastura – vocals, background vocals
- Goh Boon Hoe – producer
- Ujang – executive producer
- Boon Tan – producer, mixer, recorder
- Rahim – recorder
- Nor Azhar "Spit" Shaari – recorder
- Zaid Yusoff – recorder
- Moses "G-Soul" Chan – mixer
- Seigen Ono – mastering
- Kit Rushuhaimin – concept
- H. Lin Ho – photography

== Certifications ==
Region	Certification	Certified units/sales
Malaysia	Platinum	150,000

== Release history ==
Region	Release date	Format	Label
Malaysia	14 May 1996	CD, cassette, digital download	Pony Canyon
