= Asia Bagus =

Multinational talent show series

- Presented by: Najip Ali (1992-1995, 1996-1999); Tomoko Kadowaki (1992-1994); Moses Lim (1994); Sheikh Haikel and Ashidiq Ghazali (1996)
- Countries of origin: Singapore; Indonesia; Malaysia; Japan

Production
- Running time: 30 minutes

Original release
- Network: Japan - Fuji TV; Indonesia - TVRI/RCTI; Malaysia - TV3; Singapore - TCS Channel 5
- Release: April 1992 – 2000

Asia Bagus! was a star-search program created by Fuji Television spanning from 1992 until 2000 to promote young up-and-coming performing artists in Asia. The show broadcast once a week for 24 episodes from April to September throughout Indonesia, Singapore, Malaysia, Korea, Japan, Taiwan (from 1994) and Thailand.

The contestants featured in the program were twelve amateur singers between the age of 12 and 25, selected from 300 entries each month from the participating countries. Three singers from each country, selected from the auditions, were encouraged to sing in their native languages. The prevailing champion over three shows went on to compete in a monthly run-off, while grand championships were held once a year. The grand champion of each year will record a solo album while the winners for the monthly run-offs will record an album together.

Former hosts include Tomoko Kadowaki from Japan and Najip Ali from Singapore. Singaporean Moses Lim also once co-hosted Asia Bagus in 1994 while 1993 champion Construction Sight duos Sheikh Haikel and Ashidiq Ghazali became the hosts for 1996. Another Japanese woman was once a co-host of the show.

For the 1996 season, a new segment called Big Asia was added, where Najip Ali interviewed personalities from Asia.

== Etymology ==
The name Asia Bagus! was coined by a Malaysian marketing guru, Prof. Abdul Hamid Mohamed. The word "Bagus" in the title means "great".

Fuji Television, asked me what would be a good name for an Asian got talent show. I said Asia Bagus!. They bought the idea, and I became one of the judges.

— Prof. Abdul Hamid Mohamed

== The winners ==
Year	Moment	Place	The Winner	Runner up
1992	1st Grand Championship	Tokyo, Japan	Krisdayanti from Indonesia: Score 96 points, song "Learning form Love"	Dewi Yuliartiningsih (Dewi Gita) from Indonesia: Score 93 points, song "Merenda Kasih"
1993	2nd Grand Championship	Yoyogi National Stadium, Tokyo, Japan	Sheikh Haikel & Ashidiq Ghazali (Construction Sight) from Singapore: Score 90 points, song "Tequila"	Ninies Dian Ratnasari from Indonesia: Score 89 points, song "I Have Nothing"
1993	3rd Grand Championship	Tokyo, Japan	Amy Mastura from Malaysia: Score 87 points, song "Fikir Dulu"	Erva Yudhisa from Indonesia: Score 86 points, song "Save the Best for Last"
1994	4th Grand Championship	Tokyo, Japan	Nisa Lin from Taiwan: Score 83 points, (Won via voting)	Prilianty Chintya Lamusu from Indonesia: Score 83 points, song "I Know Him So Well"; Tang Lai Ngor from Malaysia: Score 83 points
1995	5th Grand Championship	Jakarta, Indonesia	Tengku Shaharum from Malaysia: Score 89 points, song "Now and Forever" (won via voting)	Imelda Raggilia from Indonesia: Score 89 points, song "Gairah Jiwa"
1996	6th Grand Championship	Kuala Lumpur, Malaysia	Miki Low Leang Cheng from Malaysia: Score 90 points, song "Pasti" (won via voting)	Eka Mairina from Indonesia: Score 90 points; Akiyo Hoshino from Japan: Score 90 points
1997	Best Of Asia Bagus	Tokyo, Japan	Krisdayanti from Indonesia: song "Merasa"	-
1998	7th Grand Championship	Jakarta, Indonesia	Ida Satrianti (Atiek) from Indonesia: Score 92 points, song "Be the Man" (won via voting)	Ikema Akane from Japan: Score 92 points
1999	8th Grand Championship	Bali, Indonesia	Rio Febrian from Indonesia: Score 94 points, song "I am your Angel"	Alyah from Malaysia: Score 89 points (won via voting)
2000	9th Grand Championship	Kuala Lumpur, Malaysia	Caroline Gunawan (Alena) from Indonesia: Score 93 points, song "What a girl want"	Gail Satiawaki from Indonesia: Score 89 points, song "This things called love" (won via voting); Jirayut Namkong from Thailand: Score 89 points
