= Boroline =

Indian antiseptic cream

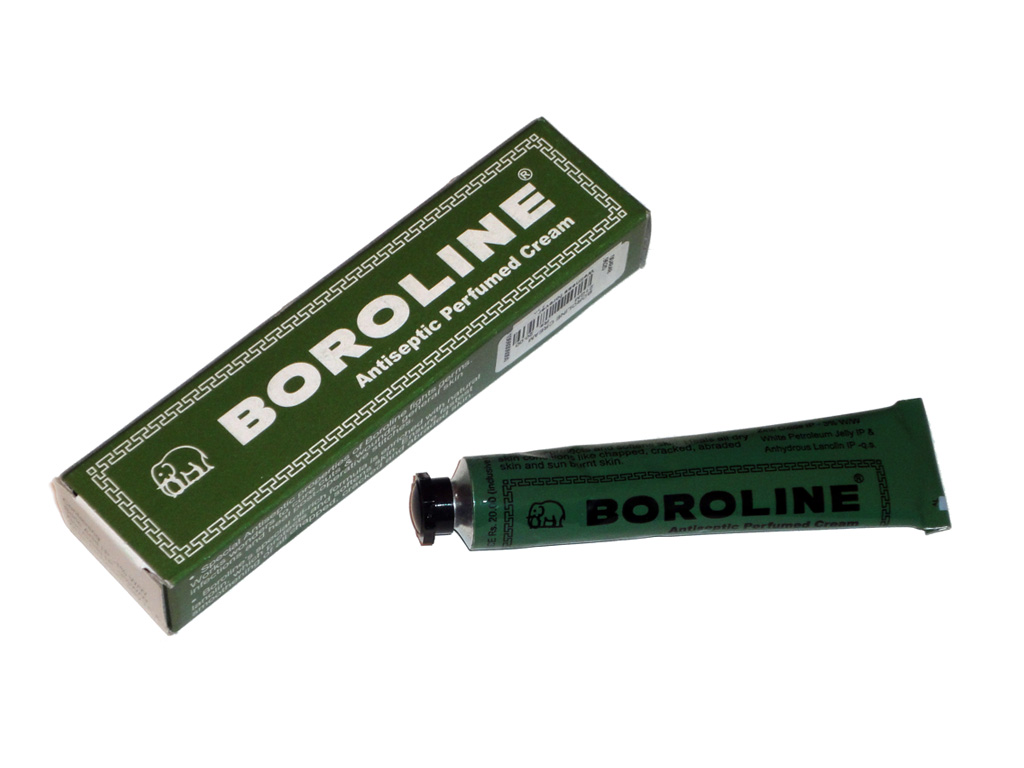
- Product type: Antiseptic
- Current owner: G.D. Pharmaceuticals Private Limited, Kolkata
- Country: India
- Introduced: 1929; 97 years ago
- Ambassadors: Raima Sen, Sakshi Tanwar, Vidya Balan
- Website: boroline.com

Boroline is an over-the-counter antiseptic cream sold in India by G. D. Pharmaceuticals. The cream is marketed as a natural and ayurvedic solution for various skin issues such as cuts, cracked lips, rough skin, and infections.

The product traces its origins to the Swadeshi movement prevalent in India in the 1920s. First produced in 1929 by Gour Mohan Dutta, the product gained popularity since it was one of the first antiseptic creams to be made in India. Dutta strategically marketed Boroline as a reflection of Bengali culture, tapping into nationalistic sentiments. The packaging of the cream in green tubes featuring an elephant logo allowed it to be easily identified by consumers, especially those in rural areas. Post-independence, the company faced competition but adapted through branding and marketing efforts, including event sponsorship. Despite challenges such as production halts, Boroline is still in circulation as of 2024, and the brand accounted for over 60% of the parent company's revenue in 2016. It maintains a significant presence in Bengali culture and is known to evoke a sense of nostalgia amongst members of the community.

== History ==
The history of Boroline traces back to the 1920s in India, during the height of the Swadeshi movement, which advocated for self-sufficiency and reduced reliance on British imports. Gour Mohan Dutta, a Bengali merchant who dealt in imported cosmetics, embraced the Swadeshi movement to create locally made alternatives with the assistance of his wife. One of his concoctions, an antiseptic cream made from a blend of boric acid and oil, garnered significant attention and quickly sold out in the Burrabazar markets where he sold his products. Recognizing the potential of his formulation, Dutta officially founded G. D. Pharmaceuticals in 1929 and named the product Boroline. The name is derived from boro (short for boric acid) and -oline from the Latin oleum (transl. 'oil'). Marketed in distinctive green tubes adorned with an elephant logo, symbolizing strength, prosperity and inspired by the Hindu deity Ganesha, Boroline swiftly gained popularity among Indian consumers, becoming a staple in households across Bengal and rest of India.

== Marketing ==
Boroline advertisement in 1962

Early on, Dutta positioned Boroline as a product that was integral to Bengali culture. He only ran ads for the product in the Bengali language and targeted major Bengali events like Durga Puja. As a result, the product became associated with the nationalistic sentiments prevalent during the time. During the early 1920s, it was considered a matter of pride to be using the locally made Boroline over other similar foreign creams. In 1947, during the Independence Day celebrations, G. D. Pharmaceuticals ran an ad in national newspapers that distributed coupons for free tubes of Boroline. Over 100,000 tubes of the antiseptic cream were reported to have been distributed as part of the promotion.

After India's independence, the product experienced significant competition from homegrown counterfeits and knockoff products. Indian multinational conglomerate Emami released a product called BoroPlus that was endorsed by the actor Amitabh Bachchan and his wife Jaya Bachchan (née Bhaduri). In response, G. D. Pharmaceuticals invested heavily in advertising. During the same time company also aggressively altered their branding to keep up with the times. A focus was made on establishing Boroline as the "original" antiseptic cream in India. An ad agency was contracted to write a jingle for the advertisement of Boroline across both West Bengal and India. The resulting jingle, written by Rituparno Ghosh, was the "Bongo jiboner ongo" (বঙ্গ জীবনের অঙ্গ), which implied that the cream was an integral part of Bengali life.

Since the 1950's, the company was run by the founder's son Murari Mohan Dutta. Dutta poineered the idea of sponsoring sporting events and festivals in India. In 1982, Boroline became one of the first sponsors for the Jawaharlal Nehru International Football Gold Cup (which went on to become the Nehru Cup), one of the first events to be broadcast in colour across India. The company became a permanent fixture in sporting events and festivals, cheering on players and organizing campaigns on the streets during festivals. As a result of these marketing efforts, Boroline's sales doubled and the brand gained a significant amount of recognition and brand loyalty. Even in rural areas, where most people were unable to read the advertisements, the cream was known as a haatiwala cream (transl. cream with the elephant) due to the company's iconic packaging and elephant logo.

== Product ==
Boroline is a combination of the antiseptic boric acid, the astringent and sunscreen zinc oxide, and the emollient lanolin, and is marketed by G. D. Pharmaceuticals as a natural and ayurvedic solution for various skin issues such as cuts, cracked lips, rough skin, and infections. Despite a temporary production halt in the 1990s due to government price regulations, Boroline continues to be available to consumers as of 2025 retaining its iconic green packaging. During World War II, the company temporarily transitioned to alternate packaging, however the company included a note in these containers reassuring customers on each package that despite the change, the quality and quantity of ingredients remained consistent.

The company operates two manufacturing facilities in Chakbagi, West Bengal, and the Mohan Nagar Industrial Area, Ghaziabad, responsible for producing Boroline. In 2016, Boroline contributed to over 60% of its sales of the company. In 2021, the company recorded over $31.7 million in sales and $10.1 million in profits.

== In popular culture ==
Boroline is considered a staple of Bengali culture. The product has been used by multiple generations of people in the Bengali community, leading to an inside joke claiming that Boroline can cure almost anything. In 2016, Sawan Dutta published a vlog titled an "Ode to Boroline" where she sung about the various ways in which Bengalis use the cream. Many of the commercials and associated products sold by G. D. Pharmaceuticals have been said to evoke a sense of nostalgia amongst members of the community.
