= Kaun Banega Crorepati =

Indian game show

- Based on: Who Wants to Be a Millionaire? by: David Briggs; Steven Knight; Mike Whitehill
- Directed by: Arun Sheshkumar
- Presented by: Amitabh Bachchan (season 1–2, 4–present); Shah Rukh Khan (season 3)
- Music by: Keith Strachan and Matthew Strachan (starting on season 1); Ramon Covalo and Nick Magnus (starting on season 4); Sawan Dutta (starting on season 5); Ajay-Atul (starting on season 11); Rohan-Vinayak (starting on season 15); Amitabh Bachchan (starting on season 15)
- Country of origin: India
- Original language: Hindi
- No. of seasons: 18
- No. of episodes: 1,549

Production
- Running time: 38–96 minutes
- Production companies: BIG Synergy (seasons 1–10); Studio NEXT (seasons 10–17) (Note: Co-produced season 10 uncredited, credited since 11.); Tree of Knowledge (Digi TOK) (seasons 11–16) (Note: Co-producing uncredited since season 1; as a consulting producer only, credited since season 11.); S Cube Studios (Present)

Original release
- Network: Star Plus (seasons 1–3); Sony Entertainment Television (seasons 4–present)
- Release: 3 July 2000 – present

Kaun Banega Crorepati (transl. Who Will Become a Millionaire), or simply KBC, is an Indian Hindi-language television game show. It is the official Hindi version of the British game show Who Wants to Be a Millionaire?. It is presented by actor Amitabh Bachchan, who has hosted the show for its entire run except for its third season, during which another actor, Shah Rukh Khan, replaced Bachchan. The programme aired on Star Plus for its first three seasons from 2000 to 2007, and was commissioned by the programming team of Sameer Nair. In 2010, it started airing on Sony Entertainment Television and was produced by BIG Synergy (under various names over periods of time) from season 1 till season 10. Afterwards, the credited production companies co-producing are Studio NEXT since season 10 and Tree of Knowledge (Digi TOK) since season 11 respectively.

The format is similar to other shows in the Who Wants to Be a Millionaire? franchise: contestants are asked multiple choice questions and must select the correct answer from four possible choices, and are provided with lifelines that may be used if they are uncertain. Starting in season 7 in 2013, the top prize was ₹7 crore and was increased to ₹7.5 crore in Season 14 in 2022 to celebrate 75 years of India's Independence.

== Season overview ==
Season	Episodes	Originally aired	
Season	Episodes	First aired	Last aired
1	315	3 July 2000	31 December 2001
2	61	5 August 2005	13 January 2006
3	53	22 January 2007	19 April 2007
4	36	11 October 2010	9 December 2010
5	56	15 August 2011	17 November 2011
6	58	7 September 2012	26 January 2013
7	39	6 September 2013	1 December 2013
8	50	18 August 2014	16 November 2014
9	52	28 August 2017	7 November 2017
10	61	3 September 2018	26 November 2018
11	75	19 August 2019	29 November 2019
12	85	28 September 2020	22 January 2021
13	85	23 August 2021	17 December 2021
14	106	7 August 2022	30 December 2022
15	100	14 August 2023	29 December 2023
16	152	12 August 2024	11 March 2025
17	105	11 August 2025	2 January 2026
18	60	10 August 2026	TBA

=== Season 1: 2000–2001 ===
KBC premiered on 3 July 2000 and was hosted by Amitabh Bachchan, his first appearance on Indian television & has subsequently hosted all the following seasons, except season three. KBC initially offered contestants the chance to win Rs. 1 crore. The declining ratings of KBC paved way for reformatting the series immediately as Junior KBC with kids as contestants which started airing from 6 May 2001. The season ended on 31 December 2001. The show was well received in its premiere season. It is the longest season of the show.

=== Season 2: 2005–2006 ===
On 5 August 2005, the show was restarted after a four-year hiatus, and renamed Kaun Banega Crorepati Dwitiya or KBC 2. During this season, the top prize amount was doubled to Rs. 2 crore. It was abruptly ended by STAR Plus after Amitabh Bachchan fell ill in 2006 after he shot his last episode on 13 January 2006. Bachchan had shot 61 of the 85 scheduled episodes when he fell ill. He announced he would return after he recovered, but when his health prevented him from filming the remaining 24 episodes, Star TV took the decision to stop production.

=== Season 3: 2007 ===
Star Television recruited Shah Rukh Khan to host the third season of the show when Bachchan declined. The grand prize remained Rs. 2 crore. The third season of the show began airing on 22 January 2007 with the first contestant as Prasenjit Sarkar who was the last contestant dropped from season two midway owing to Bachchan's health. The show started well but the show's ratings dropped significantly due to the change of the host. The season ended on 19 April 2007 with a special finale.

=== Season 4: 2010 ===
The show was restarted after a three-year and half hiatus. The fourth season (called Tez Theeka Tabarthor: Kaun Banega Crorepati or KBC 4) was hosted by the returning Amitabh Bachchan and started on 11 October 2010. This season was telecast four days a week, Monday through Thursday evenings. The tagline of the season was "Koi Bhi Sawaal Chota Nahi Hota" (transl. Every question is important; literally: No question is small). The show moved from STAR Plus to Sony TV. The new logo designed for the fourth season incorporated the new Indian Rupee symbol, which was unveiled earlier in the year. The contestant tryout for the fourth season opened on 2 August 2010 at 9 PM IST. The total prize money for this season was ₹1 crore, and a jackpot question for ₹5 crore. The fourth season of the show was highly successful due to the return of former host Amitabh Bachchan. The season ended on 9 December 2010.

During this season, much like its international counterparts, there were various rule changes made to the show. The number of questions was reduced from 15 to 13 and, as in the United States version of the show, a timer was added to each question. There was a 30-second time limit for questions 1 and 2, and a 45-second time limit for questions 3 to 7. Questions 8 to 13 were not timed. Any time not used was voided and not banked (unlike the United States version which banked the time for the final question). Much like other countries' version of the game, the clock stops whenever a lifeline is used and if the time limit expired, the contestant was forced to walk away with their current winnings. This season introduced the "Double Dip" and "Ask the Expert" lifelines (similar to the United States counterpart from the Millionaire clock format). Also from this season onwards, Fastest Finger First Contestants earlier who used to come for one episode has now been allowed to stay for one week.

==== Hot Seat ====
This Hot Seat version was started at the Diwali time from 1 to 4 November 2010. All contestants were celebrities on this version. This version was just like Millionaire Hot Seat. For questions 1–5, 30 seconds were available. For questions 6–10, 45 seconds were available. For questions 11–15, 60 seconds were available. It had only one lifeline, named Pass.

=== Season 5: 2011 ===
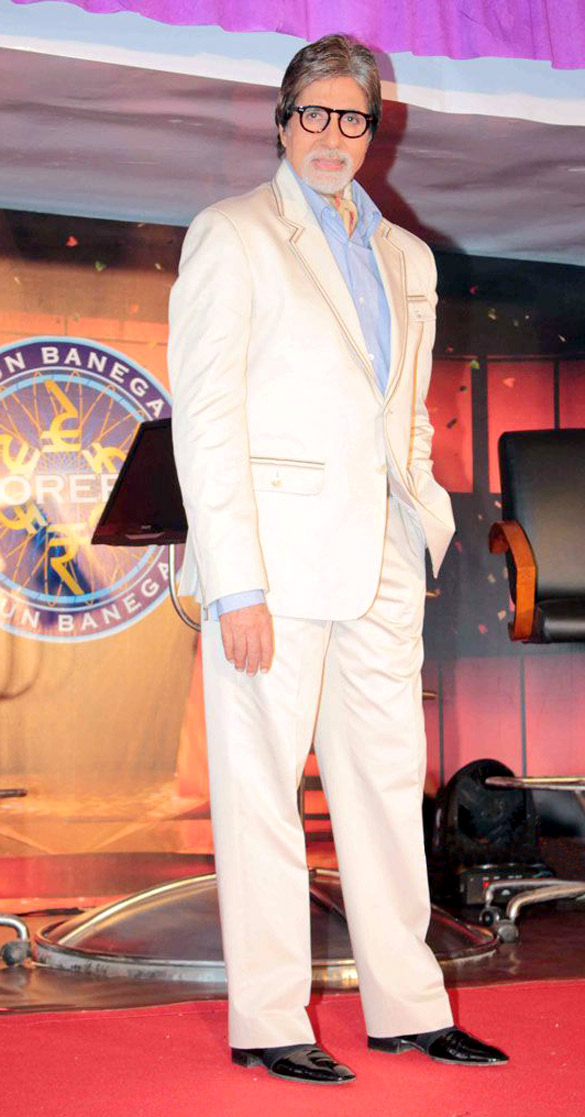
Amitabh Bachchan at KBC-5 Press Meet

Amitabh Bachchan returned to host the fifth season which premiered on 15 August 2011 on Indian Independence Day and ended on 17 November 2011. It was again aired four days a week. Compared to the previous season, there was only one major gameplay change: there was only a single milestone (the Padao) that the contestant chose. The tagline used for the season was "Koi Bhi Insaan Chota Nahi Hota" (transl. No human is small Literally: No person is inferior). This season was generally viewed as the most popular show on Indian television in 2011.

This season introduced a play at home segment called "Ghar Baithe Jeeto Jackpot". This contest allowed home viewers to send an answer to a question via SMS during the show, with 1 Lakh Rupees going to the randomly picked winner, who can double or triple this amount by correctly answering a jackpot question.

=== Season 6: 2012–2013 ===
The registration (contestant tryout) for the season started on 28 May 2012. This sixth season (labeled as KBC 6) was also hosted by Amitabh Bachchan and premiered on 7 September 2012. It aired from Friday to Sunday evenings on Sony TV. The season ended on 26 January 2013. The tagline used for the season was "Sirf Gyaan Hi Aapko Aapka Haq Dilata Hai" (It is only knowledge that gives you your right). This season retained the 13 question format of the previous season.

This season, KBC started a new tradition of giving an advantage to socially excluded people, known as "Dusra Mauka" (Second Chance). Sonali Mukherjee, a victim of acid throwing, appeared along Lara Dutta in the first such special. On 13 January 2013, another special aired in which Manoj Kumar, a Mahadalit was accompanied by Indian actor Manoj Bajpayee. The winner of season 6 was Sunmeet Kaur.

=== Season 7: 2013 ===
Rehearsals for the show began on 26 June 2013. Registration started from 8:30 p.m. on 27 May 2013.

The seventh season (called KBC 7) was also hosted by Bachchan entitled "Seekhna Bandh Toh Jeetna Bandh" (transl. If Learning stops, winning stops or simply: Learn to Win) was used as the tagline for the season. The total prize money was increased to ₹7 crore, and the number of questions increased from 13 to 15. The season was commenced on 6 September 2013.

The season had a few changes, including a new lifeline called Power Paplu. This lifeline allowed the contestant to reuse a lifeline that was already used on a previous question (but not one that was used by the contestant in attempting to answer the current question). Double Dip and Ask the Expert were discontinued while 50:50 and Flip the Question (also known as "Switch" or "Switch the Question") were revived. The Phone-a-Friend was extended to 45 seconds. The prize for the jackpot question was increased to ₹7 crore. The Kaun Banega Crorepati 2013 set was a 360-degree multimedia stage. The final four questions were a part of Sapta Koti Sandook (transl. The Seven Crore Jackpot). The system of Fastest Finger First was also altered. Instead of playing one question, the winner of the leader board formed at the end of three questions sits on the Hot Seat. (i.e. the player who answered the most questions correctly in the shortest amount of time).

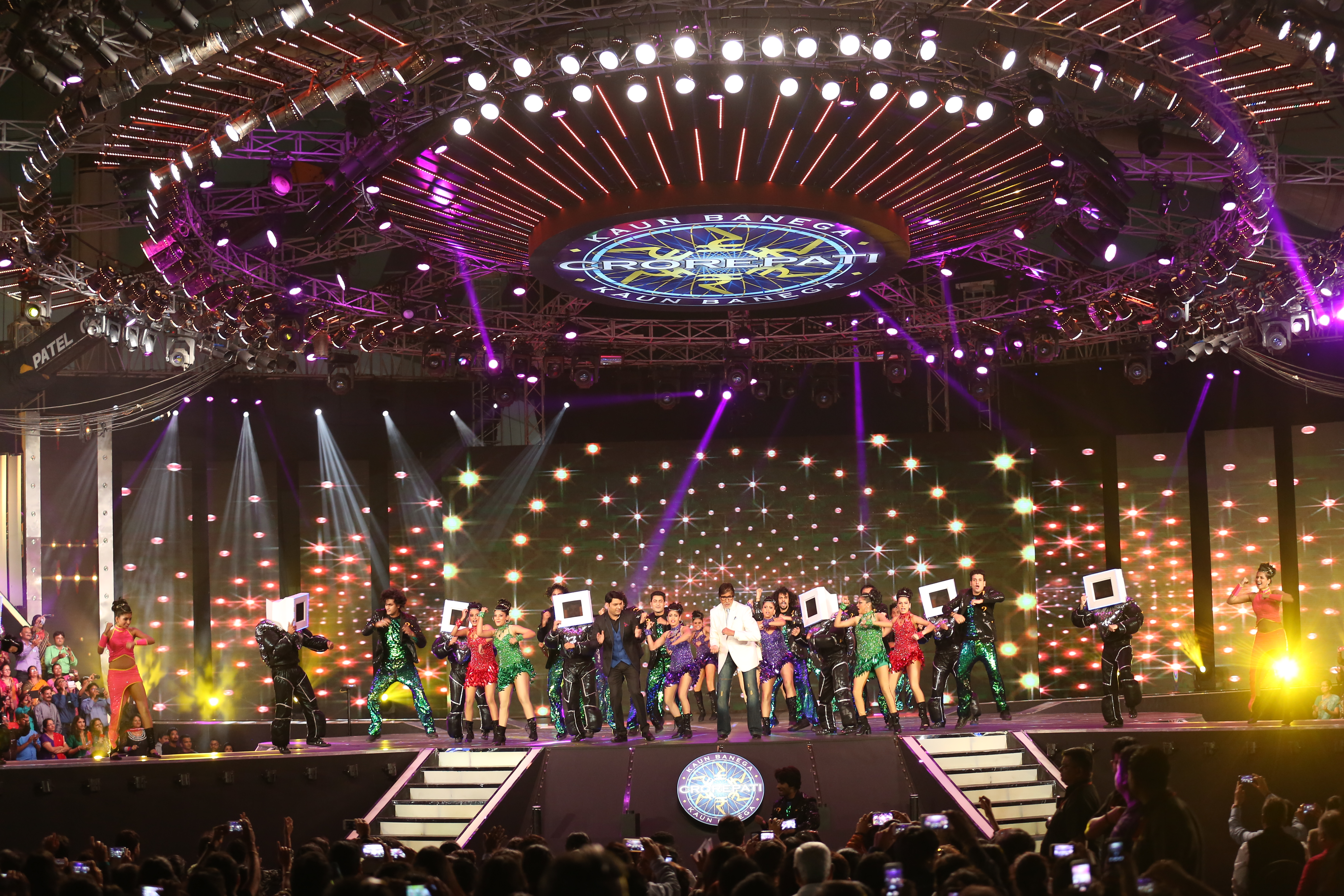
The Surat International Exhibition and Convention Centre (SIECC) in 2014

=== Season 8: 2014 ===
The highest winning prize of this season was also ₹7 crore. The registrations of KBC 8 were commenced on 22 July 2014 and the shooting started on 2 August 2014. Shooting of some episodes was held in Raipur and other in Gujarat, Surat at The Surat International Exhibition and Convention Centre (SIECC) in Sarsana, photography was done by Ashvin Borad. This was the first time that KBC was shot outside Mumbai. The format underwent minor changes for the season, with the number of questions reduced to 14, the Double Dip replacing the 50:50, as well as the Flip being replaced by the Triguni (Three Wise Men) lifeline. The Phone-a-Friend was shortened down to 30 seconds and the original Fastest Finger First system (as used for seasons 1 to 6) was reinstated.

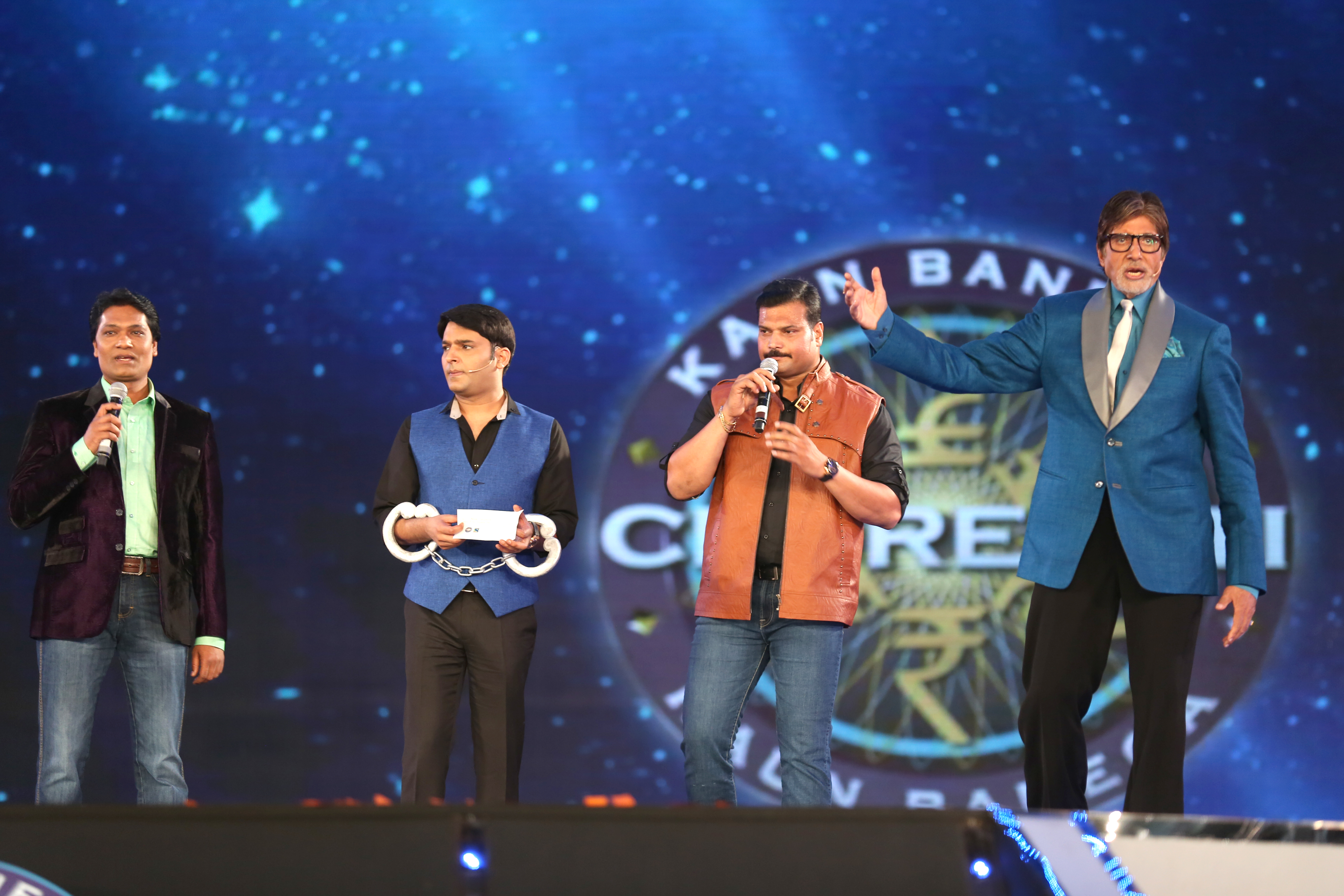
The Surat International Exhibition and Convention Centre (SIECC) in 2014 on stage (from L-R) Aditya Srivastava, Kapil Sharma, Dayanand Shetty and Amitabh Bachchan photography was done by Ashvin Borad-Surat

The grand premiere episode of the series premiered on 17 August 2014 (Sunday) at 8:30 PM IST for 3 hours. The season aired from Monday through Thursday evenings. Initially running for 1.5 hours, the program reduced to an hour. The season ended on 6 November 2014 and aired its two grand finale episodes on 9 November and on 16 November 2014. The tagline for the season was "Yahan Sirf Paise Nahi, Dil Bhi Jeete Jate Hain" (transl. Not only money here, but hearts are also won). Special guests appeared in the grand premiere episode: television comedian, Kapil Sharma from Colors TV's television series Comedy Nights with Kapil; Shivaji Satam, Dayanand Shetty and Aditya Shrivastava from Sony TV's television series CID; and finally Rajput hero, Maharana Pratap a.k.a. Faisal Khan from Sony TV's television series Bharat Ka Veer Putra – Maharana Pratap gave a stellar dance performance. Among others the Shillong Chamber Choir led by Neil Nongkynrih performed a medley of evergreen songs of Bollywood followed by a patriotic song at the opening ceremony of KBC8.

=== Season 9: 2017 ===
After a gap of 2 years, KBC returned to the air with Bachchan resuming hosting duties as it premiered on 28 August 2017 airing on Sony TV. The tagline of this season was "Jawaab dene ka Waqt aa Gaya Hai" (transl. The time has come to answer). The show aired from Monday to Friday at 9:00 pm and the Friday episode has been titled as Nayi Chaah Nayi Raah . The season introduced a 16 question format, where the first 10 questions are timed (45 seconds for the first five questions and 60 seconds for the following five questions). The 50:50 lifeline was restored replaced Double Dip and the Three Wise Men lifeline was replaced by the Plus One (from the United States version). Phone-a-Friend (now sponsored by Jio) introduced video calls. In case the contestant reaches the 16th question (Jio Jackpot Question), then the contestant cannot use the remaining lifelines. The last episode of the show was aired on 7 November 2017 titled as Abhinandan Aabhar.

=== Season 10: 2018 ===
The show started registration on 6 June 2018 and started airing on Sony TV from 3 September 2018. The tagline for the tenth season is Kab Tak Rokoge (transl. How long will you stop). In this particular season, the Phone-a-friend lifeline was replaced with the Ask The Expert lifeline.

=== Season 11: 2019 ===
Season 11 of KBC premiered on Sony TV on 19 August 2019, with Bachchan resuming hosting duties for the tenth time. The show aired on weeknights from 9:00 p.m. to 10:30 pm IST, with Karamveer Special episodes airing every Friday until 11 p.m. IST. The show's tagline for the season was "Ade Raho" (lit. "keep standing"). In this season, the Plus One lifeline was replaced by Switch, with optional categories for the switched question. The final episode of the season aired on 29 November 2019, which featured Sudha Murthy as the Karamveer Special contestant.

=== Season 12: 2020–2021 ===
On 2 May 2020, Sony TV released a short video via social media featuring Bachchan, stating that the audition process for season 12 will run from 9 to 23 May.

Due to the COVID-19 pandemic, filming and airing was delayed. Filming began on 7 September. Bachchan posted the first look of the updated set on his official Twitter handle. Season 12 premiere was aired on 28 September, with the tagline "jo bhi ho, har setback ka jawab comeback se do" (जो भी हो, हर सेटबेक का जवाब कमबेक से दो).

Because of the COVID-19 pandemic, filming occurred without a studio audience. Consequently, the Audience Poll lifeline was replaced by the Video a Friend lifeline, which is similar to the Phone a Friend lifeline, except via video call.

For the first time in KBC history, a contestant (Runa Saha from Kolkata) came to the hot seat without playing Fastest Finger First, as there were no other contestants left.

On 11 November, Nazia Nasim became the season's first ₹1 crore winner. The final episode of the season aired on 22 January 2021.

=== Season 13: 2021 ===
Registration for season 13 began on 10 May 2021. The format of digital auditions was continued, and the entire process was divided into four parts: registration, screening, online auditions, and personal interviews. The show's promos were titled Sammaan and were directed by Nitesh Tiwari. They were released in three parts with the last part revealing the show's air date and time.

The show premiered on 23 August on Sony TV and the SonyLIV app. The Friday special episode was titled Shaandaar Shukravaar. The studio audience returned for this season; consequently, the audience poll lifeline was reinstated. However, the Fastest Finger First was removed and the Triple Test was introduced, in which contestants took three general knowledge questions with four options similar to the season 7 version, and the contestant answering all three in the shortest time headed to the hot seat.

On 31 August, Himani Bundela became the season's first ₹1 crore winner and the first ever blind contestant to win a crore. On 21 October, Sahil Aditya Ahirwar became the season's second winner of ₹1 crore. The 1000th episode of the show aired on 3 December. The final week of season was titled Shaandaar Shukriya, and the final episode was aired on 17 December.

=== Season 14: 2022 ===
The first episode of Season 14 premiered on Sunday, 7 August 2022. The "Triple Test" was continued for this season and the lifelines were reduced from 4 to 3. The "expert advice" and "flip the question" lifelines were removed, and video call a friend replaced these lifelines. The number of questions had increased to 17 for this season. On account of India's 75th year of independence, the final amount was increased to ₹7.5 crore, an increase of ₹50 lakhs and a new threshold at ₹75 lakhs was added to prevent the player from going down if they did incorrectly answer the ₹1 crore question, which was the value of the 16th/penultimate question. Two people answered the ₹1 crore question incorrectly in the season.

Kavita Chawla was the only 1 crore winner.

Shashwat Goel is the first and only contestant to have attempted Question 17 worth ₹7.5 crores. After winning INR 1 crore, he had very logically explained the rationale that if he got it right then it would be an increment of 650% to INR 7.5 crore vs getting it wrong would reduce his prize winnings by 25% only, back down to INR 75,00,000. Goel answered the final question incorrectly and won ₹75,00,000. The final episode aired on 30 December 2022.

=== Season 15: 2023 ===
Sony Entertainment Television announced the 15th season of KBC on 18 April 2023. The promo for registration was also released on the same day. Registration started on 29 April 2023 at 9:00 PM IST.

The first episode aired on 14 August 2023. A new rule was introduced wherein when the player crosses the first threshold, a question would be asked from a person from anywhere in India and the audience would answer it using their voting devices; the audience member who answered correctly in the least time would be given a prize.

A new mini-game, "Super Sandook" (transl. Super Chest) was introduced: after crossing the second threshold, players attempt a rapid-fire 10-question round lasting 90 seconds, with each correct answer giving them ₹10,000. If they won ₹50,000 or more, the contestant could either bank the amount or revive a lifeline used earlier.

The 50:50 lifeline was replaced with the Double Dip. The Triple Test was replaced with Fastest Finger First. The Double Dip and Video Call a Friend lifelines were replaced by Flip the Question and Ask the Expert during the Kids Week specials.

Jaskaran Singh, a man aiming for the Indian Administrative Service, became the first Rs. 1 crore winner of the season on 5 September. Jasnil Kumar became the second Rs. 1 crore winner on 21 September. On 28 November, a boy named Mayank became the youngest ever crorepati on the show. The final episode aired on 29 December.

=== Season 16: 2024–2025 ===
Sony Entertainment Television announced the 16th season of KBC on 16 April 2024. Registration began on 26 April. The season premiered on 12 August.

A new segment called 'Super Sawaal' was started. After crossing the first threshold of Rs. 10,000, a question is presented without any options. The contestant has to answer it without options. If the answer is correct, a power-up called 'Dugnaastra' is activated. The contestant can use this power-up only once between questions 6 and 10. The contestant presses a buzzer before the options are presented. On pressing the buzzer, the power-up is activated. It doubles the prize amount for that particular question. If the answer is correct, the contestant wins a bonus of the same amount of prize money. The contestant answers this question without any lifeline. The 'Super Sandook' segment was continued from the previous season.

Unlike the previous seasons, in which KBC Play Along contestants used to get a chance to be on the hot seat every Friday, this time a whole week, generally the last week of the month is dedicated to KBC Play Along contestants and is called 'India Challenger Week'. The top two winners of the Fastest Finger First round come for a 'Jaldi 5' round, where questions will be put up, and the one who presses a buzzer first and answers it correctly wins a point. The first one to get 5 correct answers gets on the hot seat.

In December 2024, registrations were opened again to celebrate the 25th anniversary of the show. On 20 January 2025, The show began its 25th-anniversary celebrations and began a new segment Kahaani Jeet Ki where all the crorepatis of previous seasons came into the show and talked about how KBC changed their lives. The final episode aired on 11 March 2025.

=== Season 17: 2025–2026 ===
Sony Entertainment Television announced the 17th season of KBC on 8 April 2025. Registration began on 14 April. The first episode aired on 11 August. The tagline used for the season was Jahan Akal Hai Wahan Akad Hai (transl. Where there is wisdom, there is confidence).

In this season, the Fastest Finger First format was changed. The top two contestants of the Fastest Finger First round qualify for a 'Jaldi 5' round, where questions will be put up, and the one who presses a buzzer first and answers it correctly wins a point. The first one to get 5 correct answers gets on the hot seat. This was introduced in the previous season as part of the India Challenger Week for KBC Play Along contestants, but this time, it has been incorporated for the full season. but This was removed after first 3 weeks and the normal format was reinstated.

On the occasion of the 25th anniversary of the show, for the first time, The Whole Money Tree has changed and is now named the Maha Money Tree. The First Question is now at ₹5000 instead of ₹1000, and the first threshold is increased from ₹10,000 to ₹25,000, and the second threshold is increased from ₹3,20,000 to ₹5,00,000.

The contestants who play Jaldi 5 will directly play from the 6th question onwards and has guaranteed winnings of ₹25,000.

A new lifeline has been introduced, which is known as Sanket Suchak. In this lifeline, the contestant can get to see a hint about the answer. The Double Dip lifeline was removed and the 50:50 lifeline was restored. The Super Sandook segment was continued from the previous season but the Super Sawaal and Dugnaastra have been discontinued.

This season of KBC ended on 2nd January 2026.

=== Season 18: 2026 ===
Sony Entertainment Television announced the 18th season of KBC on 4 March 2026. It premiered on 10 August 2026. Amitabh Bachchan is returning for season 18. The tagline used for the season was Iss Baar Sochna Padega (transl. "This time... you will have to think").

In this Season, the Fastest Finger First was changed to Fastest Buzzer First where a question will be put without options, and the contestant who will press the buzzer first and gives the right answer gets on the Hot Seat.

In this Season, The contestants will start the gameplay with 2 lifelines, Audience Poll and Sanket Suchak. A new segment called "Maha Sawaal" started in which after crossing the first threshold of ₹25,000, a question is presented without any options. The contestant has to answer it without options. If the answer is correct, another lifeline will be added known as Maha Flip. In this lifeline, if a contestant wants to change a question, The contestant will be provided with 2 questions in which they have to choose one question which they are comfortable and know the answer

Sanket Suchak was continued in this season with a change that Google Gemini will be used for providing the hint

Super Sandook was continued in this season with a change that the contestant can either deposit their money in the bank or get a fourth lifeline, 50:50.

On September 21, 2026, 'India Challenger Week' was re-introduced in which the top two contestants of the Fastest Buzzer First round qualify for a 'Jaldi 5' round, where questions will be put up, and the one who presses a buzzer first and answers it correctly wins a point. The first one to get 5 correct answers gets on the hot seat. The contestants who play Jaldi 5 will directly play from the 6th question onwards and has guaranteed winnings of ₹25,000 and will have 3 lifelines from the beginning.

==== KBC Tournament ====
For the first time in the history of KBC, KBC Tournament was announced. the 10 contestants face the regular ruleset of the current season. Fastest Buzzer First is played. The winner moves on to play in the Hot Seat. Only the Top 4 players of the week will advance into the finale episode, keeping their previous total winnings as guaranteed prizes. The Tournament leaderboard ranking is determined by 3 criterias: Total Winnings in Main Game, Super Sandook Points, and the Contestant's Fastest Buzzer Time for the question that earned into the Hot Seat.

The top 4 finalists will compete for a Knockout Round where the contestants will have to face 10 questions, divided in 2 parts. The top 4 finalists will face the first 5 questions and the Ranking is based on 2 criterias: Correct Answers Given and Total Time for Correct Answers. After the first part of questions, The contestant who gave less number of correct answers or took more time will be eliminated and the remaining 3 finalists will face second part of the questions, after which the top 2 finalists will get a chance to sit on the hot seat.

The final two compete in the Hot Seat for the victory flag, The contestant who wins the final round will take home with additional winnings on top of their previous winnings and . They will have to face 10 questions with a modified Money Tree for the tournament. All the questions will have no time limit and will have 3 lifelines: Audience Poll, 50:50 and Sanket Suchak.

Question Number	Payout Structure
Question Number	Tournament
10	₹7 Crore
9	₹1 Crore
8	₹75,00,000
7	₹50,00,000
6	₹30,00,000
5	₹15,00,000
4	₹10,00,000
3	₹8,00,000
2	₹4,00,000
1	₹2,00,000

== Gameplay ==
=== Qualification ===
Similar to the original series in the United Kingdom, members of the public completed a qualification quiz which opened at the start of each series at various times in the year (also known as "registration"). Applicants would send a premium-rate SMS to a designated number, and answer a question by responding. Contestants would complete a series of interviews before being randomly selected from a pool of other hopeful contestants and appearing on the set in Fastest Finger First. In order to be eligible, contestants must be residents and citizens of India and at least 18 years of age. Even if the contestants are below 18 years of age (only in the junior special episodes), the prize money they earn will be called points and deposited in their fixed deposit but will be converted to rupees when they cross 18 years of age.

=== Fastest Finger Contest winner ===
The selected contestants are then brought to the studio to play Fastest Finger First where they will be asked to arrange four answers into the designated order in the shortest amount of time. In Season 7, contestants would play three questions and the one who answered the most correctly in the shortest amount of time will get selected to sit in the hot seat. In the 13 & 14 season, Triple Test replaced Fastest Finger Contest in which contestants have to answer three questions with four options like the ones in the game. One who has the most correct answers in the least time (added for the three questions) came in the hotseat. Fastest Finger Contest was re-introduced in Season 15.

In Season 17, the Fastest Finger First format was changed. The top two contestants of the Fastest Finger First round qualify for a 'Jaldi 5' round, where questions will be put up, and the one who presses a buzzer first and answers it correctly wins a point. The first one to get 5 correct answers gets on the hot seat, but this format was discontinued after 1st 3 weeks and the normal format was reinstated.

In Season 18, the Fastest Finger First was changed to Fastest Buzzer First where a question will be put and the contestant who will press the buzzer first and gives the right answer gets on the Hot Seat.

=== Main gameplay ===
After determining the winner of Fastest Finger First, they would join the host in the "Hot Seat" to start answering a series of multiple-choice questions on their way to win the top cash prize as outlined in the table below. Along the way, the contestant is free to walk away from the game with their winnings but if they got a question wrong, they would walk away with nothing unless they correctly answered a milestone question (highlighted in yellow) that would guarantee some winnings.

To help them along the way, much like its counterparts, the contestant had a set of lifelines available for them to use. Which lifelines were available was dependent on the format being used.

- Audience Poll (Ask The Audience): The studio audience would dial into a keypad what they believed was the correct answer to the question. The results of the poll are shown to the contestant. This lifeline was there in almost all the seasons, but it was removed in Season 12 as there was no studio audience due to COVID-19 guidelines. In Season 13, this lifeline was reinstated due to the relaxing of COVID-19 lockdowns across India.
- 50:50: The computer would remove two wrong answers from the game, leaving the contestant one right and one wrong answer.
- Video A Friend (Phone-A-Friend): The contestant could call a pre-selected friend or family member of their choosing to aid them in answering the question. Once connected, the aiding party and the contestant had 30 seconds (45 in season 7) to talk it out among themselves. In 2017, this became a video call instead of a voice call. For season 10, this lifeline was removed in favor of reinstating Ask the Expert, but later returned in season 12 as a replacement of Audience Poll due to COVID-19 pandemic. It was removed for a second time in season 13, but then reinstated for a second time in Season 14. As of now, it has discontinued since Season 17
- Flip The Question (Switch The Question/Switch): The current question would be thrown out and replaced with a new question. Any lifelines expended on the original question remained expended. It was introduced in season 2, removed after season 3, and reinstated for season 7 and 11. During seasons 2 and 3 it could only be used after the 5th question, while it was available from the beginning in season 7. In season 11, a new question would be from a contestant's pre-selected category out of a given choice of 11 categories. This lifeline was removed in season 15 but it was used for Juniors Special Episodes under the name Gyanastra.
- Double Dip: As featured on the US Super Millionaire, this granted the contestant two chances to answer the question. However, invoking this lifeline removed the ability to walk away from the question. The contestant must answer twice with no further usage of lifelines. (They may use other lifelines before invoking Double Dip but not during the resolution of the lifeline.) In the event of a clocked game, the timer would stop for the first guess only. After that, if the first guess was wrong, the timer resumed counting down. If the contestant did not make their second guess before the time limit or if it was wrong, the contestant would walk away from the game with the lower threshold amount, if any. It was reinstated in Season 15.
- Expert Advice (Ask the Expert): In season 4, the "Expert Advice" lifeline was added to the pool of lifelines available. The producers would invite certain general knowledge experts to come to the studio to aid the contestant. This lifeline was restored for season 10 in 2018. This was discontinued in Season 14. This lifeline was used for Juniors Special Episodes.
- Power Paplu: Introduced in the season 7, this lifeline allowed the contestant to reuse a lifeline that was previously used on another question. It could not be a lifeline that was used on the current question.
- Triguni (lit. 'Three Wise Men'): Similar to its US counterpart, the producers would invite certain general knowledge experts or celebrities to come to the studio to aid the contestant. When invoked, the "Three Wise Men" were granted 30 seconds to discuss the question and the possible choices among themselves to come up with a consensus answer to relay back to the contestant who was often within earshot of the conversation. Once the time expired, the "Three Wise Men" were instructed to stop discussing the question, and play resumed as normal.
- Jodidaar (lit. 'Partner'): Introduced in 2017, similar to the United States' Plus One lifeline, in addition to having 3 Phone-a-Friends, the contestant can also bring a designated family member or friend in to aid them in answering the question. (This person is designated by the contestant prior to the show.)
- Sanket Suchak: Introduced in Season 17, The contestant can get a hint about the answer for a particular question.

Additionally, starting in season 4, the contestant would have to answer these questions within a certain amount of time. Contestants were allotted 30 seconds to respond up to and including the first threshold question (in 2017, this was increased to 45 seconds). The following question up to and including the next threshold contestants were allotted 60 seconds to give their "final answer". For the final set of questions (the question following the second threshold) the questions were not timed. Using a lifeline paused the timer temporarily until it resolved. If the contestant used Flip The Question, the timer would restart from the base value of the question.

The total number of questions varied over the multiple seasons of the show's run. As the number of questions changed, so did the total prize money available. In 2017, KBC introduced a jackpot question. For the Jackpot Question, the contestants were not allowed to use any of the remaining lifelines.

In seasons 5 and 6, the contestants had to select a threshold or "Padao" themselves. They were allowed to choose any one question on the tree and designate that as a threshold amount, meaning that if they cross the threshold, they were guaranteed that amount of cash winnings. Getting a question wrong before the Padao is reached would result in zero winnings.

Question number	Payout structure								
Question number	Season 1 (2000–01)	Seasons 2 & 3 (2005–2007)	Season 4 (2010)	Seasons 5 & 6 (2011–2013)	Season 7 (2013)	Season 8 (2014)	Seasons 9–13, 15–16 (2017–2021, 2023–2025)	Season 14 (2022)	Season 17-18 (2025, 2026)
17	–	–	–	–	–	–	–	₹7.5 Crore	
16	–	–	–	–	–	–	₹7 Crore	₹1 Crore	₹7 Crore
15	Rs. 1 Crore	Rs. 2 Crore	–	–	₹7 Crore	–	₹1 Crore	₹7,500,000	₹1 Crore
14	Rs. 5,000,000	Rs. 1 Crore	–	–	₹5 Crore	₹7 Crore	₹5,000,000	₹5,000,000	₹5,000,000
13	Rs. 2,500,000	Rs. 5,000,000	₹5 Crore	₹5 Crore	₹3 Crore	₹3 Crore	₹2,500,000	₹2,500,000	₹2,500,000
12	Rs. 1,250,000	Rs. 2,500,000	₹1 Crore	₹1 Crore	₹1 Crore	₹1 Crore	₹1,250,000	₹1,250,000	₹1,250,000
11	Rs. 640,000	Rs. 1,250,000	₹5,000,000	₹5,000,000	₹5,000,000	₹5,000,000	₹640,000	₹640,000	₹750,000
10	Rs. 320,000	Rs. 640,000	₹2,500,000	₹2,500,000	₹2,500,000	₹2,500,000	₹320,000	₹320,000	₹500,000
9	Rs. 160,000	Rs. 320,000	₹1,250,000	₹1,250,000	₹1,250,000	₹1,250,000	₹160,000	₹160,000	₹300,000
8	Rs. 80,000	Rs. 160,000	₹640,000	₹640,000	₹640,000	₹640,000	₹80,000	₹80,000	₹200,000
7	Rs. 40,000	Rs. 80,000	₹320,000	₹320,000	₹320,000	₹320,000	₹40,000	₹40,000	₹100,000
6	Rs. 20,000	Rs. 40,000	₹160,000	₹160,000	₹160,000	₹160,000	₹20,000	₹20,000	₹50,000
5	Rs. 10,000	Rs. 20,000	₹80,000	₹80,000	₹80,000	₹80,000	₹10,000	₹10,000	₹25,000
4	Rs. 5,000	Rs. 10,000	₹40,000	₹40,000	₹40,000	₹40,000	₹5,000	₹5,000	₹20,000
3	Rs. 3,000	Rs. 5,000	₹20,000	₹20,000	₹20,000	₹20,000	₹3,000	₹3,000	₹15,000
2	Rs. 2,000	Rs. 3,000	₹10,000	₹10,000	₹10,000	₹10,000	₹2,000	₹2,000	₹10,000
1	Rs. 1,000	Rs. 1,000	₹5,000	₹5,000	₹5,000	₹5,000	₹1,000	₹1,000	₹5,000

== Celebrity guests ==
=== Season 1 ===
Guest(s)	Year	Amount won	Notes
Sonali Bendre	2000	Rs. 25,00,000/-	Played in the Diwali special
Aamir Khan	2000	Rs. 50,00,000/-	First celebrity guest to play the game, played during the Diwali special
Rani Mukerji	2000	Rs. 50,00,000/-	Played in the New Year special.
Shah Rukh Khan	2001	Rs. 50,00,000/-	Played in the New Year special.
Sanjay Dutt	2001	Rs. 25,00,000/-	
Anil Kapoor	2001	Rs. 50,00,000/-	Played KBC host in Slumdog Millionaire
Sachin Tendulkar, Madhuri Dixit	2001	Rs. 50,00,000/-	Won Rs. 50,00,000/- each in a special episode to raise funds for victims of the 2001 Gujarat earthquake
Amar Upadhyay, Smriti Irani	2001	Rs. 50,00,000/-	To celebrate the first anniversary of the show, for promoting Kyunki Saas Bhi Kabhi Bahu Thi
Sakshi Tanwar	2001	Rs. 3,20,000/-	for promoting Kahaani Ghar Ghar Kii

=== Season 2 ===
Guest(s)	Year	Amount won	Notes
Kajol, Ajay Devgn	2005	Rs. 1,00,00,000/-	Biggest celebrity winners on KBC with Bachchan
John Abraham, Bipasha Basu	2005	Rs. 25,00,000/-	
Sania Mirza, Lara Dutta	2005	Rs. 50,00,000/-	Appeared on Children's day.
Saif Ali Khan, Preity Zinta	2005	Rs. 50,00,000/-	To promote their film "Salaam Namaste"
Smriti Irani, Sakshi Tanwar	2005	Rs. 6,40,000/-	Both Smriti and Sakshi's second time, for promoting Kyunki Saas Bhi Kabhi Bahu Thi and Kahaani Ghar Ghar Kii

=== Season 3 ===
Guest(s)	Date	Amount won	Episode	Notes
Arbaaz Khan, Malaika Arora	14 February 2007	Rs. 12,50,000/-	Valentine's Day	
Farhan Akhtar, Zoya Akhtar	14 February 2007	Rs. 25,00,000/-	Valentine's Day	
Karan Johar, Farah Khan	14 February 2007	Rs. 25,00,000/-	Valentine's Day	Johar's second appearance on the show The first time he appeared in the audience with Bachchan in 2000 to support Shahrukh Khan
Preity Zinta, Rani Mukerji	27 February 2007	Rs. 50,00,000/-	Holi Special	Both Zinta and Mukerji's second time on the show
Sanjay Dutt, Boman Irani	29 March 2007	Rs. 50,00,000/-		Dutt's second time on the show
Priyanka Chopra, Kareena Kapoor	19 April 2007	Rs. 50,00,000/-	Series Finale	
Salman Khan, Katrina Kaif	19 April 2007	Rs. 50,00,000/-	Series Finale	

=== Season 4 ===
Guest(s)	Date	Notes
Madhuri Dixit	6 December 2010	For promoting Jhalak Dikhhla Jaa season 4, Dixit's second time on the show.
Deepika Padukone	7 December 2010	For promoting Khelein Hum Jee Jaan Sey
Sanjay Dutt, Anil Kapoor	8 December 2010	For promoting No Problem, Dutt's third and Anil's second time on the show.
Dharmendra	9 December 2010	For promoting Yamla Pagla Deewana

=== Season 4 Hot Seat ===
Guest(s)	Qualified Guest(s)	Date	Amount won	Notes
Aditya Roy Kapur, Vipul Shah, Neha Dhupia, Rannvijay Singha, Shefali Shah	Akshay Kumar	1 November 2010	₹50,00,000/-	For the promotion of Action Replayy
Leander Paes, S. Sreesanth, Sushil Kumar, Jwala Gutta, Ashwini Ponnappa	Manoj Kumar	2 November 2010	₹25,00,000/-	Diwali Special
Pooja Gor, Aashka Goradia, Bharti Singh, Aishwarya Sakhuja	Ragini Khanna	3 November 2010	₹12,50,000/-	Diwali Special
Arshad Warsi, Shreyas Talpade, Rohit Shetty, Tusshar Kapoor, Kunal Khemu	Ajay Devgan	4 November 2010	₹25,00,000/-	For the promotion of Golmaal 3. Devgan's second time on the show.

=== Season 5 ===
Guest(s)	Date	Amount won	Notes
Deepika Padukone, Saif Ali Khan	18 August 2011	–	For the promotion of Aarakshan Both Padukone And Khan's second time on the show.
Shahid Kapoor, Sonam Kapoor	1 September 2011	₹12,50,000/-	For the promotion of Mausam
Imran Khan, Katrina Kaif	8 September 2011	₹12,50,000/-	For the promotion of Mere Brother Ki Dulhan Kaif's second time on the show
Ranbir Kapoor	15 September 2011	₹12,50,000/-	For the promotion of Rockstar
John Abraham	October 2011	–	For the promotion of Desi Boyz John's second time on the show.
Shah Rukh Khan	20 October 2011	₹50,00,000/-	For the promotion of Ra.One Shahrukh's second time as a Contestant.
Ram Kapoor, Sakshi Tanwar	27 October 2011	₹25,00,000/-	In Diwali special episode, promoting Bade Achhe Lagte Hain Tanwar's third appearance on the show
Vidya Balan	10 November 2011	₹12,50,000/-	For the promotion of The Dirty Picture
Harbhajan Singh	15 November 2011	–	For the promotion of Pepsi Ad
Ranveer Singh, Anushka Sharma	16 November 2011	–	For the promotion of Ladies vs Ricky Bahl.

=== Season 6 ===
Guest(s)	Date	Amount won	Notes
Sridevi, Gauri Shinde	7 October 2012	₹6,40,000/-	For the promotion of English Vinglish.
Karan Johar, Alia Bhatt, Varun Dhawan, Sidharth Malhotra	14 October 2012	₹6,40,000/-	For the promotion of Student of the Year Johar's third appearance on the show.
Falguni Pathak	20 October 2012	–	For giving special performance during Navratri.
Shah Rukh Khan, Katrina Kaif	4 November 2012	₹25,00,000/-	For the promotion of Jab Tak Hai Jaan Shahrukh's and Kaif's third time on the show.
Ajay Devgn, Sonakshi Sinha	18 November 2012	₹3,20,000/-	For the promotion of Son of Sardaar Devgn's third appearance on the show.
Lara Dutta and Sonali Mukherjee	25 November 2012	₹25,00,000/-	For the show special segment Doosra Mauka Lara's second appearance on the show.
Ram Kapoor, Sakshi Tanwar, Amrita Mukherjee	16 December 2012	₹12,50,000/-	For the Christmas special episode, promoting Bade Achhe Lagte Hain Sakshi's fourth and Ram's second time on the show.
Sharad Kelkar, Kritika Kamra	16 December 2012	₹6,40,000/-	For the Christmas special episode, promoting Kuch Toh Log Kahenge
Manoj Bajpayee	13 January 2013		For the show special segment Doosra Mauka.
Anil Kapoor	20 January 2013	₹6,40,000/-	For the promotion of Race 2 Anil's third time on the show.

=== Season 7 ===
Guest(s)	Year	Amount won	Note
Ranbir Kapoor and Neetu Kapoor	22 September 2013	₹12,50,000/-	Ranbir's second appearance on the show.
Sumit Awasthi	6 October 2013	₹12,50,000/-	
Sangita Ghosh and Ruslaan Mumtaz	13 October 2013	₹3,20,000/-	For promoting Jee Le Zara
Dilip Joshi and Disha Vakani	13 October 2013	₹6,40,000/-	For promoting Taarak Mehta Ka Ooltah Chashmah
Kajol	10 November 2013	₹12,50,000/-	Kajol's second appearance on the show
Ranveer Singh	15 November 2013	–	Ranveer's second appearance on the show
Kareena Kapoor and Imran Khan	23 November 2013	–	Both Kareena and Imran's second appearance on the show

=== Season 8 ===
Guest(s)	Date	Amount won	Episode	Notes
Rani Mukerji	21 August 2014	₹25,00,000/-	Episode 4	For the promotion Mardaani Rani's third time on the show.
Aditya Roy Kapur and Parineeti Chopra	28 August 2014	–	Episode 8	For the promotion Daawat-e-Ishq Roy Kapur's second time on the show.
Priyanka Chopra	4 September 2014	₹12,50,000/-	Episode 12	For the promotion Mary Kom Priyanka's second time on the show.
Arjun Kapoor and Deepika Padukone	11 September 2014	–	Episode 16	For the promotion of their film Finding Fanny, Padukone's third time on the show.
Fawad Khan and Sonam Kapoor	18 September 2014	–	Episode 20	For the promotion Khoobsurat Sonam's second appearance on the show.
Shivaji Satam, Aditya Srivastava, Dayanand Shetty and Narendra Gupta	24 September 2014	₹6,40,000/-	Episode 23	For the promotion of CID
Anuj Sachdeva and Smriti Kalra	25 September 2014	₹1,60,000/-	Episode 24	For the promotion of serial Itti Si Khushi
Shahid Kapoor and Shraddha Kapoor	25 September 2014	₹3,20,000/-	Episode 24	For the promotion of their film Haider, Shahid's second time on the show
Shah Rukh Khan, Abhishek Bachchan, Deepika Padukone, Boman Irani, Sonu Sood, Vivaan Shah, Farah Khan	21 October 2014	₹12,50,000/-	Episode	For the promotion of their film Happy New Year Shahrukh and Deepika's fourth and Farah and Boman's second time on the show.
Anup Soni	6 November 2014	₹25,00,000/-	Episode 48	
Ravi Kishan, Kamya Panjabi, Jamnadas Majethia, Anita Hassanandani, Vishal Singh, Shweta Tiwari, Karan Tacker, Shaleen Malhotra	9 November 2014	–	Episode 49	For the promotion of Box Cricket League
Ajay Devgn, Sonakshi Sinha and Prabhu Deva	9 November 2014	–	Episode 49	For the promotion of Action Jackson Devgn's fourth and Sinha's second time on the show.
Govinda, Ranveer Singh, Ali Zafar and Parineeti Chopra	16 November 2014	₹12,50,000/-	Episode 50	For the promotion of Kill Dil Ranveer's third and Parineeti's second time on the show

=== Season 9 ===
Guest(s)	Date	Amount won	Notes
Mithali Raj, Smriti Mandhana, Punam Raut, Harmanpreet Kaur, Veda Krishnamurthy, Jhulan Goswami and Deepti Sharma	1 September 2017	₹6,40,000	
Anand Kumar	8 September 2017	₹25,00,000	
Abhishek Bachchan	15 September 2017	₹25,00,000	Abhishek's second time on the show
Shreegauri Sawant and Usha Uthup	22 September 2017	₹25,00,000	
Shilpa Shetty	29 September 2017	₹25,00,000	For promoting Super Dancer Chapter 2
P. V. Sindhu	6 October 2017	₹25,00,000	
Niladri Kumar	11 October 2017	–	For celebrating Bachchan's birthday.
Sonam Wangchuk	13 October 2017	₹50,00,000	
Ayushmann Khurrana	20 October 2017	₹50,00,000	
Taapsee Pannu	27 October 2017	₹25,00,000	
Kailash Satyarthi and Sumedha Satyarthi	6 November 2017	₹50,00,000	
Yuvraj Singh, Vidya Balan	7 November 2017	₹25,00,000	Balan's second time on the show

=== Season 10 ===
Guest(s)	Date	Amount won	Notes
Kajol	14 September 2018	₹6,40,000	For promoting Helicopter Eela, Kajol's third time on the show
Anushka Sharma and Varun Dhawan	21 September 2018	₹25,00,000	For promoting Sui Dhaaga, Both Sharma and Dhawan's second time on the show
Ayushmann Khurrana	26 October 2018	₹25,00,000	For promoting Badhaai Ho, Khurrana's second time on the show
Aamir Khan	2 November 2018	₹25,00,000	For promoting Thugs of Hindostan, Aamir's second appearance on the show.
Anurag Basu	23 November 2018	₹25,00,000	For the promotion of Super Dancer Chapter 3
Kapil Sharma	26 November 2018	₹25,00,000	For the promotion of The Kapil Sharma Show Season 2

=== Season 11 ===
Guest(s)	Date	Amount won	Notes
Sonakshi Sinha	20 September 2019	₹25,00,000/-	Sinha's second time on the show
Randeep Hooda	27 September 2019	₹25,00,000/-	
Dutee Chand and Virender Sehwag	1 November 2019	₹12,50,000/-	
Sakshi Tanwar	8 November 2019	₹25,00,000/-	Sakshi's fifth time on the show.
Taapsee Pannu	15 November 2019	₹12,50,000/-	Pannu's second time on the show.
Emraan Hashmi	22 November 2019	₹6,40,000/-	
Sudha Murty	29 November 2019	₹25,00,000/-	

=== Season 12 ===
Guest(s)	Date	Amount won	Notes
Sunil Shroff and Riteish Deshmukh	9 October 2020	₹25,00,000/-	
Anup Soni	30 October 2020	₹25,00,000/-	Soni's second time on the show
Ratna Pathak Shah	6 November 2020	₹25,00,000/-	
Leander Paes and Dipa Karmakar	13 November 2020	₹12,50,000/-	Paes' second time on the show.
Nagraj Manjule	20 November 2020	₹25,00,000/-	
Boman Irani	18 December 2020	₹50,00,000/-	Boman's third time on the show
Anurag Basu	25 December 2020	₹25,00,000/-	Basu's second time on the show
Sonu Sood	1 January 2021	₹25,00,000/-	Sood's second time on the show
Raveena Tandon	8 January 2021	₹25,00,000/-	
Anupam Kher	15 January 2021	₹25,00,000/-	
Yogendra Singh Yadav and Sanjay Kumar	22 January 2021	₹25,00,000/-	

=== Season 13 ===
Guest(s)	Date	Amount won	Notes
Sourav Ganguly and Virender Sehwag	3 September 2021	₹25,00,000/-	Sehwag's second time on the show.
Farah Khan and Deepika Padukone	10 September 2021	₹25,00,000/-	Padukone's fifth and Farah's second time on the show
Neeraj Chopra and P. R. Sreejesh	17 September 2021	₹25,00,000/-	
Jackie Shroff and Suniel Shetty	24 September 2021	₹25,00,000/-	
Pankaj Tripathi and Pratik Gandhi	1 October 2021	₹12,50,000/-	
Riteish Deshmukh and Genelia D'Souza	8 October 2021	₹25,00,000/-	Riteish's second time on the show
Hema Malini and Ramesh Sippy	15 October 2021	₹25,00,000/-	
Shaan and Sonu Nigam	22 October 2021	₹25,00,000/-	
Rajkummar Rao and Kriti Sanon	29 October 2021	₹25,00,000/-	For promoting Hum Do Hamare Do
Akshay Kumar, Katrina Kaif and Rohit Shetty	5 November 2021	₹25,00,000/-	For promoting Sooryavanshi Kaif's fourth while Akshay and Rohit's second time on the show.
Sonu Sood and Kapil Sharma	12 November 2021	₹25,00,000/-	Sood's third and Kapil's second time on the show.
Saif Ali Khan, Rani Mukerji, Siddhant Chaturvedi, Sharvari	19 November 2021	₹25,00,000/-	For the promotion of Bunty Aur Babli 2 Rani's fourth and Saif's third time on the show.
John Abraham, Divya Khosla Kumar and Nikkhil Advani	26 November 2021	₹25,00,000/-	For promoting Satyameva Jayate 2. John's third time on the show.
Shweta Bachchan, Navya Naveli Nanda	3 December 2021	₹25,00,000/-	
Taarak Mehta Ka Ooltah Chashmah - Cast	10 December 2021	₹25,00,000/-	
Ayushmann Khurrana, Vaani Kapoor and Abhishek Kapoor	13 December 2021	₹25,00,000/-	For promoting Chandigarh Kare Aashiqui Khurrana's third time on the show.
Maniesh Paul, Disha Parmar, Chandni Sharma and Additi Gupta	14 December 2021	₹25,00,000/-	For promoting Bade Achhe Lagte Hain 2, Kaamnaa and Dhadkan
Neha Kakkar and Badshah	15 December 2021	₹25,00,000/-	
Neena Gupta and Gajraj Rao	16 December 2021	₹12,50,000/-	
Irfan Pathan and Harbhajan Singh	17 December 2021	₹25,00,000/-	Singh's second time on the show.

=== Season 14 ===
Guest(s)	Date	Amount won	Notes
Aamir Khan, Major D. P. Singh, Col. Mitali Madhumita	7 August 2022	₹50,00,000/-	Aamir's third time on the show, for promoting Laal Singh Chaddha
Mary Kom, Sunil Chhetri	7 August 2022	₹12,50,000/-	
Nikhat Zareen, Mirabai Chanu	5 September 2022	₹25,00,000/-	
Abhishek Bachchan and Jaya Bachchan	11 October 2022	-	Abhishek's third time on the show.
Neena Gupta, Anupam Kher, Boman Irani	7 November 2022	₹25,00,000/-	For promoting Uunchai Boman's fourth while Neena and Kher's second time on the show.
Kajol, Revathi, Sujatha Kolvenu	5 December 2022	₹6,40,000/-	For promoting Salaam Venky Kajol's fourth time on the show.
Garima Arora, Vikas Khanna, Ranveer Brar	26 December 2022	₹12,50,000/-	For promoting MasterChef India – Hindi season 7.
Prakash Singh, Akshay Kumar	27 December 2022	₹25,00,000/-	Akshay's third time on the show.
Anupam Mittal, Peyush Bansal, Vineeta Singh, Aman Gupta, Amit Jain, Namita Thapar	28 December 2022	₹25,00,000/-	For promoting Shark Tank India season 2
Vicky Kaushal, Kiara Advani	29 December 2022	₹12,50,000/-	For promoting Govinda Naam Mera

=== Season 15 ===
Guest(s)	Date	Amount won	Notes
Abhishek Bachchan, Saiyami Kher, R. Balki	18 August 2023	₹12,50,000	For promoting Ghoomer. Abhishek's fourth time on the show.
Neeru Yadav	11 September 2023	₹6,40,000	
Vicky Kaushal, Manushi Chhillar	15 September 2023	₹12,50,000	For promoting The Great Indian Family Kaushal's second time on the show.
Zakir Khan	25 September 2023	₹12,50,000	
Shefali Shah	16 October 2023	₹25,00,000	
Sumeet Raghavan, Pariva Pranati, Bharati Achrekar	3 November 2023	₹12,50,000	For promoting Wagle Ki Duniya – Nayi Peedhi Naye Kissey
Zoya Akhtar, Agastya Nanda, Khushi Kapoor, Suhana Khan, Vedang Raina, Mihir Ahuja, Aditi "DOT" Saigal, Yuvraj Menda	14 December 2023	₹25,00,000	For promoting The Archies Zoya's second time on the show.
Smriti Mandhana and Ishan Kishan	25 December 2023	₹12,50,000	Mandhana's second time on the show.
Vidya Balan, Sheetal Devi	29 December 2023	₹12,50,000	Balan's third time on the show.
Sharmila Tagore, Sara Ali Khan	29 December 2023	₹12,50,000	

=== Season 16 ===
Guest(s)	Date	Amount won	Episode	Notes
Aman Sehrawat, Manu Bhaker	5 September 2024	₹29,10,000	Episode 19	Includes a bonus of ₹3,20,000 using Dugnaastra and ₹90,000 from Super Sandook
Abhay and Rani Bang	13 September 2024	₹28,20,000	Episode 25	Includes a bonus of ₹3,20,000 using Dugnaastra
Shreya Ghoshal, Sonu Nigam	20 September 2024	₹26,60,000	Episode 30	Includes a bonus of ₹1,60,000 using Dugnaastra Nigam's second time on the show.
Navdeep Singh, Sumit Antil, Avani Lekhara	4 October 2024	₹26,60,000	Episode 40	Includes a bonus of ₹1,60,000 using Dugnaastra
Aamir Khan, Junaid Khan	11 October 2024	₹27,60,000	Episode 45	Includes a bonus of ₹1,60,000 using Dugnaastra and ₹1,00,000 from Super Sandook Aamir's fourth time on the show.
Niladri Kumar	11 October 2024	–	Episode 45	Niladri's second time on the show.
Vidya Balan, Kartik Aaryan	18 October 2024	₹28,20,000	Episode 50	Includes a bonus of ₹3,20,000 using Dugnaastra For promoting Bhool Bhulaiyaa 3 Balan's fourth time on the show.
Farah Khan, Boman Irani	25 October 2024	₹27,30,000	Episode 55	Includes a bonus of ₹1,60,000 using Dugnaastra and ₹70,000 from Super Sandook Boman's fifth and Farah's third time on the show
Varun Dhawan, Raj & DK	30 October 2024	₹12,50,000	Episode 60	For promoting Citadel: Honey Bunny Dhawan's third time on the show.
Manoj Kumar Sharma, Vikrant Massey	8 November 2024	₹16,00,000	Episode 65	Includes a bonus of ₹3,20,000 using Dugnaastra and ₹30,000 from Super Sandook
Abhishek Bachchan, Shoojit Sircar, Arjun Sen, Ahilya Bamroo	22 November 2024	₹26,60,000	Episode 75	Includes a bonus of ₹1,60,000 using Dugnaastra For promoting I Want to Talk; Abhishek's fifth time on the show.
Vishwas Nangare Patil and Sanjay Govilkar	26 November 2024	₹25,80,000	Episode 77	Includes a bonus of ₹80,000 using Dugnaastra
Nana Patekar	13 December 2024	₹15,70,000	Episode 90	Includes a bonus of ₹3,20,000 using Dugnaastra
Shankar Mahadevan, Gurdas Maan	31 December 2024	₹15,70,000	Episode 102	Includes a bonus of ₹3,20,000 using Dugnaastra
Samay Raina, Tanmay Bhat, Bhuvan Bam, Kamiya Jani	31 January 2025	₹12,50,000	Episode 125	

=== Season 17 ===
Guest(s)	Date	Amount won	Episode	Notes
Prerna Deosthalee, Vyomika Singh, Sofiya Qureshi	15 August 2025	₹25,00,000/-	Episode 5	
India women's national ice hockey team	29 August 2025	₹12,50,000/-	Episode 15	
Farhan Akhtar and Javed Akhtar	13 October 2025	₹50,00,000/-	Episode 46	Farhan's second time on the show; for promoting 120 Bahadur
Rishab Shetty	17 October 2025	₹12,50,000/-	Episode 50	For promoting Kantara: Chapter 1
Sunil Grover and Krushna Abhishek	24 October 2025	₹12,50,000/-	Episode 55	
Diljit Dosanjh	31 October 2025	₹50,60,000/-	Episode 60	Includes a bonus of ₹60,000 using Super Sandook
Anubhav Singh Bassi, Ravi Gupta, Harsh Gujral, Abhishek Upmanyu	14 November 2025	₹13,00,000/-	Episode 70	Includes a bonus of ₹50,000 using Super Sandook
Vishal Dadlani, Shekhar Ravjiani, Sukhwinder Singh, Shilpa Rao	20 November 2025	₹13,40,000/-	Episode 74	Includes a bonus of ₹90,000 using Super Sandook
Manoj Bajpayee, Jaideep Ahlawat, Sharib Hashmi	21 November 2025	₹13,20,000/-	Episode 75	Includes a bonus of ₹70,000 using Super Sandook; Manoj's second time on the show.
Kiku Sharda and Sudesh Lehri	28 November 2025	₹7,50,000/-	Episode 80	
India women's national cricket team	5 December 2025	₹12,50,000/-	Episode 85	
Kartik Aaryan and Ananya Panday	18 December 2025	₹12,50,000/-	Episode 94	For promoting Tu Meri Main Tera Main Tera Tu Meri; Kartik's second time on the show.
Ranveer Brar	25 December 2025	-	Episode 99	Brar's second time on the show.
Kumar Mangalam Birla	29 December 2025	₹25,00,000/-	Episode 101	
Agastya Nanda, Shweta Bachchan, Navya Naveli Nanda, Jaideep Ahlawat, Simar Bhatia, Sriram Raghavan	31 December 2025	₹12,50,000/-	Episode 103	For promoting Ikkis; Agastya, Shweta, Navya and Jaideep's second time on the show.
Vir Das, Mona Singh, Mithila Palkar, Sharib Hashmi	1 January 2026	–	Episode 104	For promoting Happy Patel: Khatarnak Jasoos Sharib's second time on the show.

=== Season 18 ===
Guest(s)	Date	Amount won	Episode	Notes
Aamir Khan, Sunny Deol, Preity Zinta	10 August 2026	₹25,00,000/-	Episode 1	To promote their film Batwara 1947; Aamir's fifth and Zinta's third time on the show.
Pawan Kumar Chandana, Naga Bharath Daka	14 August 2026	₹12,50,000/-	Episode 5	
Lovlina Borgohain, Sharmila Dhankar, Jhandu Kumar, Asmita Dey	17 August 2026	₹12,50,000/-	Episode 6	2026 CWG Medalists
Sunidhi Chauhan, Prasoon Joshi	21 August 2026	₹12,50,000/-	Episode 10	
Akshay Kumar, Saif Ali Khan, Priyadarshan	4 September 2026	₹25,00,000/-	Episode 20	To promote their film Haiwaan; Both Akshay and Saif's fourth time on the show.
Varun Grover, Gaurav Kapoor, Gaurav Gupta	18 September 2026	₹12,50,000/-	Episode 30	
Ujjwal Nikam, Rajkummar Rao, Wamiqa Gabbi	25 September 2026	₹12,50,000/-	Episode 35	To promote their film Prahaar; Rao's second time on the show
Ayushmann Khurrana and Sara Ali Khan	5 October 2026	₹12,50,000	Episode 41	
Madhuri Dixit	9 October 2026	₹25,00,000/-	Episode 45	
Falguni Pathak and Mika Singh	16 October 2026	₹12,50,000	Episode 50	
Ranbir Kapoor, Sai Pallavi and Ravi Dubey	29 October 2026	₹12,50,000	Episode 59	To promote their film Ramayana: Part 1

== Top prize winners ==
=== Harshvardhan Navathe (19 October 2000) ===
Navathe's Rs. 1 crore/- Question

Rs. 1 crore/- (15 of 15) – no time limit

Who among these does the Indian Constitution permit to take part in the proceedings of Parliament?

1. Solicitor General
2. Attorney General(correct answer)
3. Cabinet Secretary
4. Chief Justice

Harshvardhan Navathe became the first top prize winner of KBC when he won Rs. 1 crore/- on 19 October 2000.

=== Vijay Raul and Arundhati (2 May 2001) ===
Vijay Raul and Arundhati appeared in Season 1 and won Rs. 1 crore/- on 2 May 2001.

=== Ravi Mohan Saini (14 May 2001) ===
Saini's Rs. 1 crore/- Question

Rs. 1 crore/- (15 of 15) – no time limit

In 1992, who became the first sportsperson to be honored with the Rajiv Gandhi Khel Ratna award?

1. Vishwanathan Anand(correct answer)
2. Sachin Tendulkar
3. Geet Sethi
4. Leander Paes

Ravi Mohan Saini appeared on Kaun Banega Crorepati Junior at 14 and won Rs. 1 crore/- on 14 May 2001.

=== Sushil Kumar (2 November 2011) ===
Kumar's ₹5 crore/- Question

₹5 crore/- (13 of 13) – no time limit

Which colonial power ended its involvement in India by selling the rights of the Nicobar Islands to the British on 18 October 1868?

1. Belgium
2. Italy
3. Denmark(correct answer)
4. France

Hailing from a small village in Bihar, Sushil Kumar, who appeared in Season 5, is the first contestant to win ₹5 crore/-. He was a computer instructor under MNREGA earning a meagre ₹6,000/- (roughly $121) per month before his entry to KBC. For this reason, Kumar has been dubbed as the real "Slumdog Millionaire".

=== Sunmeet Kaur Sawhney (12 January 2013) ===
Sawhney's ₹5 crore/- Question

₹5 crore/- (13 of 13) – no time limit

Who is the first woman to successfully climb K2, the world's second-highest mountain peak?

1. Junko Tabei
2. Wanda Rutkiewicz(correct answer)
3. Tamae Watanabe
4. Chantal Manduit

Sunmeet Kaur Sawhney appeared in Season 6 and won ₹5 crore/-. She was the second ₹5 crore/- winner.

=== Achin and Sarthak Narula (9 October 2014) ===
The Narula brothers' ₹7 crore/- Question

₹7 crore/- (14 of 14) – no time limit

Who commanded the 'Hector', the first British trading ship to land at Surat?

1. Paul Canning
2. William Hawkins(correct answer)
3. Thomas Roe
4. James Lancaster

Achin and Sarthak Narula appeared in Season 8 and won ₹7 crore/-, making them the first and, as of now, only ₹7 crore/- winners. They are one of the biggest winners in Asian WWTBAM franchises. This particular scene was later used as an internet meme, due to Amitabh Bachchan shouting "7 crore!" and Achin and Sarthak jumping out of their seats and celebrating.

== In popular culture ==
Danny Boyle's 2008 film Slumdog Millionaire was loosely based on the show. The movie's host, based loosely on the actual host Amitabh Bachchan, was portrayed by Anil Kapoor. Kapoor himself has appeared on a celebrity version of the show.

KBC - The Game, a mobile video game developed by Vroovy (a joint venture of Hungama and Gameshastra) was developed as a tie-in release for the show.

Indiagames and Glu has also released a mobile video game based on the show.

In 2010, Sony Entertainment Television released a question book based on the show that featured Amitabh Bachchan and his signature in the book cover, called Kaun Banega Crorepati: 110 Crore Hindustani. The book have 1000 questions (for 110 Crore Hindustani), including Fastest Finger First and 12 question levels from ₹5,000 to ₹1 Crore.

== Production ==
=== Development ===
After Sameer Nair became the programming head of StarPlus in February 1999, he came across a clip from Who Wants to Be a Millionaire? in July 1999 through Steve Askew, the Australian programming head of the region and got the rights to produce here from ECM who had the Asian version rights. Then, Siddhartha Basu who earlier worked in the show A question of answers was roped to produce the show with his company Synergy communications. The show was then titled Kaun Banega Lakhpati with the maximum price amount decided to be Rs. 1 Lakh/-. In January 2000, Nair had a choice for Amitabh Bachchan to host the show. Rupert Murdoch, chairman of Star TV's parent firm News Corporation, in the next month, ordered to change the maximum amount to Rs. 1 crore/- and the series was accordingly retitled Kaun Banega Crorepati. Bachchan who was initially skeptical later agreed to host it. The sets were constructed in Mumbai's Film City in June 2000 and the series was launched in July 2000 during the time when the channel was in a revamp along with conversion into a full Hindi language channel from Bilingual English and Hindi language channel.

== Reception ==
=== Impact ===
The series which aired on StarPlus for three seasons is the first show that took the channel's viewership to a greater height, being one of the tops viewed Hindi GEC show in that time.

On 27 April 2007, Delhi High Court on becoming suspicious in the amount won by the actors and VVIPs (Very very important persons) being high unlike ordinary KBC contestants and ordered Monopolies and Restrictive Trade Practices Commission (MRTPC) to investigate into it. However, Star denied it and stated, "KBC-2 is purely a game of skill and not a game of chance; each and every question posed by KBC-2 requires certain ‘thinking’ and ‘exercise of intellect’ to win any sum of money." The case was soon stayed by the Supreme Court.

During the third season, in 2008, Star Plus and the show sponsor Airtel were penalized with Rs. 1 Crore by the National Consumer Commission on violating the Consumer Protection Act when they charged R.2.5 per SMS rather than R.1, earning a huge profit.

In 2010, after the third season, the show was shifted from Star Plus to Sony Entertainment Television who held the format, as the former did not renew their contract.

=== Ratings ===
The overall average rating of the first season was 14.1 TVR while the second and third got 11.1 and 6.8 TVRs.

The first season started with 22% of viewership garnering 8.96 TVR in the debut week and soon increased to 54% in the last week of July 2000 making it most watched television program and pushing the position of StarPlus to number one for the first time then and also reinvented Bollywood actor Amitabh Bachchan's career. The following seven days it gradually increased and got 9.57, 11, 12.6, 12.4, 12.9, 13.2 and 14.7 TVRs. Maintaining the viewership with around more than 10 TVR until November 2000, it dipped to 8–9 TVR in December 2000 and further to 6–7 TVR in January 2001 while in week ending 3 February 2001 it garnered 7.2 TVR, despite continued to hold its number one position throughout. The highest rating ever achieved by the series in that time was 27.13 TVR during October 2000.

The second season opened with 19.75 TVR in the launch day occupying the top position. In analysis of its viewership in specific regions of India, it had the highest viewership from Madhya Pradesh with 38 TVR during the premiere.

The third season hosted by Shah Rukh Khan received ratings lesser than the previous seasons which were hosted by Amitabh Bachchan and declined through its progress. The season opened with 12.33 TVR on 22 January 2007 with a reach of 23 million while the following days it declined to 10.44 and 7.36 TVRs. On 25 January, it increased to 9.24 TVR however not being able to match like previous seasons of Star Plus. The following week after premiere it improved and got 8.8, 9, 8.4 and 10 TVR from Monday to Thursday.

The fourth season which began airing on Sony Entertainment Television opened with 6.24 TVR while it averaged 5.2 TVR in the debut week and ended with an average rating of about 4 TVR.

The fifth season opened with 5.2 TVR and averaged 4.52 TVR in the week. In week 35, it was at the second position with 5.2 TVR. The highest rating of the season was 7.2 and 8 TVR for the two episodes aired on 1 and 2 November 2011, where contestant Sushil Kumar won ₹5 crores, being the highest rating achieved in last two years by any Hindi GEC. The overall average rating of the series was about 4 TVR.

The first episode of sixth season became the most watched Hindi GEC garnering 6.1 TVR making it the best television launch of the year and garnered 5.3 TVR the following day.

The launch episode of season eight had 8.96 million viewers and that week it averaged 5.2 million viewers.

The ninth season opened with 6.2 million impressions being second most-watched Hindi GEC in urban. Overall, the season was the most-watched Hindi GEC occupying first position for months.
