= Sonali Mukherjee =

Acid attack victim

Sonali Mukherjee is a woman from Dhanbad, India, whose face was permanently disfigured by an acid attack in 2003 when she was 18. Her family has spent all their savings on her treatment.

== Early life ==
Mukherjee was born in Dhanbad. She was a National Cadet Corps cadet, which she had to quit after her attack.

== Incident ==
In 2003, almost one and half months prior to the incident, three alleged assailants - Tapas Mitra, and his two friends Sanjay Paswan and Bhrahmadev Hajra - told her that she was a Ghamandi (arrogant) person, and they would teach her a lesson. Her father later complained to the families of the three men. On 22 April, when she was asleep on the roof of her house, she was attacked with acid and left with a burnt face and other severe injuries. Her sister was also injured in the incident.

== Aftermath ==
The perpetrators were sentenced to nine years in jail, but were granted bail when they appealed to the High Court. Mukherjee's family approached the court and various other authorities for justice, including the Chief Minister of Jharkhand, multiple MPs, but she received "aashwasan [assurances] ... nothing else".

Chandidas Mukherjee, Sonali's father, later stated in an interview: "We appealed in the high court... Nothing happened. They were sent to jail, but were released soon after. Now, they are busy enjoying their lives. The law against acid attackers needs to be made tougher. Otherwise, we will have many more Sonalis".

In February 2014, the State Government of Jharkhand appointed Sonali Mukherjee as Grade III clerk in the welfare department of the Bokaro deputy commissioner's office.

== Appearance in Kaun Banega Crorepati ==
Mukherjee drew global attention when she appealed for euthanasia. Her wish to meet Amitabh Bachchan on the sets of Kaun Banega Crorepati, season 6 was granted in 2012. Accompanied by Lara Dutta in the game, they won ₹2.5 million (US$30,000).
