= Gour Mohan Dutta =

Indian entrepreneur and founder of Boroline

Gour Mohun Dutta
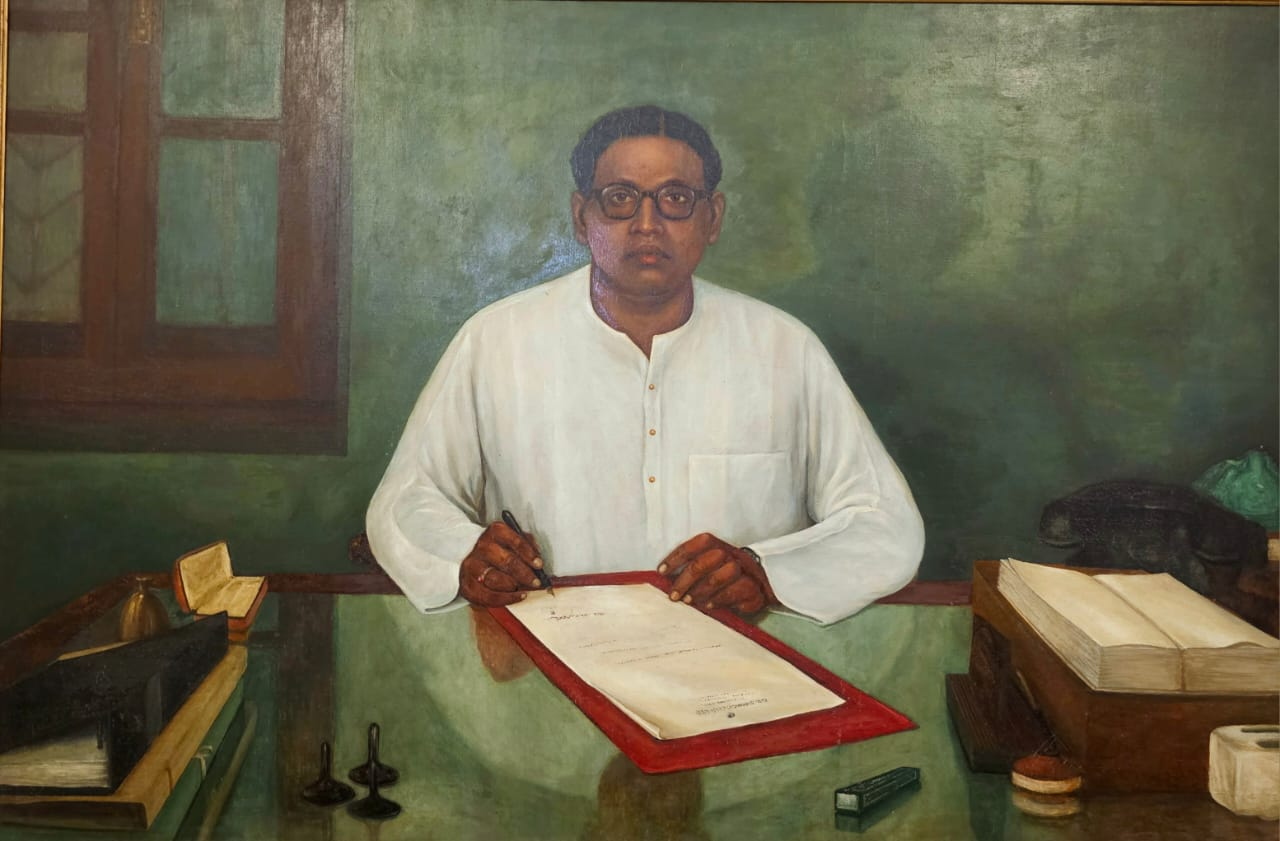
- Painting of Dutta from 1929
- Born: April 21, 1909; Sukhchar, Bengal Presidency, British India
- Died: July 6, 1956 (aged 47)
- Occupation: Entrepreneur
- Known for: Founder of Boroline

Gour Mohun Dutta (21 April 1909 – 6 July 1956) was an Indian entrepreneur from Bengal best known as the founder of the antiseptic cream brand Boroline. He established the product in 1929 and is associated with early indigenous manufacturing efforts linked to the Swadeshi movement.

== Early life and education ==
Gour Mohun Dutta was born on 21 April 1909 in Sukhchar, near Calcutta (now Kolkata), in the Bengal Presidency of British India. He was born into a Bengali merchant family.

His childhood coincided with the political unrest following the 1905 Partition of Bengal and the subsequent Swadeshi movement, which promoted the boycott of British goods and encouraged indigenous enterprise — a context that later influenced his entrepreneurial aims.

=== Influences ===
During this time, a young revolutionary named Radhakanta established an independent school in Sukchar. His aim was to nurture young minds free from colonial servility. Sambhu Dhan enrolled young Gour in this institution. Intelligent and quick to learn, Gour completed his schooling ahead of his age.

Company narratives further state that From his beloved “Mastarmoshai”, he learnt how the mighty British Empire had been compelled to bow before the Swadeshi movement. These formative years instilled in him a deep belief in self-reliance — the conviction that true strength lay in making indigenous products of superior quality - “Make in India”.

== Career ==
=== Seed of the Boroline Formula ===
After completing his education, Gour left Sukchar and began working on his own business in Burrabazar, British Calcutta’s wholesale mandi. Through his firm, G. Dutt & Co., located in Bonfield Lane, he dealt in imported goods, particularly medicines from Britain.

Among the products available in the market at the time was a British petroleum jelly–based ointment containing 10% boric acid, sold under the trade name Borofax. White petroleum jelly was also available in the open market. Gour saw potential in it — but he envisioned something better. He wanted to create a superior formulation of this cream and offer it to his countrymen at a fraction of the cost of imported creams.

Realising that white petrolatum could be easily melted, he began experimenting at home, carefully blending additional beneficial ingredients to enhance its healing properties..

=== Guidance from Acharya Prafulla Chandra Roy ===
Rajabazar Science College was established in 1914. In 1920, under the leadership of Sir Asutosh Mukherjee and Acharya Prafulla Chandra Roy, India’s first Department of Applied Chemistry for postgraduate research began there.

In 1928, at the age of nineteen, Gour Mohan gathered the courage to approach Acharya Prafulla Chandra Roy at Rajabazar Science College, located just two kilometers from his rented residence at Balak Dutta Lane. Lacking formal training or a degree in applied chemistry, he was very sure he will be asked to leave

According to company accounts published by G. D. Pharmaceuticals, To his utter surprise Acharya Prafulla Chandra gave him a patient hearing. Impressed by Gour Mohan’s self- practiced knowledge based product development, resilience and single-minded pursuit of purpose, the Acharya took the 19-year-old under his aegis. He gave him guidance on how to go about with the development.

=== Development of Boroline ===
According to company accounts and independent reports, After another year of dedicated research and refinement, Gour Mohan perfected his formulation. In 1929, he began making the cream at home, assisted by his young wife Kamala Bala. The product was packaged in a distinctive green container.

He called it Boroline — a homegrown remedy born from patriotism, perseverance and scientific guidance. In 1930, Gour Mohan Dutta got patent for Boroline and another self-developed product Asmolin, registered.

Independent coverage and brand profiles note that Boroline was launched within the ideological framework of the Swadeshi movement and was positioned as a homegrown alternative to foreign creams, helping it gain consumer trust in Bengal and neighbouring regions.

== Legacy ==
Boroline grew into a consumer healthcare brand in India. Journalistic profiles credit the product with cultural resonance and brand resilience across decades.
