= Mitali Madhumita =

Indian army officer

- Military career
- Allegiance: India
- Branch: Indian army
- Rank: Colonel
- Nickname: Mitali
- Commands: Army Education Corps, Kabul, Afghanistan 2010–2011
- Awards: Sena Medal

Mitali Madhumita is the first woman officer in the Indian Army to receive a gallantry award.

Colonel Mitali Madhumita received the Sena Medal in 2011 for exemplary courage shown during the attack on the Indian embassy by terrorists in Kabul, Afghanistan on 26 February 2010, when she was a Major and operations in Jammu-Kashmir and the northeast states of India. Colonel Madhumita went into the Indian embassy which had come under attack and rescued several injured civilians and army personnel from the debris. About nineteen people died in the 2010 Kabul embassy attack including seven Indians. She was said to be the first Indian woman officer to be awarded the Sena medal but there was a former example of CR Leema.

== Army career and the legal fight to stay in the army ==
Madhumita joined the army in the year 2000 on a short service commission. She was part of the Army Education Corps and served in Kabul, Afghanistan as a part of the army's English Language Training program. Madhumita was also posted in sensitive areas like Jammu-Kashmir and the northeast of the Indian state. Madhumita being a short service commission officer requested the army for a permanent commission but the Ministry of Defence refused to accept her request, Madhumita appealed the Ministry of Defence's decision not to give her permanent commission before the Armed Forces Tribunal in March 2014. The Tribunal found her request had merit and in February 2015 directed the Ministry of Defence to reinstate her. However the Ministry of Defence appealed the order of the Armed Forces Tribunal in the Supreme court of India stating that Madhumita had enlisted in the army on a short service commission. In 2016 Supreme court of India rejected the Ministry of Defence's plea against granting her a permanent commission in the Indian army. She is currently been appointed as the principal of Sainik School, Ambikapur in Chhattisgarh.

== Sena Medal ==
RIBBON

Sena Medal
