= Sawan Dutta =

Indian musician

Sawan Dutta is an Indian music director, composer, songwriter, record producer, vocalist and vlogger based in Bengaluru, India. She is best known for her original songs on her video song blog, The Metronome.

== Early life and education ==
Dutta was born in New Delhi, India. She had an early interest in music and learned to play the harmonium at the age of three. During her early teenage years, she taught herself to play the Hawaiian Guitar and auditioned successfully to be a regular paid performer at the All-India Radio company. After high school, Dutta joined the School of Planning and Architecture in New Delhi, India to train as an architect. During her college years at the School of Planning and Architecture, she was a member of the musical band The Archetypes. She also joined the pioneering fusion rock band Indian Ocean as a keyboardist and backup vocalist during her college years; she remains the only woman to have been a member of the band.

== Career ==
=== Television ===
Dutta has created music for TV shows, such as the soundtracks for the Indian adaptations of the TV show Who Wants to Be a Millionaire? called Kaun Banega Crorepati in Hindi and Ningalkkum Aakaam Kodeeswaran in Malayalam. Some of her other popular work on TV includes themes for Mastermind India, Bhanwar, India's Child Genius, It Happens Only In India, The History of Whatever and the National Award-winning cartoon series Jungle Tales.

=== Film ===
Dutta has composed songs for Bollywood films including Chai Pani (2004) and Mumbai Delhi Mumbai.

=== Other ===
Dutta has also worked on several other music albums, including her 2005 solo debut album Lady Chatterjee with the music label Saregama. She has produced music for other performing artists, including the Sarod Maestro Amjad Ali Khan and his sons Amaan and Ayaan Ali Khan, the flute player Ajay Prasanna, and the vocalist Vidya Shah.

Dutta has created soundtracks for documentary films such as The Underground Inferno and Cutting Carbon Footprint for the National Geographic Channel and Autumn in the Himalayas for the Public Broadcasting Service Trust.

She has also created advertisement jingles for brands like the Indian car manufacturer Maruti, KFC, UNICEF and others.

=== Awards ===
Dutta was awarded the Mahindra Excellence in Theatre Awards for her soundtrack for the puppeteer Dadi Pudumjee's theatrical production, Transpositions in 2008.

=== The Metronome ===
Dutta is known for her videos on her YouTube channel and website The Metronome in which she writes, composes and sings original songs on a number of subjects. Her recipe song series demonstrating various recipes from the Bengal region has attracted a large following across the globe. Dutta has collaborated with different advertising brands that sponsor her vlog posts, including Manhindra Agri Ltd, Fortune Foods Ltd, and the restaurant chain Oh! Calcutta. Her songs cover various genres including pop, jazz, Western and Indian classical, and electronica.

Some of her most popular vlog posts include An Ode to Boroline, Macher Jhol, and Kosha Mangsho.
