= List of Emirati films of 2014 =

The Emirati film industry produced over fifteen feature films in 2014. This article fully lists all non-pornographic films, including short films, that had a release date in that year and which were at least partly made by the United Arab Emirates. It does not include films first released in previous years that had release dates in 2014.
Also included is an overview of the major events in Emirati film, including film festivals and awards ceremonies, as well as lists of those films that have been particularly well received, both critically and financially.

== Major releases ==
Opening		Title	Cast and Crew	Studio	Genre(s)	Ref.
J U N E	13	Unforgettable	Director: Arshad Yusuf Pathan; Cast: Mohammed Iqbal Khan, Alka Verma, Hazel Crowney		Drama	
J U L Y	3	Desert Dancer	Director: Richard Raymond; Cast: Reece Ritchie, Freida Pinto, Nazanin Boniadi, Tom Cullen, Marama Corlett, Akin Gazi	Relativity Media	Biography; Drama	
A U G U S T	8	The Hundred-Foot Journey	Director: Lasse Hallström; Cast: Helen Mirren, Om Puri, Manish Dayal, Charlotte Le Bon	Walt Disney Studios; Motion Pictures	Comedy; Drama	
S E P T E M B E R	4	Theeb	Director: Naji Abu Nowar; Cast: Jacir Eid Al-Hwietat	Film Movement	Drama	
N O V E M B E R	6	A Most Violent Year	Director: J. C. Chandor; Cast: Oscar Isaac, Jessica Chastain, David Oyelowo, Alessandro Nivola, Albert Brooks, Elyes Gabel	A24	Crime	
D E C E M B E R	14	The Sea Is Behind	Director: Hisham Lasri; Cast: Malek Akhmiss		Drama	

== Minor releases ==
Title	Director	Release date	Genre
Abood Kandaishan	Fadel Almheiri	19 March 2015 (United Arab Emirates)	Comedy
December Riots	Dimitri Vorris		Thriller
Dolphins	Waleed Al-Shehhi	12 December 2014 (United Arab Emirates)	Adventure
I'm Dead	Yacine Benelhadj	December 2014 (United Arab Emirates)	Drama
I'm Dead		December 2014 (United Arab Emirates)	Thriller
Letter to the King	Hisham Zaman	17 January 2014 (Norway)	Drama
Out of Order	Mahmoud Kamel		Crime
Pahinjo Hikdo Hi Yaar Aa	Ramesh Nankani	16 May 2014 (United Arab Emirates)	Drama
Sara	Khalil al Mozian	December 2014 (United Arab Emirates)	Drama
The Journey to Her Smile	Sucheta Phule		Drama
The Sleeping Tree	Mohammed BuAli	13 December 2014 (United Arab Emirates)	Drama
Who Killed $arah?!: Vol.1	Mohammed Al Saber	15 December 2014 (United Arab Emirates)	Drama

== See also ==
- 2014 in film
- Cinema of United Arab Emirates
