= Vastani =

Vastani is a surname. Notable people with the surname include:

- Zaynah Vastani (born 2003), Indian actress
- Ziyah Vastani (born 2003), Indian actress
