= Preeti Kaur =

Nepalese-Punjabi pop singer (born 1981)

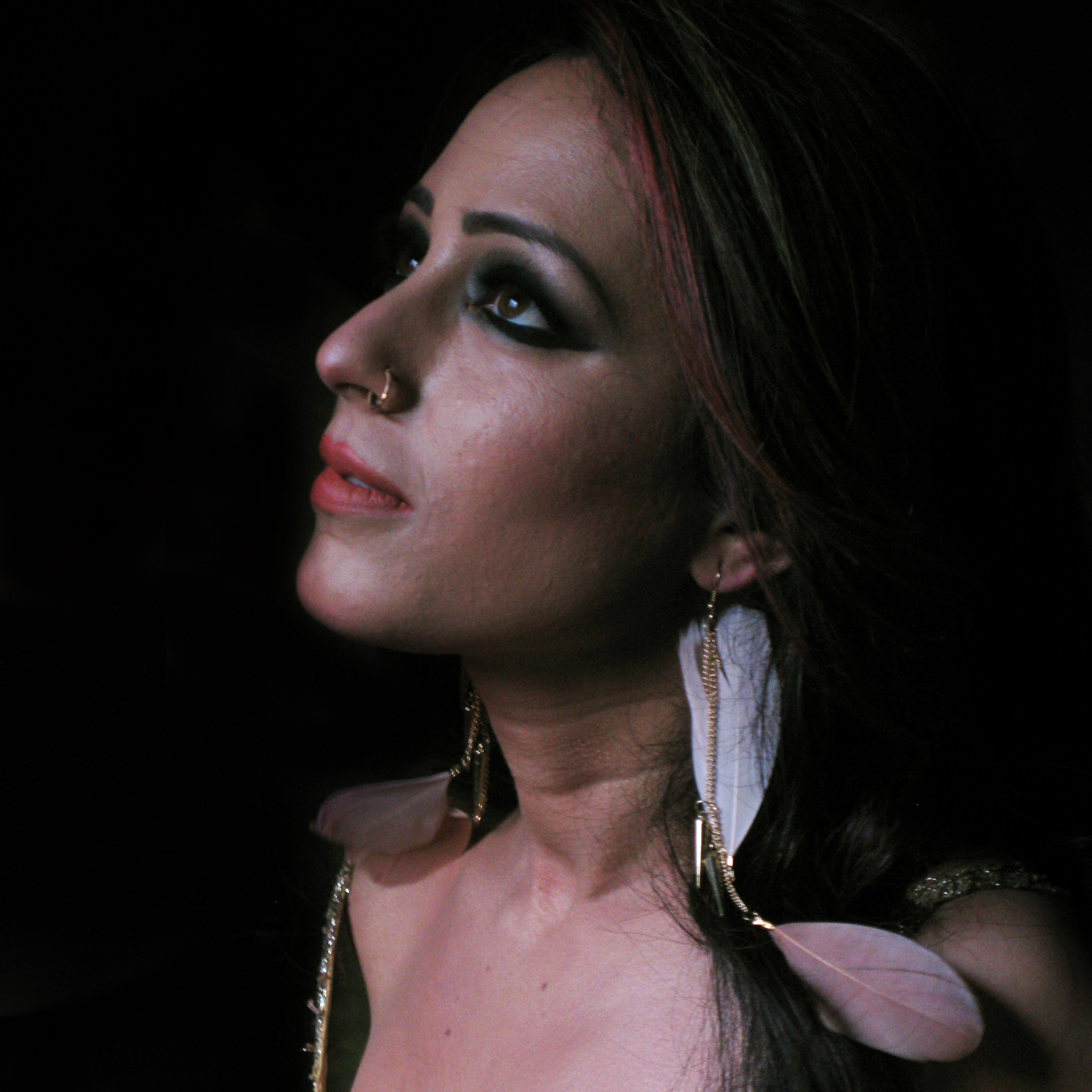
- Kaur, 2015

Background information
- Born: 26 April 1981 (age 45); Kathmandu, Nepal
- Genres: Pop, rock, R&B
- Occupation: Singer
- Instrument: Vocals
- Years active: 1998–present

Preeti Kaur (Nepali: प्रिती कौर; born 26 April 1981) is a Nepalese-Punjabi pop singer. She has released several songs with other artists and also as a solo act. Kaur was named the Best Vocalist at the Shikhar Beat Contest 2003. Her debut song was "Jhan Jhan Badhyo". She launched her Bollywood career with her song "Promises" for the 2014 film Unforgettable. She participated in Startup Weekend Kathmandu on 12–14 September 2014. Her group pitched an idea for natural fertilizer and Waste Management, which was chosen, and the start-up won first prize. In 2015, Kaur released a single, "Belly Dancer".

She competed in the Nepalese national selection Nepal Decides to represent the country at the inaugural Eurovision Song Contest Asia 2026. Performing "Golden Danfe" with rapper Bullet Flo (Suraj Bikram Thapa), the duo placed third.

== Awards and nominations ==
Award	Year	Nominee(s) / Work(s)	Category	Result	Ref.
Image Awards	2005	"Dherai Palta"	Best Vocal Performance Pop (Female)	Won	
