= Udaan (soundtrack) =

Udaank

Soundtrack album by Amit Trivedi
- Released: 18 June 2010
- Genre: Feature film soundtrack
- Length: 26:15
- Language: Hindi
- Label: T-Series
- Producer: Amit Trivedi

Amit Trivedi chronology
| Admissions Open (2010) | Udaank (2010) | Aisha (2010) |

Udaan is the soundtrack album to the 2010 film of the same name directed by Vikramaditya Motwane and produced by Anurag Kashyap Films and UTV Spotboy. The soundtrack featured six songs composed by Amit Trivedi and lyrics written by Amitabh Bhattacharya and Anurag Kashyap. The album was released under the T-Series label on 18 June 2010.

== Background ==
Amit Trivedi composed the film's soundtrack and score with Amitabh Bhattacharya writing the lyrics. The duo previously collaborated together on Aamir (2008) and Dev.D (2009). Two songs were written by Kashyap. Trivedi signed for the film after he liked the script, which Motwane stated "He got exactly what I wanted. I just left him alone after that." The soundtrack blends rock and classical music.

== Critical reception ==
The album received positive responses from critics. Nikhil Taneja of Hindustan Times wrote that "each song in Udaan literally takes flight from a soft, seminal intro, building up to a crescendo of indie, alternative rock", calling the title song "one of the most soul-stirring tracks of this year". Kashmin Fernandes of Mid-Day said that the music and lyrics "run through with the innocent optimism", and called the album an "uplifting gem". Joginder Tuteja of Bollywood Hungama wrote, "Udaan is one of those albums that don't necessarily take a huge start at the music stands. However, the theme flavour of the album means that it should make an impact in the long run, especially if the film goes on to find patronage from audience."

Vipin Nair of Music Aloud rated 8.5 out of 10 and summarized "every composition that Amit does seems to be yet another step he takes towards greatness". Karthik Srinivasan of Milliblog wrote "A knock-out, yet again, from one of India’s most promising composers". Blessy Chettiar of Daily News and Analysis wrote "The film’s soundtrack, with meaningful songs that suit the mood, is moving." Kaveere Bamzai of India Today and Sukanya Verma of Rediff.com also noted and praised Trivedi's score. Sankhayan Ghosh of Film Companion ranked Udaan as one amongst the best albums of the decade.

== Track listing ==
Udaan (Original Motion Picture Soundtrack) track listing
| No. | Title | Lyrics | Singer(s) | Length |
|---|---|---|---|---|
| 1. | "Kahaani (Aankhon Ke Pardon Pe)" | Amitabh Bhattacharya | Joi Barua, Neuman Pinto | 3:31 |
| 2. | "Geet Mein Dhalte Lafzon Mein" | Amitabh Bhattacharya | Amit Trivedi, Amitabh Bhattacharya | 4:55 |
| 3. | "Udaan (Nadi Mein Talab Hai)" | Amitabh Bhattacharya | Amit Trivedi, Joi Barua, Neuman Pinto | 4:58 |
| 4. | "Naav (Chadhti Lehrein Laang Na Paye)" | Anurag Kashyap | Mohan Kannan | 4:12 |
| 5. | "Motumaster (Iski Maa Agar Isse)" | Anurag Kashyap | Raman Mahadevan, Amitabh Bhattacharya, Amit Trivedi, Bonnie Chakraborty, Anurag Kashyap, Kshitij Wagh, Tochi Raina, Shriram Iyer | 5:15 |
| 6. | "Aazaadiyan (Pairon Ki Bediyan)" | Amitabh Bhattacharya | Amit Trivedi, Neuman Pinto, Nikhil D'Souza, Amitabh Bhattacharya | 5:37 |
| 7. | "Theme" | — | Instrumental | 2:47 |
| Total length: | | | | 26:15 |

== Accolades ==
Accolades for Udaan (Original Motion Picture Soundtrack)
| Award | Date of ceremony (Note: Date is linked to the article about the awards held that year, wherever possible.) | Category | Recipients | Result | Ref. |
|---|---|---|---|---|---|
| Filmfare Awards | 29 January 2011 | Best Background Music | Amit Trivedi | Won | |
| Giffoni Film Festival | 9 August 2010 | Best Music Score | Amit Trivedi | Won | |
| Global Indian Music Academy Awards | 30 October 2011 | Best Background Score | Amit Trivedi | Nominated | |
| Mirchi Music Awards | 27 January 2011 | Upcoming Male Vocalist of The Year | Mohan Kannan for "Naav (Chadhti Lehrein Laang Na Paye)" | Nominated | |
