= Aapki Antara =

2009 Indian TV series

- Created by: Monish Sekhri / Drishtant Media pvt ltd
- Written by: Monish Sekhri; Amit Senchoudhary; Koel Chaudhuri
- Directed by: Sanjay Surkar; Dharam Dhiman
- Starring: Zaynah Vastani; Ziyah Vastani; Zaynah Vastani; Raayo S. Bakhirta
- Opening theme: Mahalakshmi Iyer
- Country of origin: India
- Original language: Hindi
- No. of seasons: 1
- No. of episodes: 175

Production
- Producer: Monish Sekhri
- Running time: 27 minutes

Original release
- Network: Zee TV
- Release: 1 June 2009 – 18 February 2010

Aapki Antara (International title: Antara), produced by Drishtant Media, is an Indian soap opera which ran on Zee TV from 1 June 2009 through 18 February 2010 as a social problem drama focusing on the issue of autism.

Initially scheduled to premiere on 25 May 2009, it was postponed and premiered on 1 June 2009.

A Mexican remake of the series, Valentina, mi amor especial, premiered in 2025.

== Plot ==
Aapki Antara is the story of a five-year-old girl named Antara. She is born to Anuradha, who had a relationship out of wedlock with Aditya Verma. When Anuradha dies in a car accident, Antara is orphaned, leaving Aditya with the responsibility of taking his illegitimate daughter home to his wife, Vidya, and son, Abhishek, and raising her as a part of his family.

With Antara in their life, things are not the same again for the Verma family. Antara does not behave like a normal child, being unable to express her emotions and living in her own world. To the outside world, she is a daydreamer and slow child. Eventually, Antara is revealed to be autistic. Both she and her family are faced with the journey of navigating the world and being accepted by the society Antara is brought up in. Through her story, the show guides people to understand the needs of autistic people and handle them with sensitivity.

== Cast ==
- Anjum Farooki as Antara Verma - Aditya and Anuradha's daughter; Vidya's step-daughter; Abhishek's half-sister
  - Aaina Mehta as Teenage Antara
  - Zaynah Vastani as Child Antara
- Darshan Pandya as
  - Aditya Verma - Aarti's brother; Anuradha's ex-lover; Vidya's husband; Antara and Abhishek's father (Dead)
  - Abhishek Verma - Aditya and Vidya's son; Antara's half-brother
    - Sahil Deshmukh Khan as Teenage Abhishek
    - Raj Simaria as Child Abhishek
- Prabhleen Sandhu / Kshitee Jog as Vidya Verma - Aditya's widow; Abhishek's mother; Antara's step-mother
- Rupali Ganguly as Anuradha Rai - Aditya's ex-lover; Antara's mother (Dead)
- Himanshu Malhotra / Prashant Ranyal as Sameer Malhotra - Aditya's friend; Aarti's husband; Mili's adoptive father
- Tulika Upadhyay as Aarti Verma Malhotra - Aditya's sister; Sameer's wife; Mili's adoptive mother
- Apurva Paranjape as Mili Malhotra - Sameer and Aarti's adopted daughter
- Raayo S. Bakhirta as Billu Gupta – Abhishek and Antara's friend
  - Sandeep Upadhyay as Teenage Billu
  - Aarav Velhal as Child Billu
- Nikhil Ratanparkhi as Mr. Gupta - Aditya and Vidya's neighbour; Billu's father
- Alka Mogha as Mrs. Gupta - Aditya and Vidya's neighbour; Billu's mother
- Sujata Kumar as Kiran - Vidya's mother
- Vijay Aidasani as Vidya's father
- Sachin Khurana as Dr. Vikram Saxena - Vidya's childhood friend; Antara's doctor
- Pubali Sanyal as Kaveri Banerjee - Anuradha's friend
