= Naa Girlfriend Baga Rich =

- DVD cover
- Directed by: M. Nagendra Kumar
- Written by: Vemagiri (dialogues)
- Produced by: Kumar Brothers
- Starring: Sivaji; Kaveri Jha; Brahmanandam
- Cinematography: Maro
- Edited by: Upendra
- Music by: Mantra Anand
- Production company: Kumar Brothers Cinema
- Release date: 6 March 2009
- Country: India
- Language: Telugu

Naa Girlfriend Baga Rich (transl. My girlfriend is very rich) is a 2009 Indian Telugu-language romantic thriller film directed by M. Nagendra Kumar and starring Sivaji, Kaveri Jha and Brahmanandam. Although the film is inspired by the American film 8 Heads in a Duffel Bag (1997), it has a different storyline. The film is about the romance between a poor boy and a rich girl.

== Plot ==
Sanjay Sastri falls in love with NRI Sravya in Bangkok. While there, Sanjay mixes up his bag with his co-passenger Mike Tyson, whose bag contains seven heads. How Sanjay proves his innocence to Sravya's family forms the rest of the plot.

== Cast ==
- Sivaji as Sanjay Sastri
- Kaveri Jha as Sravya
- Brahmanandam as Mike Tyson
- Vijay as Sanjay's friend
- Kamal as Sanjay's friend
- Ahuti Prasad as Sravya's father
- Tulasi as Sravya's mother
- Babloo
- Gundu Hanumantha Rao as Flight passenger
- Ramaprabha
- Allari Subhashini

== Production ==
The film was shot in Mauritius for twenty days.

== Music ==
The soundtrack for the film was composed by Mantra Anand.

Track listing
No.	Title	Lyrics	Singer(s)	Length
1.	"Umma Umma"	Noel Sean	Bhargavi Pillai	4:16
2.	"Naalo Chinni Aasalaku"	Bhaskarabhatla	Pranavi, Mantra Anand	4:27
3.	"Rap Song (Ryap)"	Noel Sean	Mantra Anand, Noel Sean	2:49
4.	"Kalavaramo Paravasamo"	A. Sreedhar	Deepthi	4:03
5.	"Padipoyade"	Mantra Anand	Sahithi, Mantra Anand	3:10
6.	"Umma (Remix)"	Noel Sean	Bhargavi Pillai, DJ Shawn	5:03
Total length:				23:48

== Reception ==
A critic from The Times of India rated the film one out of five and opined that "The director of the film was under the impression that he can get away with a fun-centric film revolving around a 'weird' plot, but he is sadly mistaken". Jeevi from Idlebrain.com gave the same rating and wrote that "On a whole, NGFBR is a pathetically made film with unappealing content". A critic from 123Telugu also gave the same rating and stated that "The entire film in fact seems to be based on two English movies - "Transporter" and "Welcome". The Tyson character seems to have been etched from Transporter and the romance angle has definitely been copied from Welcome". A critic from Sify gave the film a verdict of "Below Average" and wrote that "The film has nothing to offer. It is neither a complete comedy entertainer nor a suspense movie nor an action film". Deepa Garimella of Full Hyderabad criticised the film and wrote that "In case you do plan to watch this flick, please carry your own garbage bag and keep the theatre clean as no one wants to see your head rolling around".
