= Valentina, mi amor especial =

Mexican telenovela

- Genre: Telenovela
- Based on: Aapki Antara by Monish Sekhri
- Written by: Fernando Martinez; César Sierra; José Manuel Suárez; Abigaíl Truchsess; Nathalia Martinez
- Directed by: Lilo Vilaplana
- Starring: Rebeca Herrera; Cynthia Klitbo; Mauricio Novoa; Macarena Oz; Katie Barberi; Ana Karen Coy; Daniel Medina; Eduardo Villalpando; Michelle Santane; Azucena Evans; Marco Orozco; Édgar Ruvalcaba
- Countries of origin: Mexico; India
- Original language: Spanish
- No. of seasons: 1
- No. of episodes: 60

Production
- Production company: VIP TV 2000

Original release
- Network: Red Uno de Bolivia (Note: De facto premiere. As of October 2026, the series is yet to air on Mexican television.)
- Release: 3 April 2025 – 2025

Valentina, mi amor especial (English title: Valentina, My Special Love) is a 2025 Mexican telenovela co-produced by Mexican production company VIP TV 2000 and Indian company ZEE International. The series is adapted from Zee TV's 2009 production Aapki Antara, which is about a girl with autism who becomes a tech genius.

== Plot ==
Valentina (Rebeca Herrera) grew up isolated from the rest of the world, living with her adopted mother in the village of Chiquilistlán, where she excelled academically. After her mother's death, she moves to Guadalajara in order to pursue better goals, but also faces challenges. She forms new relations, but has to face problems with those who reject her.

== Cast ==
- Rebeca Herrera as Valentina Kumar
- Daniel Medina as Eric Altamirano
- Cynthia Klitbo as Aruna Kumar (Valentina's mother)
- Mauricio Novoa as Santiago Altamirano
- Katie Barberi as Isabela Altamirano
- Edgar Ruvalcaba as Federico Torres
- Macarena Oz as Rosa Monsalve
- Dario Rocas as Willy González
- Michelle Santané as Patricia Mendoza
- Ana Karen Coy as Susana Aguirre
- Marco Orozco as Pacho Morena
- Eduardo Villalpando as Lucio Rodríguez
- Oswaldo Rada as Florencio Gutierrez
- Marimer Espinoza as Lirio Cantoral
- Jessy Higuera as Aretha Guerrero
- Azucena Evans as Elena Cardona
- Andy Alducín as Fabiola Salvatierra
- Gerardo Arana as Mauricio Cardona
- Adal Cotero as Ramón Cardona
- Alejandro Aldama as Jonás Meléndez
- Mellé Balanzá as Ariana Pineda
- Arnulfo Reyes Sánchez as Detective Peraza
- Agustín Arana as Augusto Mendoza
- Edu Esquivel as Cristian Casadiego
- Carlos Cosío as Julio Mendoza
- Carlos Ernesto Castañón as Teo
- Sara Isabel Quintero as the school director

== Production ==
VIP 2000 TV and ZEE announced on 23 April 2024 that they would begin working on a co-production, adapted from Aapki Antara. This enabled ZEE to produce a telenovela in Mexico for the first time, with Mexican actors and high production values. ZEE Content After Valentina, the company will likely find new partners in Latin America to film local productions. Its cast includes talents from Mexico City and Guadalajara. The series is filmed entirely in the state of Jalisco, mainly in natural environments, including a ranch which serves as a central part of the story.

Filming of the series began in Chiquilistlán in July 2024. It is also the first with Mauricio Novoa to be filmed in Mexico, as he had produced several telenovelas with Telemundo in the United States since 2017.

== Broadcast ==
In November 2024, after the completion of the filming, the series was sold to TVN in Panama and Panamericana in Peru.

The first channel to premiere the series was Bolivia's Red Uno on April 3, 2025. On May 6, 2025, it premiered on TC Televisión in Ecuador and on May 12, on Panamericana. On July 30, the series arrived to Televen in Venezuela, On february 25, 2026 the series arrived to TVN Panamá. As of November 2025, the series is yet to premiere in Mexico.
