= Khel Toh Ab Shuru Hoga =

- Theatrical release poster
- Directed by: Kunal V Singh
- Story by: Kunal V Singh
- Produced by: Mahesh Narula, Vikas Phadnis
- Starring: Ruslaan Mumtaz; Devshi Khanduri; Rohit Pathak
- Cinematography: Shrikant Pattnaik
- Edited by: Lav Singh; Shankar Samant
- Music by: Deepak Agrawal; Ashfaque; Nayan Goswami; AARV; Ricky Mishra
- Production companies: Gmd Films; Theatre King
- Distributed by: Lav Singh
- Release date: 13 May 2016
- Country: India
- Language: Hindi

Khel Toh Ab Shuru Hoga (transl. The game starts now) is a 2016 Bollywood action film directed by Kunal Singh and produced by Mahesh Narula. The film's story is about a bank robbery in which actor Ruslaan Mumtaz plays the role of a bank security guard, who ultimately robs the bank. The film was released on 13 May 2016.

== Cast ==
Actress Devshi Khanduri is playing the character of a Muslim girl. Actor Rohit Pathak is playing negative role in the film.

- Ruslaan Mumtaz as Abbas, bank security guard
- Devshi Khanduri as Zara, a Muslim girl
- Rohit Pathak as negative lead
- Khushi Sharma in a negative role
- Susheel Parashar
- Hazel Crowney as item number "«

== Soundtrack ==
The Music Was Composed By Ashfaque - Nayan Goswami, Ricky Mishra, Aarv, Deepak Agrawal and Released by T-Series.

Khel Toh Ab Shuru Hoga

Soundtrack album by Ashfaque - Nayan Goswami, Ricky Mishra, Aarv, Deepak Agrawal
- Released: 28 Feb, 2010
- Recorded: 2010
- Genre: Soundtrack
- Length: 21:30
- Label: T-Series
- Producers: Ashfaque - Nayan Goswami, Ricky Mishra, Aarv, Deepak Agrawal

Track list
| No. | Title | Lyrics | Music | Singer(s) | Length |
|---|---|---|---|---|---|
| 1. | "Mujhe Tu Jo Mila" | Abhendra Kumar Upadhyay | Ashfaque - Nayan Goswami | Aman Trikha | 4:58 |
| 2. | "Dono Aankho Ka Shutter" | Abhendra Kumar Upadhyay | Ashfaque-Nayan Goswami | Kalpana Patowary | 3:35 |
| 3. | "Danka Bajega" | Abhendra Kumar Upadhyay | Ricky Mishra | Aman Trikha | 4:20 |
| 4. | "Khel To Abb Shuru Hoga" | Deepak Agrawal | Aarv, Deepak Agrawal | Shahid Mallya, Promita Datta | 4:11 |
| 5. | "Tu Gham Pehan Ke (Sad)" | Abhendra Kumar Upadhyay | Ashfaque - Nayan Goswami | Altamash Faridi | 4:26 |
| Total length: | | | | | 21:30 |

== Production ==
The film is produced by Delhi-based businessman Mahesh Narula under the production house GMD films. Vikas Phadnis is the Executive Producer of the film.
