= Yedyanchi Jatra =

- Directed by: Milind Arun Kavde
- Written by: Milind Arun Kavde
- Screenplay by: Milind Arun Kavde
- Starring: Bharat Jadhav; Mohan Joshi; Vinay Apte
- Cinematography: Samalabhasker
- Edited by: Vijay Khochikar
- Music by: Kshitij Wagh
- Release date: 3 February 2012
- Country: India
- Language: Marathi

Yedyanchi Jatra is a Marathi film released in India on 3 February 2012.

== Plot ==
Harya dreams of leaving his small village, but promises his grandfather on his deathbed that he will stay and take care of the family farm. He comes up with a scheme to settle the problem of where to put nightsoil. Meanwhile, landlord Bhangade Patil plots to take over his land.

== Cast ==
- Bharat Jadhav as Harya
- Vinay Apte as Kadu Anna Patil
- Mohan Joshi as Bhangade Patil
- Mahesh Raut as Mohan
- Vishakha Subhedar as Anna Patil's wife
- Monika Pandit as Rani
- Sneha Kulkarni as Sangi
- Pandharinath Kamble as Nayanrao
- Shweta Tiwari in an item number by Saroj Khan

== Soundtrack ==
Yedyanchi Jatra

Soundtrack album by Kshitij Wagh, Sachin Pandit
- Released: 30 January 2012
- Genre: Film soundtrack

The music is composed by Kshitij Wagh and lyrics by Guru Thakur.

=== Track list ===
No.	Title	Music	Singer(s)	Length
1.	"Saanj Gandhalali"	Kshitij Wagh	Amruta Natu, Kshitij Wagh
2.	"Kaata Rutla"	Kshitij Wagh	Shreya Ghoshal
3.	"Yedyanchi Jatra"	Kshitij Wagh	Kshitij Wagh
4.	"Uthale Vadal"		Shankar Mahadevan, Mahesh Raut
