= Kehta Hai Dil Jee Le Zara =

- Genre: Drama romance
- Screenplay by: Anjum Abbas
- Story by: Niranjan Iyengar; Damini K Shetty; Anantika Sahir
- Directed by: Sidharth Sen Gupta; Mohit Hussain; Saagar Kagra
- Creative directors: Bhavna Sharma; Shivani Gujrati; Sheetal Kolvalkar Khan
- Starring: See below
- Voices of: Bharat Hans; Saurabh Malhotra
- Theme music composer: Bharat Hans; Saurabh Malhotra
- Opening theme: "Kehta Hai Dil Jee Le Zara"
- Country of origin: India
- Original language: Hindi
- No. of seasons: 01
- No. of episodes: 167

Production
- Executive producers: Arun Tiwari; Samir Shaikh
- Producers: Shrishti Arya; Goldie Behl
- Production locations: Panchgani; Mumbai
- Editors: Vishnu Pandey; Mukesh Mandloi
- Camera setup: Multi-camera
- Running time: Approx. 29 minutes (1st episode), 32 minutes (episodes 22–29), 20–22 minutes otherwise
- Production company: Rose Audio Visuals

Original release
- Network: Sony Entertainment Television (India)
- Release: 15 August 2013 – 8 May 2014

Kehta Hai Dil Jee Le Zara (transl. The Heart Says Live a Little) is a Hindi-language Indian drama television series which premiered on Sony TV on 15 August 2013. The series starred Sangita Ghosh and Ruslaan Mumtaz.

The series was dubbed into Tamil as Kadhal Mayam and broadcast on Polimer TV.

== Plot summary ==
The story revolves around the life of 34-year-old women, Sanchi Prabhu, who struggles to manage her deceased father's strawberry farm in Panchgani, secure the futures of her two younger siblings and care for her grandmothers. Dhruv Goyal, a 27-year-old, charming, wealthy lawyer, arrives on holiday from Mumbai and stays with Sanchi's neighbour. Sanchi initially finds Dhruv irritating but they later become friends. Dhruv realizes he loves Sanchi during her sister Prachi's marriage. However, Prachi's uncle-by-marriage seeks to marry Sanchi. This engagement is avoided when Dhruv reveals the uncle's bad intentions.

Sanchi's elder brother, Pradeep, files a lawsuit for control of the farm, which he wants to sell to an industrialist. Dhruv tries to console her but inadvertently confesses his love. Sanchi becomes upset, fearing another man is trying to take advantage of her. Dhruv tries to convince Sanchi that she loves him, but becomes frustrated at her refusals. Only when he sets to return to Mumbai does Sanchi stop him and confess her love. They share romantic moments before her family break them apart, and try to marry Sanchi to a fifty-year-old man. Dhruv becomes enraged with how Sanchi is treated and gets into a fight over her honour, moving her to stand with him.

The next threat to their future comes from Dhruv's family, as his mother schemes to marry him to his childhood friend, Ankita. Sanchi becomes jealous, though Dhruv insists he loves only her. When Ankita learns of their relationship, she tells Sanchi that Dhruv had several ex-girlfriends, and Sanchi fears that Dhruv might leave her. Dhruv is upset she would think this, but Sanchi makes up with him.

Dhruv is called to meet with the industrialist, who turns out to be his older brother. It turns out that Dhruv is a silent partner in the company buying the farm. He is unable to explain the situation and, feeling betrayed, Sanchi calls-off their engagement. Dhruv tries to convince his father to stop the sale and accept Sanchi as his bride, but his father instead tries to buy-off Sanchi with ₹20 crore and the farm if she will leave Dhruv forever. Sanchi refuses; and the father apologizes, saying it was a test. However, at a family dinner, Dhruv's mother tells Sanchi that their marriage will create a rift between Dhruv and his brother, tearing their family apart; she asks Sanchi to leave Dhruv forever.

Sanchi capitulates and accepts ₹25 crore from Dhruv's father, telling Dhruv nothing as she leaves for Panchgani. Dhruv calls Sanchi demanding the truth, and she claims that after seeing the cheque she could not stop herself from taking it. Dhruv cannot hide his disappointment as he disconnects the call. But then Dhruv learns that Sanchi had not encashed the cheque and had done all this on his mother's insistence and therefore he apologizes to Sanchi for not trusting her and marries her. After marrying they have a blast on their honeymoon in Goa and spend quality time with each other. Later the couple shift to Dhruv's house in Mumbai. Everyone in the family except dhruv's father and his sister-in-law, Suparna, accept their marriage.

Suparna instigates her sister Ankita against Sanchi into believing that Sanchi is the reason why she was not able to marry Dhruv. Both the sisters create various hurdles for Sanchi but all go in vain. Finally on the night of Dhruv's niece, Shruti's birthday, Sanchi exposes Ankita and she is thrown out of the Goyal house. This angers Suparna who vows revenge on Sanchi. Advait comes to goyal house for his studies after Dhruv's suggestion but due to the rude behaviour of Goyal's towards him and wrong allegations charged against him he leaves the goyal house. Sanchi's sister Prachi suffers miscarriage and is thrown out of the house. Dhruv brings Prachi to his house and upon checkup the doctor reveals that Prachi can conceive and there are no compilations in her case however as doctor said that it becomes a bit difficult for women to conceive after they cross age of 30, Sanchi doubts her conceiving chances and wants to start a family with Dhruv before it is too late.

Prachi soon reconcile with her husband Sunil. On the other hand, Dhruv however feels that it is too early for him to take father's responsibility and condemns Sanchi's proposal. But Sanchi is determined to go family way. After various arguments finally Dhruv agrees to have kids. Sanchi has conceived naturally but Suparna changes Sanchi's reports with fake reports and as a result doctor tells Sanchi that she is infertile. Sanchi and Dhruv are heartbroken. Suparna instigates Dhruv's mother, Neena against Sanchi. Neena tells Sanchi to leave the house as she has now become a curse for Dhruv as she can never give him and his family the happiness they want. Dhruv however supports Sanchi. Sanchi asks for six days from Neena and tells her that in these six days she'll prove her that she is suitable partner for Dhruv. Suparna tries to terminate Sanchi's pregnancy through various means but all goes in vain. At last Sanchi falls from the stairs as planned by Suparna. The doctor reveals that Sanchi will be fine and the news of Sanchi being eight weeks pregnant shocks the whole family. Dhruv catches Suparna trying to burn Sanchi's pregnancy reports. Dhruv and the whole family insult Suparna on doing such shameless act. Sanchi also gets to know about Suparna's act. Suparna asks for forgiveness from Sanchi. Sanchi doesn't want to forgive Suparna but gives her a last chance to correct her mistakes. Later Sanchi and Dhruv share some romantic moments. As the months pass by Sanchi delivers twin babies. The whole family comes together for celebration and the show ends on a happy note.

== Cast ==
=== Main ===
- Sangeeta Ghosh as Sanchi Prabhu / Sanchi Dhruv Goyal
- Ruslaan Mumtaz as Dhruv Goyal aka DV

=== Supporting ===
- Mahru Sheikh as Neena Yashvardhan Goyal
- Rushad Rana as Anvay Goyal
- Amit Behl as Yashvardhan Goyal
- Anuj Khurana as Arvind Sahay
- Vivana Singh as Suparna Anvay Goyal
- Meenakshi Sethi as Suman
- Sulabha Deshpande as Aaji
- Delnaaz Irani as Dilshad
- Vishnu Bholwani as Pradeep Prabhu
- Priyanka Sidana as Prachi Prabhu / Prachi Sunil Agarwal
- Nabeel Ahmed as Advait Prabhu
- Ashcharya Shetty as Deepali Pradeep Prabhu
- Vinay Jain as Rishi
- Vishal Nayak as Shivam
- Gaurav Bajpai as Sunil Agarwal
- Hunar Hali as Ankita
- Jitendra Bohra as Vishwas

== Production ==
The show had one crossover episode with Bade Achhe Lagte Hain on 6 December 2013.

== Reception ==
The Indian Express rated two stars and reviewed, "Jee Le Zara has all the right elements — the smart sets, the wardrobe, the middle-class lifestyle, even the actors — but its heart is somehow misplaced in the drama dye. As cool as the concept sounds, the show is playing to the gallery, pandering to popular culture with long pregnant pauses, silly facial expressions, that funny ringtone of a background score and needless exaggeration."
