= Jeena Hai Toh Thok Daal =

- Directed by: Manish Vatsalya
- Screenplay by: Saurabh Choudhary
- Produced by: Aparna Hoshing
- Starring: Ravi Kishen; Yashpal Sharma; Rahul Kumar; Manish Vatsalya; Hazel Crowney
- Cinematography: Neelaabh Kaul
- Edited by: Nipun Ashok Gupta
- Music by: Shadaab - Abhik; Siddhant Madhav
- Release date: 14 September 2012
- Country: India
- Language: Hindi

Jeena Hai Toh Thok Daal (transl. Shoot if you want to live) is a 2012 Indian Hindi-language action crime film directed by Manish Vatsalya, starring Ravi Kishen, Yashpal Sharma, Rahul Kumar, Manish Vatsalya and Hazel Crowney.

The movie is a hard-hitting gangster movie that shows the horrid realities of underworld crime and the changing times of Bihar state. The film was released on 14 September 2012 and was written off as a box office disaster in the very first week.

== Plot ==
The story unfolds in the crime-infested underbelly of Purnea, a small town in Bihar, where four mercenaries of different ages share a life steeped in lawlessness:

- Chandrabhan (Ravi Kishan), the pragmatic leader.
- Atka (Manish Vatsalya), who also directed the film.
- Mahkoo (Yashpal Sharma), a hardened criminal.
- Bitwa (Rahul Kumar), the youngest of the group.

Initially, they survive through petty crimes like pickpocketing and local robberies. Their fortunes shift when they are offered a lucrative contract: the assassination of Shrishti (Hazel Crowney), daughter of media tycoon Pawar (Govind Namdeo). Pawar’s fearless journalism has long exposed the illegal empire of Rana (Sharat Saxena), a ruthless criminal determined to exact revenge. To keep his own hands clean, Rana enlists corrupt police officer Hanumant Singh (Murali Sharma), who passes the job to the four outlaws.

The gang travels to Mumbai, the “city of dreams,” to carry out the hit. But fate intervenes when Chandrabhan encounters Shrishti in public, witnessing her compassion as she feeds the poor. Struck by her virtue and beauty, he experiences a profound moral conflict. During their first attempt, Chandrabhan cannot bring himself to pull the trigger, and the plan collapses. To get closer to their target, the men infiltrate Pawar’s household by posing as Shrishti’s personal bodyguards.

Living under the same roof, Chandrabhan’s conscience and growing affection for Shrishti transform him. He shifts from plotting her death to vowing to protect her. His change of heart, however, fractures the gang. Mahkoo and Atka, driven by greed and fear of the underworld, insist on completing the contract. With Hanumant Singh and Rana’s syndicate exerting pressure, tensions escalate into violence.

The climax erupts in a brutal showdown, as Chandrabhan defies his criminal allies and turns against the network he once served. The narrative culminates in a bloody conflict where redemption, loyalty, and survival collide, leaving behind the devastating consequences of their choices.

== Cast ==
- Ravi Kishen as Chandrabhan
- Yashpal Sharma as Mahkoo
- Rahul Kumar as Bitwa.
- Manish Vatsalya as Atka
- Hazel Crowney as Shrishti
- Pooja Welling as Mudra
- Sharat Saxena as Rana
- Murli Sharma as Hanumant Singh
- Ashwini Kalsekar as I. G.

== Controversy ==
The controversial subject matter of Jeena Hai Toh Thok Daal, together with the song from it titled "Mooh Mein Le", provoked a reaction from Shiv Sena.

== Soundtrack ==
The official soundtrack of the 2012 Bollywood crime-drama Jeena Hai Toh Thok Daal comprises seven tracks, composed by Siddhant Madhav along with the duo Shadaab-Abhik. Released under the T-Series label, the album offers a mix of pulsating item numbers, rock-driven title themes, and soulful romantic ballads.

Sr.	Title	Singers
1	Palang Tod Hai Tere Jawani	Siddhant Madhav, Saberi Bhattacharya, Manish Vatsalaya, Shadab Faridi
2	Tees Uthee Dil Mein	Kailash Kher
3	Ankhiya Mila Ke Channa	Siddhant Madhav
4	Jeena Hai Toh Thok Daal (Title Track)	Shaadab (Shadaab Hashmi)
5	Kahiya Se Jogali Gullackwa	Parshuram Mishra, Siddhant Madhav, Manish Vatsalaya
6	Palang Tod Hai Tere Jawani (Remix)	Siddhant Madhav, Saberi Bhattacharya, Manish Vatsalaya
7	Ankhiya Mila Ke Channa (Unplugged)	Siddhant Madhav

== Reception ==
Critically, the movie received negative reviews. Mid-Day rated it as 0.5; The Times of India and Daily Bhaskar also did the same.

It was also a box office disaster.
