= Bhale Mogudu Bhale Pellam =

Bhale Pellam Bhale Mogudu
- Film poster
- Directed by: Dinesh Baboo
- Screenplay by: Dinesh Baboo; Vemuri Satyanarayana
- Story by: Dinesh Baboo
- Produced by: Jonnada Ramana Murthy
- Starring: Rajendra Prasad; Suhasini; Kaveri Jha
- Narrated by: Tanikella Bharani
- Cinematography: Dinesh Baboo
- Edited by: Murali-Ramayya
- Music by: E. S. Murthy
- Production company: Usha Charan Creations
- Release date: 25 February 2011
- Country: India
- Language: Telugu

Bhale Mogudu Bhale Pellam (transl. What a Husband! What a Wife!) is a 2011 Telugu-language comedy film, produced by Jonnada Ramana Murthy on Usha Charan Creations banner and directed by Dinesh Babu. Starring Rajendra Prasad, Suhasini, Kaveri Jha and music composed by E. S. Murthy. The film is remake of Kannada film Eradane Maduve (2011).

== Cast ==
- Rajendra Prasad as Venkat
- Suhasini as Madhavi
- Kaveri Jha as Veena
- Naresh as Advocate Murthy
- Raghu Babu as Bujji
- Harsha Vardhan as Dr.Ramesh
- Jhansi as Maid Radha Bai
- Rajitha as Hema
- Shilpa
- Ramya Sri as Ramya
