= Sahil Deshmukh Khan =

Indian tv actor working in Hindi Serials

- Born: Sahil Deshmukh Khan; 4 December 1997 (age 28); India
- Occupation: TV Actor
- Years active: 2009–2013

Sahil Deshmukh Khan (born 4 December 1997) is an Indian tv actor working in Hindi Serials. He started his tv carrier from Zee Tv serial Aapki Antara as Abhishek. He acted in Bharat Ka Veer Putra Maharana Pratap as "Young Akbar" but had to leave the show as he was diagnosed with leukemia.

== Television ==
Year	Serial	Role
2009	Aapki Antara	Abhishek
2009	Ninja Pandav	Nakul
2010	Veer Shivaji	
2013	Bharat Ka Veer Putra – Maharana Pratap	Young Akbar
