= Alaxmi Ka Super Parivaar =

- Image Of Alaxmi Ka Super Parivaar
- Written by: Shilpa Choube; Susheel Choube; Mamta Kashyap; Rajat Vyas
- Directed by: Ashish Khurana; Divyesh Pathak
- Starring: See below
- Country of origin: India
- Original language: Hindi
- No. of seasons: 1
- No. of episodes: 96

Production
- Producers: Jamnadas Majethia; Aatish Kapadia
- Camera setup: 576i
- Running time: approx. 20+ minutes
- Production company: Hats Off Productions

Original release
- Network: Life OK
- Release: 2 July 2012 – 26 January 2013

Alaxmi Ka Super Parivaar, formerly known as Alaxmi – Hamari Super Bahu, is a family comedy-drama which aired on Life OK. It is based on the Bengali serial, Sansaar Sukher Hoy Romonir Guney, that aired on Star Jalsa. It starred Helly Shah and Sujay Reu.

== Plot ==
Set in the holy city of Dwarka–it is believed that the city will sink if the Kapadia family in the city does not stop fighting.

The head of the Kapadia family is a man called Natwarlal. His younger brother Mohandas has three sons and three daughters-in-law living with him. The women in the house are constantly fighting amongst themselves and making the men compete and fight. Mohandas has grandchildren also who do not fight amongst themselves but constantly get caught in the crossfire. Natwarlal just wants to abandon the family and lead a peaceful family life elsewhere but Mohandas believes it is his duty to look after his children and grandchildren.

The brothers have split their father's transport business into three setups and fight over clients and cut into each other's business. The elder brother Ram, had been in the lockup for a few days. Instead of helping their brother they had chosen to split the business. The brothers are also suspicious of each other because the 99-year lease to this house had been renewed but has gone missing.

Mohandas's wife Shantiben died twenty two years ago. Post her death he chose the spouses for his three children and rues the days when he made the choice. Although Shantiben is dead and gone to the whole world she loves her husband so much that she still comes and talks to her husband through her photographs and advises him to establish a long holding peace in the house. For bringing prosperity to the house, she believes an antidote is required and the antidote to prosperity is misfortune. She tells him that he will find the antidote once he gets an invitation. Mohandas wonders where the invitation will come from.

Twenty kilometres away from this is a village called Sajjan where an orphan girl lives with her Mama and Mami. Her name is Laxmi but the whole world calls her Alaxmi. Her Mami is very cruel to her and so are two of her cousins but her Mama and one cousin love and care for her. Alaxmi is the leader of the children in the village and she is very friendly with a girl called Mini who is of the same age. It so happens that Mini is set to be married off and the invitation for the same reaches Mohan Das. How? Mini's father is good friend of Mohandas and this is how he gets the invitation.

Mohandas and Natwarlal are somehow reluctant to take the whole bickering family along so they just take along the eldest son's younger son–Kishan along with him to the wedding. At the wedding Mohandas meets and starts observing the antics of Laxmi. He starts to believe that she can set his household right. To top it all she is literally named Alaxmi and she will definitely prove to be the antidote to the constant strife in his house. He realises that Laxmi never cries in the face of adversity and has practical solutions for every problem and therefore she can take care of herself in Kargil.

Kishan wants to study Fashion Design in Ahmedabad at NIID and for this he needs money which his parents are not willing to give him because they don't think it is worth paying for their son's Tailoring Training. Mohandas promises Kishan that he will pay for his education if he agrees to marry Laxmi and send him to Ahmedabad.

Laxmi is married off to Kishan and Kishan finds it difficult to tolerate the antics of his childwoman bride because she refuses to behave like a traditional bahu. But Laxmi is the perfect antidote to problems of this household and she starts setting things right in her own style and not in a preachy manner.

Laxmi realises that it is the split in the business that is at the core of the discord and she makes them realise that they can run a much better business if they get together and become each other's strength. She also stops them from being evicted from the house by finding the lease papers. She does much to help them arrive at total peace. While Laxmi solves the problems of others and turns them into friends.

== Cast ==
Character	Played by	Role
Alakshmi / Laxmi Kishan Kapadia	Helly Shah	Kishan's wife
Kishan Kapadia	Sujay Reu	Laxmi's husband
Mini	Mehendi Jain	Alakshmi's friend
Hiral	Sonal Vengurlekar	Kishan's friend
Pihu	Roshni Parekh	Alakshmi's cousin
Mohandas Kapadia	Raman Kumar	Grandfather of Kishan
Shanti Mohandas Kapadia	Supriya Pathak	Wife of Mohandas
Natwarlal Kapadia	Anang Desai	Elder brother of Mohandas
Gattu	Deven Bhojani	Nephew of Natwarlal & Mohandas
Ram Mohandas Kapadia	Sunil Vishrani	Elder son of Mohandas, Father of Kishan
Neelam Ram Kapadia	Purvi Vyas	Wife of Ram, Mother of Kishan
Bharat Mohandas Kapadia	Ujjwal Chopra	Second son of Mohandas
Heera Bharat Kapadia	Priyamvada Sawant	Wife of Bharat
Anushka Bharat Kapadia	Barbie Jain	Daughter of Heera and Bharat
Laxman Mohandas Kapadia	Karan Mehta	Youngest son of Mohandas
Panna Laxman Kapadia	Disha Savla	Wife of Lakshman
Tina Laxman Kapadia	Ziyah Vastani	Daughter of Lakshman and Panna
Tinku Laxman Kapadia	Zaynah Vastani	Daughter of Lakshman and Panna
