= A Flat (film) =

- Promotional poster
- Directed by: Hemant Madhukar
- Written by: Ajay Monga, Hemant Madhukar
- Produced by: Anjum Rizvi
- Starring: Jimmy Sheirgill; Sanjay Suri; Kaveri Jha; Aindrita Ray; Hazel Crowney; Sachin Khedekar; Nassar Abdulla; Saurabh Dubey
- Cinematography: Manoj Shaw
- Edited by: Bunty Nagi
- Music by: Songs: Bappi Lahiri; Background Score: Raju Singh
- Production companies: Anjum Rizvi Film Company; Y.T Entertainment Ltd
- Release date: 12 November 2010
- Running time: 96 minutes
- Country: India
- Language: Hindi

A Flat is a 2010 Indian Hindi-language horror film directed by Hemant Madhukar and produced by Anjum Rizvi. Starring Jimmy Sheirgill, Sanjay Suri, Kaveri Jha, Aindrita Ray, Hazel Crowney and Sachin Khedekar, the film follows a young businessman who returns from the U.S. to reconcile with his girlfriend. However, he soon finds himself trapped in a haunted apartment following his father's mysterious death and his girlfriend's disappearance.

The film was released on 12 November 2010 under the Anjum Rizvi Film Company and Y.T Entertainment Ltd. banners. Opening on 175 screens, the film bombed at the box office.

== Plot ==
The story follows Rahul (Jimmy Sheirgill), a young businessman who comes back from the U.S. to patch things up with his girlfriend Preeti (Kaveri Jha). His father, Varma (Sachin Khedekar) is mysteriously murdered as he goes to find a flat for Rahul. His friend Karan (Sanjay Suri), a rich salesman, gives his old flat to Rahul. After Rahul enters the flat, his life takes an unexpected turn when the unexplainable disappearance of Preeti takes place, and finally Rahul finds himself trapped in his own flat. With no connection to the outside world, Rahul is stuck and realises that a ghost is living in the flat with him, who won't let him go. He tries to contact Karan, but is unsuccessful. He then finds a diary in his room, which is opened by the ghost who allows him to read it.

It turns out the diary belongs to Geethika (Hazel Crowney), a young village girl living out her childhood even at an adult age. She finds Karan coming to her village to build many buildings, and Karan uses Geethika's father's help. When her father cancels it of due to the suicide of her sister, Karan can't take the loss, and runs away with Geethika pretending to be in love with her. Back in a flashback, it is shown the two coming to foreign and getting married in the same flat Rahul is living in. Karan explains that he will return in a few days, but doesn't come back until many months. In his absence, Varma visits Geethika and takes advantage and tries to rape her. She uses self-defence, and tells him to get out. She begins to cry, only to realise she is pregnant. Karan comes back, and tells her to abort the baby because he is already married to someone else. She dies during the abortion, and Karan hides her body so nobody would blame him for her death.

The diary ends, and Rahul investigates that the ghost is Geethika's, and it wants revenge on Karan. Firstly Rahul refuses, though when severely attacked several times, he agrees. He calls Karan over, and tells him everything. He gives the flat keys back, and walks out, and looking back, Karan is now trapped in the flat with no way of getting out. Rahul walks out of the building, and looks at the window, only to see Geethika's ghost approaching Karan, and the curtains closing with Karan shouting for help. Rahul now realises that except for Geethika's revenge, the ghost's appearance had another meaning, for him to sort out his love life with Preeti. He rings Preeti, and apologises about every mistake he did, the two make-up and get married.

== Cast ==
- Jimmy Sheirgill as Rahul Varma
- Sanjay Suri as Karan
- Hazel Crowney as Geethika Singh
- Kaveri Jha as Preeti Rastogi
- Sachin Khedekar as Varma
- Aindritha Ray as Karan's Wife
- Naseer Abdullah as Digvijay Singh
- Satwant Kaur as Mrs Digvijay Singh
- Saurabh Dubey as Ajay Rastogi

== Soundtrack ==
The music was composed By Bappi Lahiri and released by T-Series. All lyrics were written by Virag Mishra.

A Flat

Soundtrack album by Bappa Lahiri
- Released: 20 Sep 2010
- Recorded: 2010
- Genre: Soundtrack
- Length: 39:05
- Label: T-Series
- Producer: Bappi Lahiri

Track list
No.	Title	Singer(s)	Length
1.	"Meetha Sa"	Kailash Kher, Suzanne D'Mello	6:38
2.	"Dil Kashi"	Sonu Nigam, Tulsi Kumar, Raja Hasan, Aditi Singh Sharma	5:49
3.	"Chal Halke"	Sunidhi Chauhan, Raja Hasan, Bappi Lahiri	5:08
4.	"Pyar Itna Na Kar"	Shreya Ghoshal	4:58
5.	"Meetha Sa" (Unplugged)	Kailash Kher, Suzanne D'Mello	5:29
6.	"Dil Kashi" (2)	Sonu Nigam, Raja Hasan, Aditi Singh Sharma	5:49
7.	"Meetha Sa" (Partymap Mix)	Kailash Kher, Suzanne D'Mello	5:14
Total length:			39:05

== Reception ==
Comparing the film unfavourably to Kudrat and Bhoot, Taran Adarsh from Bollywood Hungama gave the film one star out of five, feeling the subject lacked novelty, the film relied on horror clichés and also suffered due to miscasting. However, he praised Sheirgill's performance.
