= Nepal in the Eurovision Song Contest Asia =

Nepal in the Eurovision Song Contest Asia 2026
- Eurovision Song Contest Asia 2026
- Participating broadcaster: Himalaya Television (Himalaya TV)
- Country: Nepal
- Selection process: Nepal Decides
- Selection date: 7 October 2026

Competing entry
- Song: "Ananta maya"
- Artist: Pratik Himal Rai
- Songwriter: Pratik Himal Rai

Placement
- Final result: 9th, 69 points

Participation chronology

Nepal was represented at the Eurovision Song Contest Asia 2026 with the song "Ananta maya", written and performed by Pratik Himal Rai. The Nepalese participating broadcaster, Himalaya Television (Himalaya TV), selected its entry for the contest through a national final.

== Background ==
On 31 March 2026, alongside the official announcement of the Eurovision Song Contest Asia 2026, Nepali broadcaster Himalaya Television (Himalaya TV) was announced as one of provisional participants in the first Eurovision Song Contest Asia, representing Nepal.

== Before Eurovision Asia ==
Nepal Decides logo

Himalaya TV selected its entry by organising a national selection show produced by Saujanya Media. Executive Director Shyam Kandel stated that they would start auditioning the week after the announcement to find the act that is going to represent Nepal in Bangkok in November. On 4 August, it was announced that Himalaya TV would select its entry through Nepal Decides. It was initially scheduled to be held on 19 September, but was later pushed back to 7 October in the wake of the 2026 Nepal–Tibet floods.

=== Competing acts ===
On 18 September 2026, the eleven competing artists were announced. On 23 September, the songs were released.

Nepal Decides participants
Artist	Song	Songwriters
Allam Aadesh	"Byakta" (व्यक्त)	Allam Aadesh
Amit Baral	"Sundar Sansar" (सुन्दर संसार)	Amit Baral
Amrita Limbu	"Madhos Raat" (मधोस रात)	Ram Chandra Rimal
Beyond	"Control"	Asish Shahi
Bullet Flo and Preeti Kaur	"Golden Danfe"	Suraj Bikram Thapa; Preeti Kaur
Meghna Gewali	"Kanchi Nani" (कान्छी नानी)	Meghna Gewali
Nirmala Ghale	"Mero Message Ko Answer Khoi" (मेरो Message को Answer खोई)	Karan Raj Karki
Pratik Himal Rai	"Ananta Maya" (अनन्त माया)	Pratik Himal Rai
Prithvi Khanal	"Dhumbaa Taalai Maa" (धुम्बा तालैमा)	Prithvindra Khanal
RC Rimal	"Ke Maya Yestai Hunchha Ho" (के माया यस्तै हुन्छ हो)	Karan Raj Karki; Laxman Paudyal
Suraj Tamang	"Gorkhali Keto" (गोर्खाली केटो)	Suraj Tamang

=== Contest overview ===
The final took place on 7 October 2026 at 19:30 (NPT), and was hosted by Roneeshma Shrestha.

Nepal Decides final
R/O	Artist	Song	Place			
R/O	Artist	Song	Place	1	Beyond	"Control"
2	Amit Baral	"Sundar Sansar"				
3	Meghna Gewali	"Kanchi Nani"				
4	Allam Aadesh	"Byakta"	2			
5	Amrita Linbu	"Madhos Raat"				
6	Prithvi Khanal	"Dhumbaa Taalai Maa"				
7	Bullet Flo and Preeti Kaur	"Golden Danfe"	3			
8	Nirmala Ghale	"Mero Message Ko Answer Khoi"				
9	Pratik Himal Rai	"Ananta Maya"	1			
10	RC Rimal	"Ke Maya Yestai Hunchha Ho"				
11	Suraj Tamang	"Gorkhali Keto"				

== At Eurovision Asia ==
Pratik Himal Raiat at Eurovision Song Contest Asia

The Eurovision Song Contest Asia took place at the One Bangkok Forum in Bangkok on 14 November 2026.

=== Performance ===
Pratik wore a dark embroidered shirt and was joined on stage by four dancers. The song featured dark blue and dark red lighting and a prop visible.

=== Voting ===
==== Points awarded to Nepal ====
Points awarded to Nepal
Score	Televote	Jury
12 points		
10 points		Malaysia
8 points		
7 points		
6 points		
5 points		Philippines
4 points		Mongolia; Thailand
3 points		Cambodia
2 points		Bangladesh; Bhutan; South Korea; Vietnam
1 point		Laos

==== Points awarded by Nepal ====
Points awarded by Nepal
Points	Televote	Jury
12 points		Vietnam
10 points		Philippines
8 points		Thailand
7 points		Malaysia
6 points		South Korea
5 points		Mongolia
4 points		Bhutan
3 points		Cambodia
2 points		Laos
1 point		Bangladesh

== Participation overview ==
Table key
†	Upcoming event

Participation history
Year	Artist	Song	Language	Final	Points
2026	Pratik Himal Rai	"Ananta Maya"	Nepali	9	69
