= Kaveri Jha =

Indian actress

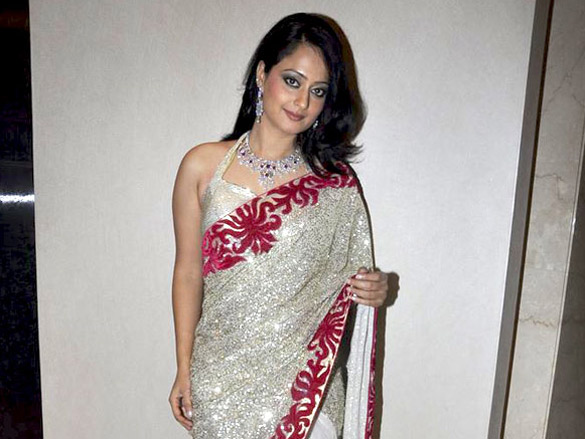
- Kaveri Jha in 2011
- Born: Bihar, India
- Occupations: Actress; model; flight attendant
- Years active: 2005–2011; 2023-present
- Height: 1.72 m (5 ft 8 in)

Kaveri Jha is an Indian model, film actress and flight attendant. She works in Hindi and Telugu language films.

== Early life ==
Jha was born in Bihar. Her family had to move frequently as her father is an Indian government employee. She went on to win the Ms Personality award on Miss India contest in 2005.

== Career ==
After winning the award, she started modeling and appeared in a few music videos. She also hosted a TV show named Super Sale along with Sajid Khan.

After appearing in a small role in Priyadarshan's Bhool Bhulaiyaa (2007), she made her Hindi film debut in Hijack (2008), playing Shiney Ahuja's wife on screen. Thereafter she acted in a few Hindi movies, but it was Telugu films where she moved towards later on making her debut in 2008 with Nagaram, alongside Srikanth.

She juggles being a flight attendant with Air India and her acting career simultaneously.

== Filmography ==
Year	Film	Role	Language	Notes
2007	Bhool Bhulaiyaa	Girja Upadhyay Chaturvedi	Hindi	Uncredited
2008	Nagaram		Telugu	
2008	Hijack	Pooja V. Madan	Hindi	
2009	Naa Girlfriend Baga Rich	Sravya	Telugu	
2009	Saleem	English Teacher	Telugu	
2009	Jail	Sabina Ghani	Hindi	
2009	Ooha Chitram	Keerthi	Telugu	
2010	A Flat	Preeti	Hindi	
2010	Bumm Bumm Bole	Bani	Hindi	credited as Kaveri
2011	Bhale Mogudu Bhale Pellam	Veena	Telugu	
2023	Appatha	Swaru	Tamil	
