= MP3: Mera Pehla Pehla Pyaar =

MP3: Mera Pehla Pehla Pyar
- Movie poster for MP3 - Mera Pehla Pehla Pyaar
- Directed by: Robbie Grewal
- Written by: Robbie Grewal; Sameer Kohli
- Starring: Ruslaan Mumtaz; Hazel Crowney
- Cinematography: Amitabha Singh
- Music by: Ashutosh Phatak – Dhruv Ghanekar
- Release date: 8 June 2007
- Language: Hindi

MP3: Mera Pehla Pehla Pyaar (English: My Very First Love) is an Indian Hindi-language romantic comedy film starring Ruslaan Mumtaz and Hazel Crowney in the lead roles. It was written and directed by Robbie Grewal.

== Synopsis ==
Delhi-based Rohan (Ruslaan Mumtaz) lives a wealthy lifestyle with his father, Shekhar (Kanwaljit Singh), a businessman who owns an apparel business, and his mother, Renu (Menekka Arora). He attends St. Lawrence High School and is friends with Vasu, Sudhir, and Javed. Together, the friends land in hot water virtually every day. Everything changes when he first sets eyes on the heart-achingly beautiful new student, Ayesha Mehra (Hazel Crowney), who was born in London and also lives a wealthy lifestyle with her mother, Sheetal, and her businessman father.

Rohan and Ayesha are attracted to each other and decide to go on a karaoke date, with disastrous results, as they end up in a vehicle accident. Their relationship sours due to rumours of Ayesha being attracted to Shantanu and Rohan dating Simran. They part ways. Ayesha and her mother go to Paris to visit her aunt Parminder and her husband, Tony. Realising that he is in love with Ayesha, Rohan decides to travel to Paris, clear up the misunderstanding, and win her back. To do this, he misuses his father's credit card to book an air ticket and forges school documents to show that he is attending the Maths Olympiad in Paris.

He reaches Paris but is unable to locate Ayesha. When he approaches the Indian embassy, he is detained and may well be deported back home to face his angry father and the school authorities. He calls Ayesha and asks her to meet him at 7:30 at the Eiffel Tower. He uses a cigarette to trigger the embassy's fire alarm. Later, he runs to the tower and surprises Ayesha, giving her a rose and expressing his feelings for her. Ayesha accepts his love, and they finally reunite and share their first kiss, later realising that Ayesha's relatives were present at the scene as well.

== Cast ==
- Ruslaan Mumtaz as Rohan Sood
- Hazel Crowney as Ayesha Mehra
- Manoj Pahwa as Tony Singh
- Kanwaljit Singh as Shekhar Sood, Rohan's Father
- Gaurav Gera as Sameer Kohli
- Jay Soni as Rohan's classmate
- Ashiesh Roy as Chief Official at Indian Embassy
- Sarthak Bhasin as Javed Sheikh, Rohan's Friend

== Soundtrack ==
MP3: Mera Pehla Pehla Pyaar

Soundtrack album by Ashutosh Phatak and Dhruv Ghanekar
- Released: May 2007
- Genre: Feature film soundtrack
- Label: T-Series

The music of MP3 was composed by the duo of Ashutosh Phatak and Dhruv Ghanekar.

Track listing
No.	Title	Singer(s)	Length
1.	"Mera Pehla Pehla Pyaar"	K.K.	4:31
2.	"Kaun Hoon Main - I"	Suhail Kaul, Tara Baswani	3:13
3.	"Mera Pehla Pehla Pyaar (Remix)"	K.K.	4:35
4.	"Dosti"	Shaan, Suhail Kaul	3:32
5.	"Chori Chori"	Rajeev Sundaresan, Suhail Kaul	3:34
6.	"Kaun Hoon Main - II"	Suhail Kaul, Tara Baswani	2:35
7.	"Na Jaane"	Ravindra Upadhyay	2:13
8.	"Climax (instrumental)"		3:49
9.	"Love Theme (instrumental)"		1:31
10.	"Kaun Hoon Main - III"	Suhail Kaul, Tara Baswani	2:47
11.	"Plan (instrumental)"		3:15
12.	"Paris (instrumental)"		1:58
Total length:			37:34
