= Ajay Wardhan =

2022 Indian Hindi-language biographical drama film

- Directed by: Pragati Agarwal & Amit Aseem
- Screenplay by: Pragati Agarwal
- Story by: Pragati Agarwal
- Produced by: Prasidh Eklavaya Entertainment; Ajay Karan Aryan
- Starring: Romil Choudhary; Ruslaan Mumtaz; Arjumman Mughal
- Cinematography: Yuvraj Indoria; Shakti Indoria; Sukhan Saar
- Edited by: Shubham Srivastav; Prabhat Ojha; Ankit Govind Dubey; Gagan Sharma; Manish Eklavya; Priya
- Music by: Monty Sharma
- Production company: Prasidh Eklavya Entertainment
- Distributed by: Dushyant Pratap Singh
- Release date: 16 December 2022
- Running time: 98 minutes
- Country: India
- Language: Hindi

Ajay Wardhan is a 2022 Indian Hindi-language biographical drama film directed by Pragathi Agarwal & Amit Aseem. The films stars Romil Chaudhary, Arjumman Mughal, Ruslaan Mumtaz and Aham Sharma in lead roles. The fight sequence was coordinated by Vijay Cheera.

== Cast ==
- Romil Chaudhary as Dr. Ajay Wardhan
- Abhimanyu Aryan as Junior Ajay wardhan
- Pihu Sharma as Dr. Pragati Agarwal, Ajay's enduring love interest
- Kshitij Patwardhan as Vijay Kumar, Ajay's elder brother
- Yogesh Vatts as Little Vijay
- Malkit Singh as a Ajay Friend
- Ramandeep Yadav as a Ajay Friend
- Aman Bhogal as Radha Devi, Ajay's Mother
- Ravi as Ramnath Ji, Ajay's Father
- Dimple Bagroy as Rashmi Agarwal, Pragati's Mother
- Girish Thapar as Manoj Kumar, Pragati's Father
- Dr. Nikita Sabarwal as Journalist
- Ruslaan Mumtaz
- Arjumman Mughal
- Aham Sharma
- Priya Sharma
- Aishwarya Raj Bhakuni
- Rashiprabha Sandeepani

== Plot ==
Set in rural India, the story follows two brothers, Ajay and Vijay. As boys they graze sheep and goats in their village, but Ajay dreams of becoming a dentist. His parents (Ramnath and Radha Devi) support their sons, while his elder brother Vijay is a source of strength. Ajay’s ambition takes him away from home to pursue formal education; along the way he meets and falls in love with fellow student Dr Pragati Agarwal. The couple’s romance is tested by poverty and Ajay’s single-minded focus on his studies. Despite setbacks and family obligations, Ajay perseveres—working menial jobs to pay tuition, studying late into the night, and refusing to give up when opportunities seem out of reach. With the encouragement of his brother and Pragati, Ajay eventually graduates from dental school and establishes a practice in Chandigarh, becoming one of the region’s most respected dental surgeons. The film ends with Ajay using his success to give back to his community, highlighting his belief that education and persistence can overcome even the most humble beginnings.

== Soundtrack ==
The Music and background score were composed by Monty Sharma, the first collaboration with Prasidh Eklavya Entertainment. The soundtrack features eight songs with lyrics penned by Dr. Ajay Aryan.

Ajay Wardhan

Soundtrack album by Monty Sharma
- Genre: Film soundtrack
- Label: Dushyant Corporation
- Producer: Prasidh Eklavya Entertainment
