= Bumm Bumm Bole =

- Theatrical release poster
- Directed by: Priyadarshan
- Written by: Manisha Korde
- Story by: Majid Majidi
- Based on: Children of Heaven by Majid Majidi
- Starring: Darsheel Safary; Atul Kulkarni; Rituparna Sengupta; Ziyah Vastani; Archana Suseelan
- Cinematography: Alagappan N
- Edited by: Arun Kumar
- Music by: Songs: M. G. Sreekumar; Tapas Relia; Azaan Sami; Background Score: Ouseppachan
- Distributed by: Percept Pictures
- Release date: 14 May 2010
- Country: India
- Language: Hindi
- Budget: ₹7 crore
- Box office: ₹1.34 crore

Bumm Bumm Bole is a 2010 Indian Hindi-language film directed by Priyadarshan, starring Darsheel Safary, Atul Kulkarni, Rituparna Sengupta and newcomer Ziyah Vastani. The film is inspired by the 1997 Iranian film Children of Heaven. The film was released on 14 May 2010. Its title is based on a song in the film Taare Zameen Par, which also starred Safary.

== Plot ==
Khogiram Maheshwar Gwala, Kalyani Gwala, and their children Pinaki and Rimzim are a poor family with insufficient money for uniforms or shoes. Things worsen when Pinu misplaces Rimzim's only pair of shoes in a vegetable shop. Pinu tells Rimzim about the shoes and begs her not to tell their mother; she agrees. She can't go to school without her shoes.

They work out a scheme where both of them share the same shoes. Rimzim will wear them to school in the morning and hand them off to Pinu at midday so he can attend afternoon classes. However, Pinu always gets into trouble at school, waiting for Rimzim to give him the shoes. Rimzim finds the girl wearing her shoes in the school. They talk a little, and then she takes Pinu to their house to show the place, and they find out that the family is poorer than them.

A day later, Rimzim is attracted to a new shiny pair of shoes that the same poor girl is wearing. She asks her about what she did with her previous pair of shoes and when she learns that the girl had discarded her old pair of shoes, she is greatly disappointed. Khogiram, desperate for money, borrows some gardening equipment and heads off with Pinu to the rich suburbs of the town to find some gardening work. They try many mansions until a mansion belonging to a 6-year-old girl and her grandmother agree to pay them for work done. While Pinu plays with the six-year-old girl, his father works. Meanwhile, Pinu learns of the Interschool Marathon where one of the prizes is a pair of shoes.

Pinu enters the marathon race hoping to receive the third prize of a new pair of sneakers (the first prize being free education to the winner till he completes high school), which he could exchange for a girl's sneakers and give to Rimzim. He accidentally wins the race and is placed first. He is shocked and cries on the podium as he watches in despair at the new pair of sneakers awarded to the third-placed runner.

The film ends with Rimzim finding out that she will not get a new pair of shoes. Still, there is a quick shot of their father's bicycle at the end of the movie that shows what appears to be red shoes with red trimming for Rimzim and another pair of white basketball shoes, presumably for Pinu, whose old shoes were torn from so much use.

== Cast ==
- Darsheel Safary as Pinaki Gwala
- Atul Kulkarni as Khogiram Maheshwar Gwala, Pinaki and Rimzim's father
- Rituparna Sengupta as Kalyani Gwala, Khogiram's wife
- Ziyah Vastani as Rimzim Gwala, Pinu's sister
- Kaveri Jha as Bani, Khogiram's sister
- Archana Suseelan as Bubhoni
- Ada as Principal
- Vikas Rishi as SP Vishwajeet Khatoniyar
- Omar as Bishnu, Bani's husband
- Charu as Miss Mahanta, Pinaki's teacher
- Pooja as School Teacher
- Shailendra Srivastava as Gogoi
- Nandu as Phookan
- Sejal Kulkarni as Hoki

== Soundtrack ==
No.	Title	Lyrics	Music	Singers	Length
1.	"Bumm Bumm Bole"	Irfan Siddiqui	Azaan Sami	Shaan	3:22
2.	"Aashaon Ke Pankh"	Satish Mutatkar	Tapas Relia	Rishikesh Kamerkar, Rajeev Sundaresan, Kshitij Wagh, Keerthi Sagathia	4:42
3.	"Mann Ki Asha"	Sameer	M. G. Sreekumar	Malini Awasthi	4:09
4.	"Rang De"	Satish Mutatkar	Tapas Relia	Clinton Cerejo, Shasha Tirupathi, Kirti Sagathia	5:03

== Reception ==
Preeti Arora of Rediff.com gave the film 1.5 stars out of 5, writing ″At some point one wonders who the real producer of the film is? An intelligent audience is aware of in-house sponsorship but here a well-known brand of shoes takes up as much screen space as the lead actors.″ Taran Adarsh of Bollywood Hungama gave the film 1.5 stars out of 5, stating ″For those who've watched the Iranian film, you'll realize that BUMM BUMM BOLE is not a patch on that film. And those who haven't watched the Iranian film and would view BUMM BUMM BOLE as an isolated case, BUMM BUMM BOLE still disappoints.″ Sudish Kamath of The Hindu stated ″The film Takes rare talent to mess up a fine film despite remaking it shot by shot. This extended version of Majidi's Children of Heaven drags on and on.″

Shubhra Gupta of The Indian Express gave the film 2 stars out of 5, writing ″Priyan retains a lot of the original (entire scenes are faithfully lifted). But then he gets up to his old tricks of not knowing how to let a good thing be, and inflates the story with terrorists and insurgents and cops and shoot-outs, as well as a leering tea plantation manager who tries molesting the wife : this, in a children's film? There's also sloppiness in attention to detail: the nuns who run Pinu's school sport thin sticks ( the better to beat the kids with?) and French manicures: is this a feature of new-age convent schools, or just being Bollywood?″

The Times of India gave the film 3 stars, writing ″Bumm Bumm Bole is fine vacation fare for the family and presents a viable alternative to parents who are looking for meaningful tween entertainment in a boom-boom age.″

== See also ==
- Children of Heaven, a 1997 Iranian film.
- Homerun, a 2003 Singapore adaptation of Children of Heaven.
- Akka Kuruvi, a 2022 Indian Tamil film, and another adaptation of Children of Heaven.
