= Pratik Himal Rai =

Nepalese singer-songwriter

Pratik Himal Rai प्रतीक हिमाल राई
- Rai in 2026

Background information
- Born: Pratik Himal Mewahang Rai; 1999 or 2000 (age 26–27); Shadananda, Bhojpur, Nepal
- Origin: Kathmandu, Nepal
- Genre: Rock

Pratik Himal Mewahang Rai (Nepali: प्रतीक हिमाल मेवाहाङ राई; born in 1999 or 2000) is a Nepalese singer-songwriter. He represented Nepal at the inaugural Eurovision Song Contest Asia 2026 with the song "Ananta maya" (अनन्त माया), placing ninth.

== Biography ==
Pratik Himal Rai was born and raised in Shadananda, Bhojpur, Nepal. He was born in 1999 or 2000. His father wrote songs that Rai's older brother performed, inspiring Rai's childhood interest in music. He completed Grade 10 in his hometown in 2015.

In 2015-2016, he moved to Kathmandu to pursue a career in music. He later earned a bachelor's degree in music from Ratna Rajya Laxmi Campus. He also studied at Margi Music School.

In 2025, he competed in the sixth season of The Voice of Nepal. During the Blind Auditions, he performed "Afno Katha" by Sabin Rai. He chose to join Uday Sotang's team. He advanced through the Battle rounds but was subsequently eliminated during the Knockouts stage.

The Voice of Nepal performances and results
Round	Song	Original artist	Result
Blind Auditions	"Afno Katha"	Sabin Rai	Joined Team Uday
The Battles	"Mero Aankhama" (vs. Aashish Sharma)	Deep Shrestha	Winner
The Knockouts	"Chhaina maile"	Karma Band	Eliminated

Rai performing "Ananta maya" at the Eurovision Song Contest Asia 2026 in Bangkok, Thailand

In October 2026, Rai won Nepal Decides, the national selection for the inaugural Eurovision Song Contest Asia, with "Ananta maya" (अनन्त माया). He subsequently represented Nepal at the contest in Bangkok, Thailand, on 14 November, finishing ninth with 69 points.

== Artistry ==
=== Influences ===
Rai has cited Guns N' Roses, Bryan Adams, Sabin Rai and Narayan Gopal among his musical influences. He has also expressed an appreciation for classical music and traditional Nepali folk music, including dohori. Rai has described music as a source of inner peace.

== Discography ==
=== Extended plays ===
List of extended plays, with selected details
Title	Details
Poetry	Released: 1 September 2026; Label: Independent release; Formats: Digital download, streaming

=== Singles ===
List of singles as lead artist, showing year released and album name
Title	Year	Album
"Chhaina maile Live Cover (Live)"	2025	Non-album singles
"Jhari" (झरी)	2026	Non-album singles

=== Other songs ===
List of songs as lead artist, showing year released and album name
Title	Year	Album
"Ananta maya" (अनन्त माया)	2026	Eurovision Song Contest Asia 2026 (Compilation Album)

== Music videos ==
Title	Year	Director	Ref(s)
"Jhari" (झरी)	2023	Prabesh Pokhrel	
"Ananta maya" (अनन्त माया)	2026	None credited	

Awards and achievements
Preceded by None	Nepal in the Eurovision Song Contest Asia; 2026	Succeeded by TBD
