= Ruslaan Mumtaz =

Indian actor, born 1982

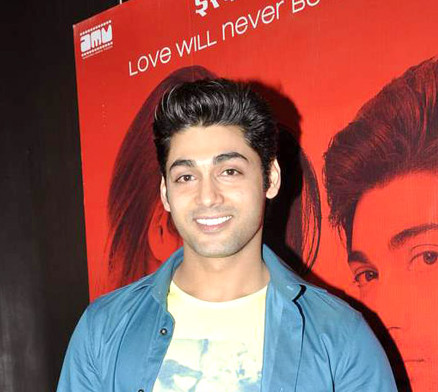
- Mumtaz at the audio release of I Don't Luv You (2013)
- Born: 2 August 1982 (age 44); Vaduz, Liechtenstein
- Occupation: Actor
- Years active: 2007–present
- Spouse: Nirali Mehta (m. 2014)
- Children: 1
- Mother: Anjana Mumtaz

Ruslaan Mumtaz (born 2 August 1982) is an Indian film and television actor. He made his Bollywood (Hindi-language) debut as the lead role in MP3: Mera Pehla Pehla Pyaar (2007). In 2013, he made his television debut as Dhruv in Kehta Hai Dil Jee Le Zara. In 2019, he appeared in Season 3 of the web series A.I.SHA My Virtual Girlfriend as Sam, a genius coder responsible for creating the world's most advanced simulated/A.I. humanoid assistant.

== Personal life ==
Ruslaan's mother is actress Anjana Mumtaz , who is known for having appeared in over 100 Hindi, Gujarati, and Marathi films; his father is Sajid Mumtaz, a former Air India official.

Ruslaan identifies as Muslim.

== Filmography ==
=== Films ===
Year	Title	Role	Ref.
2007	MP3: Mera Pehla Pehla Pyaar	Rohan	
2009	Teree Sang: A Kidult Love Story	Kabir	
2010	Jaane Kahan Se Aayi Hai	Desh	
2012	Dangerous Ishhq	Rahul	
2013	I Don't Luv U	Yuvan	
2016	Khel Toh Ab Shuru Hoga	Abbas	
2017	Let's Play	Karthik	
2019	Jabariya Jodi	Kush	
2019	Yeh Saali Aashiqui	Anuj	
2019	Luv U Turn	Ronik	
2020	Namaste Wahala	Raj	
2021	Oye Mamu	Rohit	
2022	Ajay Wardhan		
2024	Dhaaak		

=== Web series ===
Year	Title	Role	Notes	Ref.
2018	Zakhmi	Rohan		
2019	A.I.SHA My Virtual Girlfriend 3	Sam		
2025	Secret Soldier	Veer Pratapsingh	Microdrama	
2025	Baap Ka Badla	Dr. Ravi Bharghav	Microdrama	
2025	Zindagi Ka U-Turn	Raghav Verma	Microdrama	

=== Television ===
Year	Title	Role
2013–2014	Kehta Hai Dil Jee Le Zara	Dhruv Goyal
2014	Encounter	Pravin Joshi
2014	Curtain Raiser of Amazing Spider-Man 2	Host
2014	Yeh Hai Aashiqui	Kabir Khan
2015	MTV Big F	Abhimanyu Singh
2016	Balika Vadhu	Krish Malhotra
2017	Ek Vivah Aisa Bhi	Ravi Parmar
2017	MTV Big F	Tanmay Arora
2018	Laal Ishq	Nirmal
2019	Main Maayke Chali Jaungi	Dhruv Raichand
2019	Laal Ishq	Dev
2020	Yeh Rishtey Hain Pyaar Ke	Varun Soni
