= Zaynah Vastani =

Indian television child actress

- Born: 8 December 2003 (age 22); Kolkata, West Bengal, India
- Occupation: Actress
- Years active: 2008–present
- Family: Ziyah Vastani (sister)

Zaynah Vastani is an Indian television child actress. Her twin sister is child actress Ziyah Vastani.

== Television ==
- Aapki Antara as Antara
- Alaxmi Ka Super Parivaar as Tinku Laxman Kapadia
- Bade Achhe Lagte Hain as Pari Ram Kapoor
