= Hazel Crowney =

English actress and model

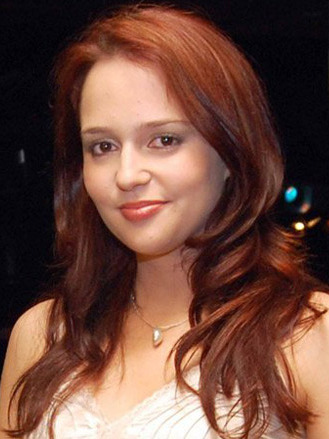
- Crowney in 2016
- Born: London, England
- Other names: Hazel; Hazel Croney
- Occupations: Actress; model
- Years active: 2003–2019

Hazel Crowney, also spelt as Hazel Croney, is an English actress and model who has appeared in many ad campaigns and some Bollywood films.

== Early life ==
Crowney was born in London, United Kingdom, to English parents Karin and Phil Crowney. She has two younger sisters (Robyn and Zoë). Crowney grew up in Grosvenor Park, Chester, England; she completed her schooling at Bennett Memorial School in Tunbridge Wells, and later studied fashion and textiles at West Kent College.

== Career ==
Crowney's entry into Bollywood came by chance in 2004 when she was backpacking in Thailand and stumbled upon an Indian film being shot there. So it came that her first appearance in a Bollywood film was in the item song "Leke Pehla Pehla Pyaar". She was an extra in the film Janasheen. With little prior knowledge of the sub-continent, she was attracted by the music and dance, and decided to try her luck in Mumbai.

She went on to do advertisements for Pond's, Nokia, HSBC and Samsung before landing her first proper role in the film MP3: Mera Pehla Pehla Pyaar in 2007. She also worked in shows, for which she was highly paid.

In 2010, Crowney along with other non-Indian actresses such as Alice Patten were asked to leave Bollywood by Raj Thackeray's Maharashtra Navnirman Sena (MNS), a Mumbai-based political party. They campaigned for a ban on the estimated 1,000 British and other foreign actors who regularly appear in Bollywood films accusing them of stealing jobs from local girls.

Crowney has performed in an item song named 'Reshma Ki Jawani' for the film Kaash Tum Hote which was released in 2014. She also appeared in an item song in the Telugu action-drama Shankara, which was released in 2016.

== Filmography ==
=== Films ===
Year	Film	Role	Other notes
2003	Janasheen		
2006	Ho Sakta Hai	Claire	
2007	MP3: Mera Pehla Pehla Pyaar	Ayesha Mehra	credited as Hazel
2008	U, Me aur Hum	Girlfriend of Ajay's son	credited as Hazel Crony
2009	Kick	Special appearance in the song "Dil Kalaase"	Telugu film
2010	Mittal v/s Mittal	Item song	credited as Hazel
2010	Dunno Y... Na Jaane Kyon		credited as Hazel
2010	A Flat	Gitika D. Singh	credited as Hazel/Hezal Crony
2012	Jeena Hai Toh Thok Daal	Shrishti	
2013	Once Upon ay Time in Mumbai Dobaara!	Belly dancer in song "Tu Hi Khwahish"	
2013	Kyun Hua Achanak		
2013	Kash Tum Hote		
2014	Jilla	Special appearance in song "Jingunamani"	Tamil film
2014	Unforgettable	Nisha	
2014	Kaanchi: The Unbreakable	Item Number	
2016	Khel Toh Ab Shuru Hoga	Item Number	
2016	Shankara	Item Number	Telugu film
2017	Aadesh - Power Of Law	Item Number	Marathi film
2019	Ghost	Neena	Hindi

=== Television appearances ===
Year	Television Series	Role	Other notes
2009-10	Fear Factor	Herself	Contestant
2010	Zara Nachke Dikha	Herself	Contestant
2010	Aahat	Herself	Season 5 episode 69
