= Kshitij Wagh =

Indian playback singer and a composer (born 1977)

- Born: 21 October 1977 (age 48); Gwalior, Madhya Pradesh, India
- Genres: Playback singing
- Occupations: Singer, composer
- Years active: 2000–present

Kshitij Wagh is an Indian playback singer and a composer.

He was contestant at the second season of Indian Idol in 2005 and 2006. His early education in music came from his father Ramesh Wagh. Later he also learnt music from Gandharva Mahavidyalaya, New Delhi.

== Partial discography ==
Year	Song title	Film	Co-singer	Music director	Language
2012	"Kata Rutla"	Yedyanchi Jatra		himself	Marathi
2012	"Uthale Vadal"	Yedyanchi Jatra		himself	Marathi
2012	"Saanj Gandhaalali"-	Yedyanchi Jatra		himself	Marathi
2012	"Yedyanchi Jatra"	Yedyanchi Jatra		himself	Marathi
2011	"Mehki Mehki"	Game	Shreya Ghoshal	Shankar–Ehsaan–Loy	Hindi
2010	"Motu Master"	Udaan	Raman Mahadevan, Amitabh Bhattacharya, Bonnie Chakraborty, Sriram Iyer, Tochi Raina, Amit Trivedi, Anurag Kashyap	Amit Trivedi	Hindi
2010	"Aashaon Ke Pankh"	Bumm Bumm Bole	Rishikesh Kamerkar, Rajeev Sundaresan, Kirti Sagathia	Tapas Relia	Hindi
2010	"Thakalo Thakalo"	On Duty 24 Taas		Panjak-Pushkar	Marathi
2010	"Aanandacha Dis Aala"	On Duty 24 Taas		Panjak-Pushkar	Marathi
2009	"Mukya Mukya"	Anolkhi He Ghar Majhe		K C Loy	Marathi
2006	"Amhi Tumchya"	Aila re		Pranay Pradhan	Marathi
2006	"Thembanche Moti Leyun"	Aila re		Pranay Pradhan	Marathi
