= Alka Verma =

Indian television actress

- Born: Mumbai, India
- Occupation: Actress

Alka Verma is an Indian actress, model and entrepreneur. She is best known for her role in CID where she played the Sub-Inspector Muskaan.

== Career ==
She started her career as an actress in the TV show C.I.D, appearing in the show during its 2006–2007 season. In the show she played a major role, that of Inspector Muskaan Gupta. Her first episode was "Red Rose Killer" and her last appearance was in the episode "The Case of Inspector Daya's Abduction". She then acted in the movie Unforgettable released in 2014. Alka and her friends have opened a coffee shop named Coffee Adha.

== Filmography ==
Year	Film	Role	Notes
2006–2007	C.I.D	Sub-Inspector Muskaan	TV Series
2009	Aahat	Charulata	Season 4 Episode 9 and 10
2014	Unforgettable	Roshni / Tara	
