= Ziyah Vastani =

Indian actress (born 2003)

- Born: Ziyah Samir Vastani; 8 December 2003 (age 21); Kolkata, West Bengal, India
- Occupation: Actress
- Years active: 2008–present
- Family: Zaynah Vastani (sister)

Ziyah Vastani (born 8 December 2003) is an Indian child actress. She made her Bollywood debut in 2008 with Hindi film Contract as Binty. In 2010, she appeared in the Hindi film Bumm Bumm Bole as Rimzim. She also appeared in Indian serial Yeh Hai Mohabbatein. Her twin sister is child actress Zaynah Vastani.

== Television ==
- Alaxmi Ka Super Parivaar as Tina Laxman Kapadiah
- Ammaji Ki Galli

== Filmography ==
- Contract as Binty
- Bumm Bumm Bole as RimZim
- Break Ke Baad as Young Aaliya
