= Unforgettable (2014 film) =

- Directed by: Arshad Yusuf Pathan
- Written by: Arshad Yusuf Pathan
- Produced by: Arshad Shah; Zarah Shah; Arshad Yusuf Pathan
- Starring: Iqbal Khan; Alka Verma; Hazel Crowney; Armeena Khan
- Music by: Sujeet Shetty
- Release date: 13 June 2014
- Country: India
- Language: Hindi

Unforgettable is a 2014 Indian Hindi drama film directed by Arshad Yusuf Pathan. The film stars Iqbal Khan, Alka Verma and Hazel Crowney in lead roles. The film is based and shot in Dubai. It is a love story of Anand who is a car racer who loses his eyesight. Sujeet Shetty has scored the film's music. The film was released in India on 13 June 2014

== Cast ==
- Iqbal Khan as Anand
- Alka Verma as Tara
- Hazel Crowney as Nisha
- Kiran Kumar as Vijay
- Shahbaaz Khan as Munshiji
- Usha Bachani as Nirmala
- Niall O'Brien as Niall O'Brien
- William Porterfield as Williams
- Armeena Khan as Ghazal Singer
- Sachin Khurana as Sameer

== Original soundtrack ==
Unforgettable's music is composed by Sujeet Shetty.

Unforgettable Soundtrack
No.	Title	Singer(s)	Length
1.	"Lafzo Mein Dhalke"	Sujeet Shetty	03:02
2.	"Mai Kahu Na Kahu"	Sujeet Shetty, Khushboo Jain	03:12
3.	"Lagan Agan Lagi Re"	Sahid Malya	04:22
4.	"Abhi Se Teri"	Sachin Gupta	02:18
