= Mac Chew =

- Born: Chew Kok Yee; 1965 (age 60–61); Segamat, Johor, Malaysia
- Education: Berklee College of Music (Music Production and Engineering)
- Occupations: Record producer; Composer; Songwriter; Arranger; Musician; Music director
- Years active: 1987–present
- Musical career
- Genres: Pop; Ballad; R&B; Jazz; Fusion; Rock; Mandopop; Film score
- Instruments: Piano; Keyboards; Synthesizers; Guitar
- Labels: Warner Music Group; EMI; Sony Music; Rock Records; BMG; Universal Music Group

Chew Kok Yee (simplified Chinese: 周国仪; traditional Chinese: 周國儀; born 1965), known professionally as Mac Chew, is a Malaysian arranger, record producer, composer, songwriter, musician and music director. He has worked with Malaysian artists, including Sharifah Aini, Sudirman, Sheila Majid, Zainal Abidin, Fish Leong, Penny Tai, Anuar Zain, Dayang Nurfaizah and Aina Abdul, as well as international artists such as Sandy Lam, Jonathan Lee, Jackie Chan, Anita Mui, Leslie Cheung, Karen Mok, S.H.E and Wang Leehom. He has also composed several film scores, including the Hong Kong film Police Story 3: Super Cop. He is also a member of the fusion and worldbeat bands Asiabeat and Blue Asia.

== Early life ==
Chew was born in Segamat, Johor, Malaysia. His father's family operated a hotel known as Hotel Mercury during the 1970s. He studied classical music from the age of six. As a teenager, Chew became interested in live music after watching a Chinese band perform at his family's hotel nightclub. He learned to play the guitar and bass from the band's members and began performing with them there. He later studied business in Toronto, Canada, but did not graduate. In 1983, he enrolled at Berklee College of Music in Boston, United States, where he studied music production and engineering. He graduated in 1986 before returning to Malaysia.

== Career ==
=== 1980s ===
Chew moved to Kuala Lumpur, where he worked as a musician at the Regent Hotel. He performed with the quartet Regent Four for nine months. He later became a sound engineer at King Studio, where he worked the 2 a.m. to 8 a.m. shift and earned RM5 per hour. One of his first projects at King Studio was serving as the recording engineer for the album Seruan by Lefthanded, produced by Singaporean singer-songwriter Ramli Sarip. Chew also played keyboards throughout the album, replacing the band's keyboardist, who could not play the required parts. His work on the album attracted the attention of record producers, who began offering him session work.

During this period, he toured with Malaysian singer Sharifah Aini and worked with Malaysian record producer A. Ali on session recordings, primarily in Malay pop and rock kapak. At the time, he was paid RM50 per song.

In 1988, Chew served as an arranger, keyboardist and synthesizer player on Malaysian singer Sheila Majid's album Warna, which was produced by Malaysian record producer Roslan Aziz. It was during this project that he first worked with fellow Malaysian musician Jenny Chin. They later became long-time musical collaborators. He subsequently joined Sheila Majid as a musician on the Warna concert tour, which travelled across Malaysia and Indonesia.

In 1989, Chew continued working with Roslan Aziz, who had established Roslan Aziz Productions (R.A.P.) that year. He subsequently contributed to music productions for artists under the company's management.

=== 1990s ===
In 1990, Chew co-produced and served as music director for Sheila Majid's album Legenda, which featured new interpretations of songs written and performed by the late Malaysian singer-songwriter P. Ramlee.

In 1991, he established his own production company, Babyboss Studio Sdn Bhd, with fellow arranger Jenny Chin. That year, he served as music director, recording engineer, keyboardist and pianist on Malaysian singer Zainal Abidin's self-titled debut album. He also served as music director for Ikhlas, an album featuring artists signed to Roslan Aziz Productions (R.A.P.). In addition, he served as music director and arranger for Sheila Majid's concert Legenda: The Concert, held at Stadium Negara in Kuala Lumpur on 27 November.

That same year, Chew also served as one of the producers and arrangers for the compilation album Suara Hatiku. The album featured songs written and composed entirely by Prince Sufri Bolkiah of Brunei, with performances by various artists selected by the prince.

Chew also served as one of the arrangers on the instrumental album Sitarasa by Malaysian pianist Ainol Hisham Yasin and Malaysian sitarist Samuel J. Dass. The album featured cover versions of Malay pop songs that fused traditional Indian sitar sounds with modern music.

In the same year, Taiwanese singer-songwriter Jonathan Lee, then a vice-president of Rock Records, discovered Chew and Jenny Chin while scouting for musical talent in Malaysia. After listening to albums by Zainal Abidin and Sheila Majid, Lee was impressed by their arrangements and noticed their names in the liner notes. He subsequently invited them to a meeting and audition. Initially, both were reluctant to accept the opportunity because of their unfamiliarity with Chinese music and limited Mandarin proficiency. However, they agreed after Lee assured them that they could remain based in Kuala Lumpur, where they continued to carry out most of their studio work. Lee then offered them a three-song trial.

In 1992, Chew and Jenny Chin composed the original score and arranged the soundtrack for the Hong Kong film Police Story 3: Super Cop, starring Jackie Chan. Following the film's success, they signed with the Taiwanese record label Rock Records and worked on more than 100 songs. That year, Chew also served as music director for the Ikhlas Concert 1992, held at Stadium Merdeka in Kuala Lumpur, which attracted more than 45,000 attendees.

In 1993, Chew played keyboards on Japanese singer Sandii Suzuki's album Rentak 101, which featured her renditions of classic Malay songs.

In 1994, he arranged and played keyboards on Rahim Maarof's self-titled album, which included the hit song "Usang". That year, he also served as arranger, keyboardist and programmer for Taiwanese singer Winnie Hsin's hit song "領悟" (Understanding). In the same year, Chew was one of the major contributors to Zainal Abidin's album Gamal, serving as assistant producer, music director, keyboardist and arranger, and composing eight tracks. The album won three awards at the 2nd Anugerah Industri Muzik, including Best Album.

In 1995, Chew served as one of the arrangers and keyboardists on Taiwanese singer Sandy Lam's best-selling album Love, Sandy, which included the hit song "傷痕" ("Scar").. That year, he also arranged the song "Jentayu", performed by Malaysian singer Nora Ariffin featuring Sheila Majid.The song won Best Song and Best Vocal Performance in an Album (Group) at the 3rd Anugerah Industri Muzik.

In 1996, he served as one of the arrangers and played acoustic guitar on Malaysian singer Nora Ariffin's album Naluri. He also played keyboards on Malaysian rock band Search's album Rampage. That year, he also co-produced Sheila Majid's album Ratu, which won two awards, including Best Pop Album at the 4th Anugerah Industri Muzik.

In 1997, Chew and Jenny Chin won Best Musical Arrangement in a Song at the 4th Anugerah Industri Muzik for their work on "Bersatu Hati", performed by Sheila Majid, Azlina Aziz and Liza Aziz.

That year, Chew also collaborated with fellow Malaysian songwriter Johan Nawawi to compose the song "愛的感覺" ("Feeling of Love") for Hong Kong singer and actress Anita Mui. The song was included on her album 鏡花水月 (Illusions).

In 1998, Chew and Jenny Chin collaborated on the musical arrangements for Hong Kong singer and actor Leslie Cheung's album Printemps. That same year, Chew and Chin arranged two songs for Taiwanese singer Richie Jen's best-selling album Love Like Pacific Ocean.

In 1999, he co-produced Sheila Majid's album Ku Mohon, which won four awards at the 7th Anugerah Industri Muzik. That year, he also co-wrote and co-produced Taiwanese singer Karen Mok's hit song "陰天" (Overcast) with Jonathan Lee.

That year, he also served as head judge at Asia Song Festival Malaysia '99.

=== 2000s ===
In 2001, Chew was nominated for Best Arrangement at the 12th Golden Melody Awards for his work on Taiwanese singer Karen Mok's album 十二樓的莫文蔚 (Karen Mok on the Twelfth Floor). The album was noted for its mixing approach, in which the arrangement enveloped the vocals.

From 2002 to 2009, Chew continued working as an arranger and producer on albums by Malaysian and international artists. His Malaysian credits included Anuar Zain's self-titled album (2002), Ella's Simbiosis (2003), Erra Fazira's ... Kini Kembali (2004), Amy Mastura's Lebih Baik (2005), Siti Nurhaliza's Transkripsi (2006), Dayang Nurfaizah's 20 07 (2007), Zahid's Baru '08 (2008) and Stacy's Aku Stacy (2009).

His international work during this period included Taiwanese singer Phil Chang's 大丈夫 (If a Man) (2003), Singaporean singer Joi Chua's 日出 (Sunrise) (2004), Hong Kong singer Leon Lai's 1个故事 (A Story) (2005), Taiwanese singer Jolin Tsai's Dancing Diva (2006), Singaporean singer Kelvin Tan's i 偉聯 (I-Weilian) (2007) and Hong Kong singer Eason Chan's 不想放手 (Don't Want to Let Go) (2008). From 2009 to 2010, Chew served as music director for the concert tour of the Mandopop supergroup Superband.

=== 2010s ===
In 2010, Chew arranged, played keyboards and programmed the song "柴米油鹽醬醋茶" ("Firewood, Rice, Oil, Salt, Soy Sauce, Vinegar, Tea") for Taiwanese singer Wang Leehom's album The 18 Martial Arts (十八般武藝). In 2012, he served as music director for The Legendary Concert 2012, a four-city tour featuring Jamal Abdillah, Sheila Majid, Zainal Abidin and Amy Search. The tour began on 5 May in Kota Kinabalu and concluded on 30 June at Stadium Merdeka in Kuala Lumpur.

On 16 February 2013, Chew served as music director for Anuar Zain's concert 3 Dekad: Muzik, Cinta & Sanubari, held at Stadium Malawati in Shah Alam and attended by more than 6,000 people. On 3 November 2014, he served as pianist at Dayang Nurfaizah's concert Dayang Nurfaizah: A Celebration of 15 Years in Music, held at Petronas Philharmonic Hall in KLCC.

From 2013 to 2015, Chew served as music director for Taiwanese singer-songwriter Jonathan Lee's Even If Youth Is Never Lasting concert tour, which included performances in Taiwan, China, Singapore, Malaysia, Australia, the United States and the United Kingdom.

On 5 August 2017, he served as music director for Sheila Majid's concert Sheila Majid: The Concert Kuala Lumpur 2017, held at Stadium Negara in Kuala Lumpur and attended by 4,000 people.

In 2018, Chew collaborated with Chee Lee to compose the original score for the Malaysian film Rise: Ini Kalilah, which is based on events surrounding Malaysia's 14th general election.

=== 2020s ===
In 2020, Chew rearranged Man Bai's 1995 hit song "Kau Ilhamku" for a new version released to mark the song's 25th anniversary.

In 2021, Chew served as one of the arrangers on Hong Kong singer-songwriter Hins Cheung's album The Brightest Darkness. The album received several awards, including Album of the Year at the Hong Kong Gold Songs Award Presentation Ceremony 2021/2022.

In 2022, Chew and Ken Hor composed the original score for the Malaysian film Juang, which depicts the experiences of Malaysians during the COVID-19 pandemic. Chew also arranged the film's theme song, "Wira Hatiku", performed by Sheila Majid and accompanied by the Malaysian Philharmonic Orchestra. The song won Best Original Theme Song at the 32nd Malaysia Film Festival.

In 2023, Chew received an honorary degree from the National Academy of Arts, Culture and Heritage (ASWARA). That year, he also co-produced and arranged Aina Abdul's album Imaji, which won Best Album Recording at the 24th Anugerah Industri Muzik. Its single "Jangan Mati Rasa Itu" also won Best Song at the ceremony. On 18 November 2023, Chew and Jenny Chin served as music directors for Aina Abdul's concert A Night with Aina Abdul 3.0, held at Axiata Arena in Bukit Jalil, Kuala Lumpur.

From 2025 to 2026, Chew worked with Malaysian singer Penny Tai on her Twin Flames Concert Tour, which included performances in China and Taiwan.

On 8 November 2025, Chew served as co-music director and keyboardist for Sheila Majid's concert Sheila Majid: 40 Years in Music, held at Bukit Jalil National Stadium in Kuala Lumpur.

On 15 August 2026, Chew arranged Aina Abdul's song "Kamu" for her performance at the 40th edition of Anugerah Juara Lagu (AJL40), held at Unifi Arena in Bukit Jalil, Kuala Lumpur.

On 20 September 2026, Chew arranged a new version of the classic Minnan song "The World's Number One" for an open-air runway show titled "Winds Unbound", presented by Chinese fashion label Cabbeen during Quanzhou Fashion Week 2026 at Hanjian Daxia Bay in China.

Later that year, he co-produced and arranged Malaysian singer Aina Abdul's single "Bluest Sky", which was selected to represent Malaysia in the Eurovision Song Contest Asia 2026.

== Discography ==
=== As a member of Blue Asia ===
- Asia Blue (1995)
- Hotel Ibah (2001)
- Hotel Istanbul (2001)
- Hotel ReChampur (2002)
- Hotel Waimea (2003)
- Hotel Vietnam (2003)
- Hotel Bangkok (2005)
- Hotel Morocco (2006)
- Sketches Of Myahk (2009)
- Radio Myahk (2013)

=== Instrumental singles ===
- "Alone Together" (Again) (2021)
- "Boundless" (feat. Randy Bernsen) (2025)

=== Selected production work ===
Year	Artist	Song / Album	Contribution
1987	Lefthanded	"Ku Di Halaman Rindu"	Recording engineer, keyboards
1988	Bloodshed	"Srikandi Cintaku"	Recording engineer
1988	Dayangku Intan featuring Jay Jay	"Kita Insan Biasa"	Keyboards
1988	Sheila Majid	"Warna"	Synthesizer
1988	Sheila Majid	"Memori"	Arranger
1989	Fauziah Latiff	"Kau Merubah Segalanya"	Keyboards
1990	Sheila Majid	"Legenda"	Arranger, piano, synthesizer, strings, bass
1990	Sheila Majid	"Engkau Laksana Bulan"	Arranger, all instruments except percussion and strings
1991	Zainal Abidin	"Hijau"	Arranger, keyboards
1991	Zainal Abidin	"Manis"	Arranger, keyboards
1992	Jonathan Lee featuring Sandy Lam	"當愛已成往事 (When Love Has Become Past)"	Arranger, keyboards
1993	Zainal Abidin	"Orak Arek"	Keyboards
1993	Sandy Lam	"不必在乎我是誰 (It Doesn't Matter Who I Am)"	Arranger, keyboards
1994	Winnie Hsin	"領悟 (Understanding)"	Arranger, keyboards, programming
1994	Aris Ariwatan	"Permaidani"	Arranger, keyboards
1994	Rahim Maarof	"Usang"	Keyboards
1995	Sandy Lam	"傷痕 (Scar)"	Arranger, keyboards
1995	Sandy Lam	"為你我受冷風吹 (Suffer for You)"	Arranger, keyboards
1995	Nora Ariffin, Sheila Majid and Johan Nawawi	"Jentayu"	Arranger, keyboards
1996	Sheila Majid	Ratu	Co-producer, composer, arranger, keyboards
1996	Nora Ariffin	"Naluri (Hadirlah Kekasih)"	Acoustic guitar
1996	Korie featuring Ella	"Pergilah Sayang"	Keyboards
1998	Richie Jen	"傷心太平洋 (The Sad Pacific)"	Arranger
1998	Richie Jen	"我是一隻魚 (I’m a Fish)"	Arranger
1998	Nora Ariffin	"Hanya Satu"	Arranger
1999	Sheila Majid	"Ku Mohon"	Composer, arranger
1999	Kris Dayanti featuring Ajai	"Hati Ini Telah Dilukai"	Arranger
1999	Karen Mok	"陰天 (Overcast)"	Co-producer, co-composer
2000	Karen Mok	十二樓的莫文蔚 (Karen Mok on the Twelfth Floor)	Arranger, keyboards
2000	Amy Mastura	"Sha Na Na"	Arranger
2000	Fish Leong	"勇氣 (Courage)"	Arranger, keyboards
2002	René Liu	"當愛在靠近"	Arranger, keyboards
2005	Zainal Abidin	"Puteri"	Arranger, guitar
2005	Zainal Abidin	"Gaia"	Arranger, guitar
2005	Amy Mastura	"Cinta"	Arranger
2006	Siti Nurhaliza	Transkripsi	Producer, arranger, guitar
2008	Alyah featuring Riz	"Ku Pinjamkan Satu Bintang"	Recording engineer
2010	Jonathan Lee	"Jonathan's Song"	Arranger
2013	Jonathan Lee	"山丘 (Hills)"	Arranger
2017	Dayang Nurfaizah	"Separuh Mati Ku Bercinta"	Arranger
2021	Hins Cheung	"俏郎君 (What Separates Us)"	Arranger
2023	Aina Abdul	"Jangan Mati Rasa Itu"	Producer, arranger
2024	Aina Abdul	"Kamu"	Producer, arranger
2024	Dayang Nurfaizah	"Lemah"	Arranger, keyboards
2026	Aisha Retno, Adira Suhaimi, Nadeera Zaini and Marsha Milan	"Cinta Di Akhir Garisan 2.0"	Arranger, keyboards
2026	Aina Abdul	Bluest Sky	Producer, arranger

== Filmography ==
=== Film credits ===
Year	Film	Director	Contribution
1992	Police Story 3: Supercop	Stanley Tong	Composed with Jenny Chin, Richard Lo and Jonathan Lee
1993	Farewell My Concubine	Chen Kaige	Theme song arranger with Jenny Chin
2018	Rise: Ini Kalilah	Nik Amir Mustapha; M.S. Prem Nath; Teong Hin Saw	Composed with Chee Lee
2020	Miss Andy	Teddy Chin	Composer
2022	Juang	Aziz M. Osman; Yusry Abdul Halim; Matt Lai; Kabir Bhatia; Osman Ali	Composed with Ken Hor
2026	Sayang Sayang	Tang Hsiang-Chu	Theme song producer and arranger

=== Television credits ===
Year	Project	Contribution	Notes
1997	My Wife, Your Wife, Their Wives	Arranger	"Coffee, Tea or Me, I Love You"; 1 episode
2006	The Return of the Condor Heroes	Arranger	"Dual Flight"
2013–2016	The Dream Makers	Arranger	"Hundred Thousand Litres of Tears"
2013	I Am a Singer Season 1	Arranger	Arranged with Jenny Chin for Winnie Hsin's performance of "Understanding" (领悟)
2014	I Am a Singer Season 2	Arranger	Arranged for Aska Yang's performance of "底細"
2015	I Am a Singer Season 3	Arranger	Arranged for A-Lin's performance of "找自己"
2018	Meteor Garden	Rearranged	For the insert song "你要的愛" ("The Love You Want")

== Awards and nominations ==
Awards and nominations received by Mac Chew
Award	Year	Role	Nominated work	Performers	Category	Result	Ref(s)
Anugerah Industri Muzik	1995	Producer	Gamal	Zainal Abidin	Best Album	Won	
Anugerah Industri Muzik	1996	Producer	Wajah	Aishah	Best Pop Album	Nominated	
Anugerah Industri Muzik	1996	Producer	Wajah	Aishah	Best Album	Nominated	
Anugerah Industri Muzik	1997	Producer	Ratu	Sheila Majid	Best Pop Album	Won	
Anugerah Industri Muzik	1997	Producer	Ratu	Sheila Majid	Best Song	Nominated	
Anugerah Industri Muzik	1997	Arranger	"Embun"	Sheila Majid	Best Musical Arrangement in a Song (Shared with Jenny Chin)	Nominated	
Anugerah Industri Muzik	1997	Arranger	"Bersatu Hati"	Sheila Majid, Azlina Aziz and Liza Aziz	Best Musical Arrangement in a Song (Shared with Jenny Chin)	Won	
Anugerah Industri Muzik	1999	Arranger	"Hanya Satu"	Nora	Best Musical Arrangement in a Song	Nominated	
Anugerah Industri Muzik	2000	Writer	"Ku Mohon"	Sheila Majid	Best Song (Shared with Sheila Majid)	Won	
Anugerah Industri Muzik	2000	Producer	Ku Mohon	Sheila Majid	Best Pop Album (Shared with Jenny Chin and Sheila Majid)	Won	
Anugerah Industri Muzik	2000	Producer	Ku Mohon	Sheila Majid	Best Album (Shared with Jenny Chin and Sheila Majid)	Nominated	
Anugerah Industri Muzik	2000	Arranger	"Hati Ini Telah Di Lukai"	Ajai, Krisdayanti	Best Musical Arrangement in a Song	Nominated	
Anugerah Industri Muzik	2001	Producer	Kirana	Nora	Best Pop Album	Won	
Anugerah Industri Muzik	2001	Producer	Kirana	Nora	Best Album	Nominated	
Anugerah Industri Muzik	2003	Producer	Anuar Zain	Anuar Zain	Best Pop Album (Shared with Jenny Chin, Azlan Abu Hassan and M. Syafiq)	Nominated	
Anugerah Industri Muzik	2003	Arranger	"Hulurkan Tanganmu"	Nora	Best Musical Arrangement in a Song	Nominated	
Anugerah Industri Muzik	2005	Sound engineer	Puteri	Zainal Abidin	Best Album Recording	Won	
Anugerah Industri Muzik	2005	Arranger	"Sakit Yang Sakit"	Zainal Abidin	Best Musical Arrangement in a Song	Nominated	
Anugerah Industri Muzik	2005	Producer	Puteri	Zainal Abidin	Best Pop Rock Album	Nominated	
Anugerah Industri Muzik	2007	Producer	Transkripsi	Siti Nurhaliza	Best Pop Album	Won	
Anugerah Industri Muzik	2007	Producer	Transkripsi	Siti Nurhaliza	Best Album	Won	
Anugerah Industri Muzik	2008	Arranger	"Love Surreal"	Melissa Indot	Best Musical Arrangement in a Song (Non-Malay)	Nominated	
Anugerah Industri Muzik	2008	Producer	Eclecticism	Melissa Indot	Best Local English Album	Won	
Anugerah Industri Muzik	2025	Arranger	"Lemah"	Dayang Nurfaizah	Best Musical Arrangement in a Song	Nominated	
Anugerah Industri Muzik	2025	Producer	Imaji / Imaji Deluxe Version	Aina Abdul	Best Album	Nominated	
Anugerah Industri Muzik	2025	Producer	"Jangan Mati Rasa Itu"	Aina Abdul	Best Pop Song	Won	
Anugerah Industri Muzik	2025	Producer	"Jangan Mati Rasa Itu"	Aina Abdul	Best Song	Won	
Golden Melody Awards	2001	Arranger	Twelfth Floor (十二樓)	Karen Mok	Best Arranger	Nominated	
Golden Melody Awards	2011	Arranger	"Jonathan's Song"	Jonathan Lee	Best Arranger	Nominated	

== Other accolades ==
Year	Honor	Honouring body	Type	Ref(s)
2023	Honorary Degree in Creative Arts	National Academy of Arts, Culture and Heritage (ASWARA)	Honoree	
