= Komikoo =

Komikoo is a monthly magazine in Malaysia that publishes high-quality comics from renowned Malaysian artists. Noradz Production Sdn. Bhd is the publisher of the Komikoo. Since its debut in 2008, Komikoo has partnered with different artists for its content, including Aadi Salman, Zafran, and artists from another monthly publication, Ujang. Each story in Komikoo is eight pages in length. In 2014, it was listed as a top competitor in the Indonesian comic marketplace.

== List of Komikoo's Comics ==
- Komiko #0, the first comic, published in November 2007
- Komiko #1, published in January 2008
- Komiko #2, published in March 2008
- Komiko #3, published in June 2008
- Komiko #4, published in July 2008
- Komiko #5, published in August 2008
- Komiko #6, published in September 2008
- Komiko #7, published in November 2008
- Komiko #8, published in February 2009
