= List of Malaysian films of the 1980s =

This is a list of films produced in Malaysia ordered by year of release in the 1980s.

For an alphabetical listing of Malaysian films see Category:Malaysian films.

| Title | Director | Cast | Genre | Notes |
|---|---|---|---|---|
1980
| Adik Manja | Othman Hafsham | Dharma Harun, Noorkumalasari, Adibah Amin, Noraini Hashim, Shasha | Comedy | Merdeka Film Productions; Entered into the 1980 Asia Pacific Film Festival |
| Anak Tunggal | M. Osman | R. Jaafar, Hamidah Wahab, Ahmad B | Romantic / Comedy | Rozhadi Film Productions; The film is now owned by SIAR |
| Bintang Pujaan | Shahrom Mohd Dom | Latiff Ibrahim, Sharifah Aini, Rubiah Suparman, Nancie Foo | | Syed Kechik Film Productions; The film is now owned by SIAR |
| Dendang Perantau (Strangers Melody) | Jamil Sulong | Latiff Ibrahim, Teh Faridah, Hail Amir, Mahmud June, Normadiah | | Varia Film; Entered into the 1979 Asia Pacific Film Festival The film is now owned by SIAR |
| Detik 12 Malam (The Stroke of Midnight) | S. Sudarmaji | Sarimah, Normala Omar, Yusof Haslam, Mustapha Maarof, Yusof Latiff, Kuswadinata | Drama / Thriller | Shasaree Film; The film is now owned by SIAR |
| Dia Ibuku | Yasin Salleh | Sarimah, M. Jamil, Aznah Hamid, S. Shamsuddin, Normadiah, Mazuin Hamzah, Mozaid | Drama | Sarimah Film Production; The film is now owned by SIAR |
| Dikejar Pelangi | | | | Matahari Film; The film is now owned by SIAR |
| Dua Belas Dayung Petani | Aziz Sattar | Ed Osmera, Wan Hasnah, Ahmad B | | Indra Film; The film is now owned by SIAR |
| Esok Masih Ada (There's Always Tomorrow) | Jins Shamsuddin | Jins Shamsuddin, Azean Irdawaty, Christine Teoh, S. Roomai Noor, Umi Kalthum, Rosnah Abdul Rahman, A. Rahim, Taufik Kang Teck Lee, Lily Cheniah, Firdaus Abdullah, Roslan Ahmad, Albert Lee | Drama / Family | Jins Shamsuddin Productions; Entered into the 1980 Asia Pacific Film Festival; The film is now owned by KRU Studios via United Studios |
| Hantu Seksi | Mat Sentol | Nora, Azhar, Z. Roslee, Wahid Satay | Horror | Maju Film Production; The film is now owned by SIAR |
| Ke Mana Hati 'Kan Ku Bawa | Yasaini Amir | | | Solo Film |
| Kilat Senja | S. Sudarmaji | M. Saki, Shamsi, Teh Faridah | | Tuah Film |
| Penyamun Tarbus | Aziz Sattar | A. R. Badul, Ibrahim Pendek, Aziz Sattar, S. Shamsuddin, Mahmud June, Julie Dahlan, Aznah Hamid | Comedy | Indra Film Production; The film is now owned by SIAR |
| Si Luncai | Omar Rojik | R. Jaafar, Yahya Sulong, Azlina Aziz, Mahmud June, Normadiah | Comedy | The film is now owned by SIAR |
| Sumber Ilhamku | Aziz Jaafar | Latiff Ibrahim, Sharifah Aini, Mahmud June | Drama | Syed Kechik Film Productions; Entered into the 1980 Asia Pacific Film Festival; The film is now owned by SIAR |
| Tuan Besar | Malek Selamat | Wahid Satay, Yusni Jaafar, Mak Enon, Rahim Jailani, Fauziah Ahmad Daud, Ruminah Sidek, Param, Zahari Zabidi | Comedy | The film is now owned by SIAR |
1981
| Abang (Big Brother) | Rahim Razali | Rahim Razali, Ahmad Yatim, Ahmad Tarmimi Serigar, Noorkumalasari, Fauziah Ahmad Daud, S. Roomai Noor, Umi Kalthum, Noriah Abdullah | Drama / Family | Fleet Communications; Entered into the 1982 Asia Pacific Film Festival The film is now owned by SIAR |
| Anita Dunia Ajaib | Omar Mohd Said | Hail Amir, Asmah Hamid, Aznah Hamid, Osman Zailani, Norizan, Roslan Ahmad | Mystery / Science fiction | The film is now owned by SIAR |
| Bukit Kepong | Jins Shamsuddin | Jins Shamsuddin, A. Rahim, Hussein Abu Hassan, Yusof Haslam, Dali Abdullah, Samsudin Baslah, JA Halim, Hisham Ihsan, Mohd Noor Bon, Harun Ibrahim, Jamaliah Arshad, Edah Ahmad, Suhaina Yahya, Ayu Rahman, Normah Alim, Noraini Talib, Norazizah Md Seh, Ahmad Tarmizi Mad Zain, Akmal Md Zain, Norizan Hashim, Azizan Mokhtar, Baby Yahya, Abdul Malik Abdullah, Mike Steward, Steven Wang, James Ling, Omar Suita, Mohd Azam Zakaria, Mohd Rashid Md Isa, Saadah Fadzil, Zamry Ahmad, Embong Azizah, Low Hwee Huang, Tan Mei Ling | Action / Historical | Jins Shamsudin Productions; Film set at Kampung Lenga, Bukit Kepong, Muar, Johor; The film is now owned by KRU Studios & SIAR via United Studios |
| Da Di Du | Aziz Sattar | A. R. Badul, Yahya Sulong, Ibrahim Pendek, Mahmud June, Dian P. Ramlee, Aziz Sattar | Comedy / Action | The film is now owned by SIAR |
| Jejak Bertapak | Jamil Sulong | Sarimah, Yusof Haslam, Jamaliah Arshad, Kuswadinata, S. Shamsuddin | | Sharsaree Film; The film is now owned by SIAR |
| Langit Tidak Selalu Cerah | S. Sudarmaji | Mokhtaruddin, Uji Rashid, Maria Arshad, Mozaid, M. Busrah, Norizan, Ali Rahman, Rosminah Sidek, NS Sulaiman, Norasnizah Zaidi | | Gala Film; The film is now owned by SIAR |
| Mama Oh Mama | Ahmad Mahmud | Neng Yatimah, Azean Irdawaty, Nora Shamsuddin, Ahmad Mahmud, Dharma Harun, Fatimah Yassin | Drama / Family | Ahmad Mahmud Film Productions; The film is now owned by SIAR |
| Mangsa | Zalina Mohd Som | Noorkumalasari, Christine Danker, Mustapha Kamal, Shah Reza | | The film is now owned by SIAR |
| Perjanjian Syaitan | S. Sudarmaji | Azean Irdawaty | Mystery | The film is now owned by SIAR |
| Potret Maria | Yassin Salleh | Zulkifli Zain, Sarimah, Neng Yatimah, Sidek Hussein | | Karya Film; The film is now owned by SIAR |
| Ribut Barat | Salleh Ghani | Raja Nor Baizura, Yusof Haslam, Rose Iskandar | | The film is now owned by SIAR |
| Serampang Tiga | Ismail Sasakul | Kuswadinata, Normala Omar, Sharifah Hasnor, Ahmad B, Yahya Sulong, Ibrahim Pendek, Rahim Jailani, Yusoff Latiff, Wan Haron Nespu, Daud Selamat, Annuar Idris, Rosita Rohaizad, Rahman B, Kamal Idris, Sulong Kelana | Action | Indra Film; Film set at Istana Lama Seri Menanti, Negeri Sembilan The film is now owned by SIAR |
| Sesejuk Airmata Ibu | A. Rahim | Normala Omar, Zulkifli Zain, Hail Amir, Aznah Hamid, Marlia Musa | Drama / Family | The film is now owned by SIAR |
| Setinggan | Aziz Sattar | S. Shamsuddin, Yusni Jaafar, Ibrahim Pendek, Rozita Rohaizad, Ebby Saiful, Mariani | Comedy / Horror | The film is now owned by SIAR |
| Sumpah di Bumi Merkah | Murad Ibrahim | Rahim Razali, Ahmad Yatim, Ismail Ahmad, Jalil Jusoh, Osman Taib, Zainab Jaafar, Zubaidah Omar, Hussein Ahmad | Drama / Action | The film is now owned by SIAR |
| Toyol | Malek Selamat | Sidek Hussein, Yahya Sulong, Sharifah Hasnor, Ayappan, Jamal Abdillah | Horror | Sabah Film Production; The film is now owned by SIAR |
1982
| Anak Sulung Tujuh Keturunan | Aziz Jaafar | Zulkifli Zain, Sharifah Hasnor, Malek Selamat, Ibrahim Pendek, | Period drama | |
| Bila Hati Telah Retak | Rahman B | Rubiah Suparman, Ismail Din, Abu Bakar Omar, M. Shahdan, Rokiah Shafie, Saloma | Drama | Filem Negara Malaysia |
| Dendam Dari Pusara | Ahmad Mahmud | Ahmad Mahmud, Nora Shamsuddin, Mariani, Rashidah Jaafar | | Ahmad Mahmud Film Production |
| Esok Untuk Siapa? | Jins Shamsuddin | Jins Shamsuddin, Noorkumalasari, Norizan, S. Roomai Noor, Umi Kalthum, Latiff Ibrahim, Fauziah Ahmad Daud, Ismail Mahmud, Rosnah Mohd Noor | Drama / Family | Jins Shamsuddin Productions |
| Gelombang | | Yunus Masnor | Drama | Filem Negara Malaysia |
| Kabus Tengahari | S. Sudarmaji | Sarimah, Aziz Jaafar, M. Jamil, Lydiawati, Wak Sir, Christine Teoh | | Sarimah Film Production; Film set in Sydney, Australia The film is now owned by SIAR |
| Kami | Patrick Yeoh | Sudirman Arshad, Zul Zamanhuri, Osman Zailani, Ho Kwee Leng, Ibrahim Din, Shariff Babu, Azmi Mohamad, Azizah Muslim, Norhayati Yaacob, Param Andhi, Balakrishnan Andhi, Ganesh Munusamy | Drama | Indra Film; The film is now owned by SIAR |
| Langit Petang (Evening Sky) | Shahrom Mohd Dom | Dharma Harun, Azean Irdawaty, Mahmud June, Sidek Hussein, Shasha | Drama | Adapted from the novel Langit Petang by A. Samad Said |
| Pemburu (Hunter) | Rahim Razali | Ahmad Yatim, Ahmad Tarmimi Serigar, Aznah Hamid | Drama / Thriller | ASA XX Film Production; Entered into the 1982 Asia Pacific Film Festival |
| Penentuan | Aziz Jaafar | Noorkumalasari, Raja Nor Baizura, Yusof Haslam | | The film is now owned by SIAR |
| Ribut Di Hujung Senja | Ed Osmera | | | The film is now owned by SIAR |
| Senja Merah | Hussein Abu Hassan | Latiff Ibrahim, Jamaliah Arshad, Yusof Haslam, Faizal Hussein | Drama / Romance | The film is now owned by SIAR |
| Sikit Punya Gila | Raja Ismail | Dharma Harun, Hamid Gurkha, Ibrahim Pendek, Yusni Jaafar, Norlia Ghani, Nora Shamsuddin, Kuswadinata, Yusof Haslam | Comedy | The film is now owned by SIAR |
1983
| Aku Yang Berhormat | Raja Ismail | Dharma Harun, Rosnah Mohd Noor, Hamid Gurkha, Nora Shamsuddin, Norlia Ramli, Jamali Shadat | Comedy | The film is now owned by SIAR |
| Bertunang | M. Amin | A. R. Badul, Maria Arshad | Comedy / Romance | The film is now owned by SIAR |
| Cikgu Sayang | Z. Lokman | Mokhtaruddin, Rose Iskandar, Suhaina Yahya | Comedy | The film is now owned by SIAR |
| Darah Satria | Aziz Sattar | Aman Shah, A. R. Badul, Lydiawati, Mahmud June, M. Rajoli, Nora Shamsuddin | Drama / Action | The film is now owned by SIAR |
| Di Ambang Kasih | M. Amin | Yusof Haslam, Rubiah Suparman, Rosnah Mohd Noor, Rafie Hussein, Rozie Osman, Dino M. Borhan | | Sabah Film Production; The film is now owned by SIAR |
| Manis-Manis Sayang | M. Amin | A. R. Badul, Hussein Abu Hassan, Maria Arshad, Sukarni Jaafar, Yahya Sulong | Comedy | The film is now owned by SIAR |
| Mat Salleh Pahlawan Sabah | | | | The film is now owned by SIAR |
| Mekanik (Mechanic) | Othman Hafsham | Azmil Mustapha, Julie Faridah, Susan Lankester, Yusof Haslam, Noraini Hashim, Azmi Mohamad, Omar Abdullah, M. Rajoli, Ahmad Tarmimi Serigar, Yasmin Yusof, Mokhtar Dahari, AR Ayappan, Sani Sudin, Imuda, Zakaria Yusof, dR. Sam, Norlia Ghani, Mak Enon, Barney Kim, Jenny Err, Majid Salleh, Din Morgan, Hazali Ramli, Annuar Idris, Dion Bakar, June Rahim, Taib Mohamad, Zain Yahya, Sidek Awang | Comedy / Action | Syed Kechik Film Productions; The film is now owned by SIAR |
| Pertentangan | Salleh Ghani | Rubiah Suparman, Mokhtaruddin, Fadillah Wan Dah, Raja Nuraini Jaffar, Bob Mustapha | | The film is now owned by SIAR |
| Ranjau Sepanjang Jalan | Jamil Sulong | Sarimah, Ahmad Mahmud, M. Jamil, Ahmad Marbawi, Puteri Salbiah, Marlia Musa, Melissa Saila | Drama | Sarimah Film Production; Adapted from the novel of the same name by Shahnon Ahmad; Entered into the 1983 Asia Pacific Film Festival; Screened at the Tokyo International Film Festival, Pyongyang International Film Festival, 1999 Asia Pacific Film Festival The film is now owned by SIAR |
1984
| Azura | Deddy M. Borhan | Jamal Abdillah, Fauziah Ahmad Daud, Maria Arshad, A. Galak, Rafie Hussein, Yusni Jaafar. M. Rajoli, Syed Sobrie, M. Daud, Montoi Yaakob, Azean Yussof, Noor Liza Abdullah, Rahman Aziz, Ahmad Sharif, Ismail Omar, Gatot, David, Patrick Gilan, Eddy Thomas | Drama / Romance | Sabah Film Production; The film is now owned by SIAR |
| Cempaka Biru | | Sophia Ibrahim | | Filem Negara Malaysia |
| Gila-Gila Remaja | Hussein Abu Hassan | Faizal Hussein, Rehana Yasin, Kamarool Yusof, Rosyam Nor, R. Jaafar, Siti Rohani Zain, Hussein Abu Hassan, Mahyon Ismail, Yusni Jaafar | Romance / Comedy | Shah Film Production; The film is now owned by SIAR |
| Ilmu Saka | M. Osman | SA Bakar | | |
| Jasmin | Jamil Sulong | Noraini Jane, Rosnani Jamil, Mustapha Maarof | Drama | Kay Film Production |
| Jauh Di Sudut Hati | Z. Lokman | Mokhtaruddin, Rose Iskandar, Yusof Haslam | | |
| Ke Medan Jaya | A. Aziz Wok, Raja Dalnish | Dharma Harun, Rosnah Abdul Rahman | | |
| Komplot | | A. Rahman Aminuddin, Noralbaniah | | |
| Matinya Seorang Patriot (Death of a Patriot) | Rahim Razali | Eman Manan, Noorkumalasari, Saadiah, Ahmad Daud, Azmil Mustapha, Zulkifli Zain, S. Roomai Noor, Mustapha Maarof, Suhaina Yahya, Azmi Mohamad, Yusof Wahab, dR. Sam | Drama | ZHA Film Production; Screened at the 1992 Pyongyang International Film Festival, 1997 Brussels International Independent Film Festival |
| May 13 | Ahmad Mahmud | A. Rahman Aminuddin, M. Ramly | Drama | Ahmad Mahmud Film Production |
| Melati Putih | M. Raj | Yusof Haslam, Tantiana Hamzah, Rokiah Shafie | Drama | |
| Minah Manja | Z. Lokman | | | |
| Talak | Omar Rojik | Dharma Harun, Noreen Noor, Hamid Gurkha, Yahya Sulong, Ayappan | Comedy / Romance | Sabah Film Production; The film is now owned by SIAR |
| Tujuh Biang Keladi | Aziz Sattar | Norlida Ahmad, Liza Abdullah, Noreman Yaakob, Rose Hazira Sudin, Yusma Laila Md. Suhaimi, Aini Noor, Nor Akma Yunus, Raffi Hussein, Osman Zailani, M. Rajoli, Ayappan | Drama / Comedy | Nirwana Film Production; The film is now owned by SIAR |
1985
| Ali Setan | Jins Shamsuddin | Azmil Mustapha, Fauziah Ahmad Daud, Izi Yahya, Liza Abdullah, Ebby Saiful, Shah Rezza, Sheila Majid, Jins Shamsuddin, Abdullah Hassan, Maimunah Mahadi, Sujiah Salleh | Romance / Comedy | Amir Communications; The film is now owned by SIAR |
| Anak Niat | Z. Lokman | | | |
| Bujang Selamat | Z. Lokman | Faizal Hussein, Tantiana, R. Jaafar, Hussein Abu Hassan, Siti Rohani Zain | Comedy / Action | |
| Gadis Hitam Putih | Wahyu Sihombing | Azmil Mustapha, Fauziah Ahmad Daud, Maria Arshad, Rina Hassim, Mieke Wijaya, Zainal Abidin, Lydia Kandou, Deddy Mizwar | Drama | Indonesia-Malaysia co-production |
| Kumpulan O | Eddie Pak | Dewi Jacquelina | | |
| Madu dan Racun | Abdi Wiyono | Rico Tampatty, Nurul Arifin, Roy Marten, Lia Waroka, Ekki Soekarno, Azmil Mustapha | | Indonesia-Malaysia co-production |
| Mat Spy | Mat Sentol | Mat Sentol, Malek Redzuan, Murni Bukhari, Paul Leong | Comedy / Action | |
| Roda-Roda | Mahadi J. Murat | Zami Ismail, Mohd Hazliluddin | Action / Comedy | The film is now owned by SIAR |
| Sepi Itu Indah | Jamil Sulong | Lydiawati, Nassier Wahab, Siti Rohani Zain, Arshad, S. Shamsuddin, S. Roomai Noor, Sarimah, SA Bakar, Nora Shamsuddin, Rokiah Shafie | Drama | SV Productions |
1986
| Ali Setan 2 | Yasin Salleh | Azmil Mustapha, Shasha, Izi Yahya, Liza Abdullah, Ebby Saiful, Shah Rezza, Dayangku Intan, Baharuddin Omar | Romance / Comedy | Amir Communications; Preceded by Ali Setan (1985); The film is now owned by SIAR |
| Aniaya Jenayah | Latiff Jaafar | Ibrahim Pendek, Halina Jaafar, Mahmud Jun, Norazlina Ismail | | |
| Balik Kampung | Zainal Othman | Ebby Saiful, Halim Sabir, Imuda, Noreen Noor, Liza Abdullah, Shah Rezza, Izi Yahya, Os, Fauziah Samad, Azean Yussof, Othman Hafsham, M. Nasir, Zainal Othman, Norashikin, Webah Salleh, Hussein Ali, Hasfalina, Roslan Tajuddin, Abu Bakar Dion | Comedy | Amir Communications; The film is now owned by SIAR |
| Bas Konduktor | Z. Lokman | Pi'e, Maideen | Comedy | The film is now owned by SIAR |
| Bujang Lapok Kembali Daa | Aziz Sattar | Aziz Sattar, S. Shamsuddin, Nasir P. Ramlee, M. Rajoli, Mahmud June, Norlida Ahmad (Connie) | Comedy / Adventure | The film is now owned by SIAR |
| Dewi Cinta | Abdi Wiyono | Fauziah Ahmad Daud, Azmil Mustapha, Richie Ricardo, Winnie Aditya Dewi, S. Bono | Drama / Romance | Indonesia-Malaysia co-production |
| Hantu Siang | A. R. Badul | A. R. Badul, Rosnah Mohd Noor, Noreen Noor, Rosnah Johari, Ismail Hutson, Maideen, Yusni Jaafar, Sheila Rusly, Jamali Shadat | Comedy | The film is now owned by SIAR |
| Jasmin II | Kamarul Ariffin | Noraini Jane, Umaiyah Musa | Drama | Kay Film Production; Preceded by Jasmin (1984); Entered into the 1986 Asia Pacific Film Festival The film is now owned by SIAR |
| Kembara... Seniman Jalanan | Nasir Jani | M. Nasir, Khaty Ibrahim, Pyan Habib, dR. Sam, Shah Reza, Imuda, M. Rajoli, Amy (Search), Ramli Sarip, Kumpulan Search, Kumpulan Blues Gang | Drama / Musical | ZHA Film Production; The film is now owned by SIAR |
| Mr. Os | A. R. Badul | Os, Ziela Jalil, Salleh Yaacob, Raffi Hussein, A. R. Badul, Karim Latiff | Comedy | SV Productions; The film is now owned by SIAR |
| Pagar-Pagar Cinta | A. R. Badul | A. R. Badul, R. Jaafar, Liza Abdullah, Dewi Jacquelina, Ibrahim Din, AK Jailani, Norsiah Yem, Ghazali Sumantri, Miskiah, Mahyon Ismail, Bibi Yem | Comedy / Romance | Sabah Film Production |
| Seman | Mansor Puteh | Nordin Kardi, Shamsidar Omar, Hazali Ramli, Juliana Badri, Hisham Ahmad Tajuddin, Amran Karim | Drama | Uniti Film |
| Si Jantung Hati | A. R. Badul | A. R. Badul, Nassier Wahab, Ibrahim Din, Julie Dahlan, Farida Fasya, Raffi Hussein, Osman Kering, AR Ayappan | Adventure / Comedy | Preceded by Nasib Do Re Mi (1966) |
| Suara Kekasih | Ida Farida | Azmil Mustapha, Fauziah Ahmad Daud, Rosnani Jamil, Norlida Ahmad, Lydiawati | Drama / Romance | Indonesia–Malaysia co-production |
| Tsu Feh Sofiah | Rahim Razali | Rahim Razali, Jacqueline Mitchell, Haji Arshad, Eman Manan, Ahmad Tarmimi Serigar, Abu Bakar Omar, Pyan Habib, Normah Damanhuri, Hisham Ahmad Tajudin | Drama / Romance | Angkatan Seniman Abad XX |
1987
| Bayangan Cinta | Abdi Wiyono | Fauziah Ahmad Daud, Eman Manan | Drama / Romance | Indonesia–Malaysia co-production |
| Gila-Gila Si Pikoy | Celco Ad Castillo, Hussein Abu Hassan | Hussein Abu Hassan, Faizal Hussein, Norlida Ahmad (Connie), A. R. Badul | Comedy | The film is now owned by SIAR |
| Jejaka Perasan | A. R. Badul | A. R. Badul, Liza Abdullah, Salleh Yaacob, ND Lala | Comedy / Romance | Panshah Film; The film is now owned by SIAR |
| Keluarga 99 | A. R. Badul | Salih Yaacob, Puteri Salbiah, Os, Din Glamour | Comedy / Romance | Film set in Thailand |
| Kepala Angin | Azmil Mustapha | Azmil Mustapha, Jacqueline Mitchell, Azman Abu Hassan, Rashidah Jaafar, dR. SAM | Comedy / Romance | Amir Communications |
| Marah-Marah Sayang | Johari Ibrahim | Ebby Saiful, Norlida Ahmad, Shah Reza, Isma Aliff, Liza Abdullah, Noreen Noor | Comedy / Romance | |
| Mawar Merah | Rosnani Jamil | Raja Ema, Mustafa Noor, Razis Ismail, Noraini Hashim, Isma Aliff, Fauziah Nawi | Drama / Romance | RJ Film |
| Misteri Rumah Tua | Lilik Sudjio | Noorkumalasari, Rani Soraya, Tonny Hidayat, WD Mochtar, Bram Adrianto | Horror | Indonesia–Malaysia co-production |
| Pernikahan Berdarah | Torro Margens | Raja Ema, Willy Dozan, Dhalia, Yoseph Hungan, Abdi Wiyono | Mystery | Telefim Enterprise; Indonesia–Malaysia co-production |
| Puteri | Rahim Razali | Fauziah Ahmad Daud, Eman Manan, Ahmad Tarmimi Serigar, Yusof Wahab, Erma Fatima, Ahmad Marbawi, Marlia Musa, Rahim Razali, Khatijah Awang | Drama / Romance | ASA-XX Film Production |
| Rahsia (Secrets) | Othman Hafsham | Noorkumalasari, Shukery Hashim, Yusof Haslam, S. Roomai Noor, Noraini Hashim, Fazriddeen Fadzil | Thriller | Cinematic |
| Rozana Cinta '87 | Nasir Jani | Bibiana Layola, Helmi Hussaini, Erma Fatima, Kamarool Yusof, Siso, Izzaidah Khairan, Pyan Habib, Johari Hamid, Kumpulan Lefthanded | Musical / Romance | Amir Communications |
| Sayang | Z. Lokman | Amy (Search), Raja Ema, Sabree Fadhil, Rosyam Nor | Drama / Romance | The film is now owned by SIAR |
| Wira Angkasa | Aziz Jaafar | Yusof Haslam, Sabree Fadhil, Noreen Noor, Aznah Hamid, Julie Dahlan, Hisham Ahmad Tajudin, Aida Rahim | Action / Romance | JD Production |
1988
| Anak Sarawak | Rahim Razali | Ahmad Yatim, Ahmad Tarmimi Serigar, Yusof Wahab, Alice Voon, Erma Fatima, Rahim Razali | Drama / Action | ASA-XX Films Production |
| Antara Dua Hati | Rosnani Jamil | Rosnani Jamil, Sabree Fadhil, Raja Ema | Drama / Romance | RJ Film; Entered into the 1988 Asia Pacific Film Festival |
| Dendang Remaja | Johari Ibrahim | Yusof Wahab, Norlida Ahmad (Connie), Azman Abu Hassan, Erma Fatima, Yusni Jaafar, Mahmud June, Pi'e, Mustapha Kamal | | Five Star Film Production |
| Guru Badul | A. R. Badul | A. R. Badul, Yusni Jaafar, Mahmood June, Norlida Ahmad (Connie), Sheila Rusly, Ernie Sulastri | Comedy | The film is now owned by SIAR |
| Irisan-Irisan Hati | Djun Saptohadi | Christine Hakim, Deddy Mizwar, Tiara Jacquelina, Baharuddin Omar | Drama / Romance | Cipta Tuah-Kanta Indah Film co-production Indonesia–Malaysia co-production |
| Jodoh Boleh Diatur | Ami Prijono | Raja Ema, Yusni Jaafar, Os, Dono, Kasino, Indro | Comedy | PT Garuda Film; Indonesia–Malaysia co-production |
| Kembar Kera Silumang | M. Abnar Romli | Tiara Jacquelina | Horror | Indonesia-Malaysia co-production |
| Kembar Siam | A. R. Badul | Os, Ziela Jalil, Isma Aliff | Comedy | |
| Keys to Freedom | Steve Feke | Jane Seymour, Omar Sharif, Denholm Elliott, Jim Youngs, David Warner, Ric Young, Kay Tong Lim, Nancy Kwan, Sam Christopher Chan, Winston Omega, Jacinta Lee, Malek Noor, Anwar Khan, Bebe Louie, Maggie Loo, Lee Sufeh, Richard Law, Ramona Rahman, Buckley Norris, Fauziana Siebel | | Malaysia–United States co-production |
| Lukisan Berlumuran Darah | Torro Margens | Tiara Jacquelina, Dharma Harun, Yurike Prastica, Piet Pagau | Horror | Indonesia-Malaysia co-production |
| Perawan Malam | Aziz Sattar | Dharma Harun, Salleh Yaacob, Rosyam Nor, Ziela Jalil, Suhaina Yahya, Lily Patra, Aziz Sattar, Hasnah Ibrahim, Wazata Zain | Comedy / Horror | Panshah Film Production |
| Perempuan | Nik Muhammad | Azean Irdawaty, Melissa Saila, Hisham Ahmad Tajudin | Drama | |
| Pertarungan Iblis Merah | Handi Muljono | Aznah Hamid, Barry Prima, Advent Bangun, Krisno Bossa, Baharuddin Omar | | Cipta Tuah; Indonesia-Malaysia co-production |
| Sumpah Keramat | Ismail Soebardjo | Sabree Fadhil, Yessy Gusman, Rano Karno, Eddy Riwanto | Drama | Telefilm Enterprise; Indonesia-Malaysia co-production |
| Tempo '88 | | Halim Sabir, Salleh Yaacob | | |
| Ujang | Othman Hafsham | Malek Noor, Shukery Hashim, Susan Lankester, Shaharuddin Thamby, Ziela Jalil, Liza Othman, Opie Zami | Action / Comedy | Karya Nusa |
| Yassin | Kamarul Ariffin | Eman Manan, Uji Rashid, Esther Lim, Teo Bee Ker, Zulkifli Osman | Drama / Historical | Kay Film Production |
1989
| Api Cemburu | Iksan Lahardi | Raja Ema, Sarimah, Ray Sahetapy, Yurike Prastica, Leroy Osmani | Action / Drama | Pengedar Utama; Indonesia-Malaysia co-production |
| Awang Spanar | Z. Lokman | Os, Salleh Yaacob, M. Rajoli | Comedy | |
| Bayi Tabung | Nurhadie Irawan | Deddy Mizwar, Widyawati, Assila Amir, Aziz Singah, Vivi Samodro, Ade Irawan, Fauziah Ahmad Daud, Mangare Siahaan, Frank Rorimpandey, Deddy Sutomo, Baharuddin Omar, Sheila Majid | Drama | Cipta Tuah; Indonesia-Malaysia co-production |
| Bejalai | Stephen Teo | Dickie Issac, Saloma Kumpeing, James Maluda, Bunot Nyanggai, Chiling Nyanggai | | Iban-language film Film set in Sarawak; Entered into the 1989 Berlin International Film Festival, 1990 Singapore International Film Festival |
| Cinta Berdarah | Torror Margens, Z. Lokman | Raja Ema, Hussein Abu Hassan, Hengky Tarnando, Hilal Azman, Wenny Roseline | Horror | Indonesia-Malaysia co-production |
| Hero | Os | Os, Imuda, Rozie Rashid, Ibrahim Pendek, Din Glamour, Raffi Hussein | Comedy / Action | The film is now owned by SIAR |
| Igau-Igau | Zalina Mohd Som | Linda Buang | | The film is now owned by SIAR |
| Kolej 56 | Ahmad Fauzee | Ahmad Fauzee, Salwa Abdul Rahman, Erma Fatima, Ariff S. Shamsuddin | Musical / Romance | Malay Film Productions |
| Mandala Penakluk Satria Tartar | Ackyl Anwari | Barry Prima, Yurike Prastica, Rashidah Jaafar | | Citra Video; Indonesia-Malaysia co-production |
| Menerjang Sarang Naga | Eddy G. Bakker | Ahmad Tarmimi Siregar, El-Manik, Indah Cahyani, Tiara Jacquelina | Action | Indonesia-Malaysia co-production |
| Oh Fatimah | A. R. Badul | A. R. Badul, Raja Nor Baizura, M. Rajoli, Norshuhaiba | Comedy / Family | The film is now owned by SIAR |
| Pak Tam Duda | A. R. Badul, Rosnani Jamil | A. R. Badul, Kartina Aziz, Azmi Suhaimi (Tam), Raffi Hussein, Ebby Saiful | Comedy | The film is now owned by SIAR |
| Pelumba Malam | A. R. Badul | Sabree Fadhil, Noreen Noor, Azmi Mohamad, Erma Fatima, Mustapha Kamal, Edika Yusof, Sidi Oraza | Action | Pengedar Utama |
| Pendekar Lembah Kuning | M Sharieffudin A | Sabree Fadhil, Aznah Hamid, Emma Febry | Action | Indonesia-Malaysia co-production |
| Pendekar Mata Satu | M. Rajoli | Malek Noor, Salleh Yaacob, Ziela Jalil | Action | Indonesia-Malaysia co-production |
| Penghujung Malam | Ahmadi Hassan | Khalid Salleh, Noorkumalasari, Melissa Saila | Drama / Family | The film is now owned by SIAR |
| Pertarungan Di Gua Siluman | Darsono AD | Rachmat Kartolo, Rudy Wahab, Piet Pagau, Robert Santoso, Enny Beatrice, Noor Azizah, Nadia Kassim, Mustapha Kamal, Tarzan | Action | Indonesia-Malaysia co-production |
| Ragam Pemandu | Raja Ismail | Hamid Gurkha, Aznah Hamid, Latiff Ibrahim, Bibi Yem, Azmi Suhaimi (Tam) | Comedy | Solid Gold Studio |
| Sayang Ibu | Omar Rojik, NT Wong | Noraniza Idris, Tamam Idris, Rubiah Suparman, Isma Aliff, Nancie Foo, Syaireen Hashim | Drama | Solid Gold Studio |
| Sumpah Berdarah | Torror Margens, Z. Lokman | Raja Ema | | Indonesia-Malaysia co-production |
| Sumpahan Mahsuri | Jamil Sulong | Norlida Ahmad, Ebby Saiful, Yusof Wahab, Mahmud June, Rosnani Jamil, Umi Kalthum, S. Roomai Noor | Drama / Action | Mahsuri Film |
| Tak Kisahlah... Beb! | Aziz Sattar | Faizal Hussein, Melissa Saila, Ramona Rahman, Rosyam Nor, Pyan Habib, Rozie Rashid | Comedy / Romance | Panshah Film Production |
| Tarzan Raja Rimba | Ackyl Anwari | Machfud Abud, Alex Bernard, Panji Dharma, Yongki Dp, Yoshep Hungan, El Koesno, Barry Prima, Ziela Jalil, Yurike Prastica, Donny Sabella, Rama Soedin, Joes Terpase, Rudy Wahab, Tonny Yusuf | Action | Indonesia-Malaysia co-production |
| Tuah | Anwardi Jamil | Jamal Abdillah, Erma Fatima, Mustapha Maarof, Zami Ismail, Norlida Ahmad, Faizal Hussein | Drama / Fantasy | RJ Film; Entered into the 1989 Asia Pacific Film Festival, 1990 Montreal World Film Festival |
1980s
| Menentang Takdir | | Nadia Kassim, Mustapha Kamal, Noor Azizah | Action | Indonesia-Malaysia co-production |
| Si Dore | A. R. Badul | | | The film is now owned by SIAR |
