= There's Always Tomorrow =

There's Alway's Tomorrow may refer to:

== Film and television ==
- There's Always Tomorrow (1934 film), based on Ursula Parrott's novel; directed by Edward Sloman, starring Frank Morgan, Binnie Barnes and Lois Wilson
- There's Always Tomorrow (1956 film), second filming of Parrott's novel; directed by Douglas Sirk, starring Barbara Stanwyck, Fred MacMurray and Joan Bennett
- There's Always Tomorrow (telenovela) (original title: Siempre habrá un mañana), 1974 Mexican serial
- There's Always Tomorrow, 1980 Malaysian film (original title: Esok Masih Ada) (see List of Malaysian films of the 1980s)
- There's Always Tomorrow (original title Ashita-ga arusa), 2001 Japanese film based on 1963 song, starring Takashi Fujii
- There's Always Tomorrow (2001 TV series) (original title Ashita-ga arusa), Japanese drama based on 1963 song, starring Takashi Fujii
- "There's Always Tomorrow, Baby", episode of Japanese anime television series Space Dandy (see List of Space Dandy episodes)

== Literature ==
- There's Always Tomorrow, 1929 novel by American Ursula Parrott; basis for 1934 and 1956 films
- There’s Always Tomorrow: The story of a checkered life, 1935 memoir by American reporter, spy, and film maker Marguerite Harrison
- There’s Always Tomorrow, 1974 autobiography by English actress Anna Neagle

== Music ==
- "There's Always Tomorrow" (Hachidai Nakamura and Yukio Aoshima song), performed in 1963 by Kyu Sakamoto
- "There's Always Tomorrow", by Johnny Marks, part of score for 1964 TV special Rudolph the Red-Nosed Reindeer (soundtrack)
- "There's Always Tomorrow", on Paul Revere & the Raiders' 1966 Midnight Ride (album)
- "There's Always Tomorrow", on Red Red Meat's 1995 album, Bunny Gets Paid
- "There's Always Tomorrow", from George Stiles and Anthony Drewe's score for 1996 musical Peter Pan: A Musical Adventure
- "There's Always Tomorrow", by Space Twins' 2003 album The End of Imagining
- "There's Always Tomorrow", on 2005's Passion (Geri Halliwell album)
- "There's Always Tomorrow", on Ulrich Schnauss' and Mark Peters' 2013 Tomorrow Is Another Day (album)

== Other uses ==
- There's Always Tomorrow, 1949 English play, with original cast including Hugh Paddick
- "There's Always Tomorrow", radio spy drama by Ted Allbeury; broadcast in 1985 and included in 1990 short story collection Other Kinds of Treason
