= Warna =

Warna may refer to:

- Varna, Bulgaria, a city in Bulgaria
- Warna, a music album by Joey Alexander
- Worker Adjustment and Retraining Notification Act of 1988, or WARNA, a US law

== See also ==
- Warana, Maharashtra
- Warna Warta, a newspaper
- Warna 94.2FM, a Singaporean radio station
- Warna Agung, a football club
- Varna (disambiguation)
