= Mr. Cabbeen =

Chinese fashion designer

Mr. Cabbeen 卡宾先生
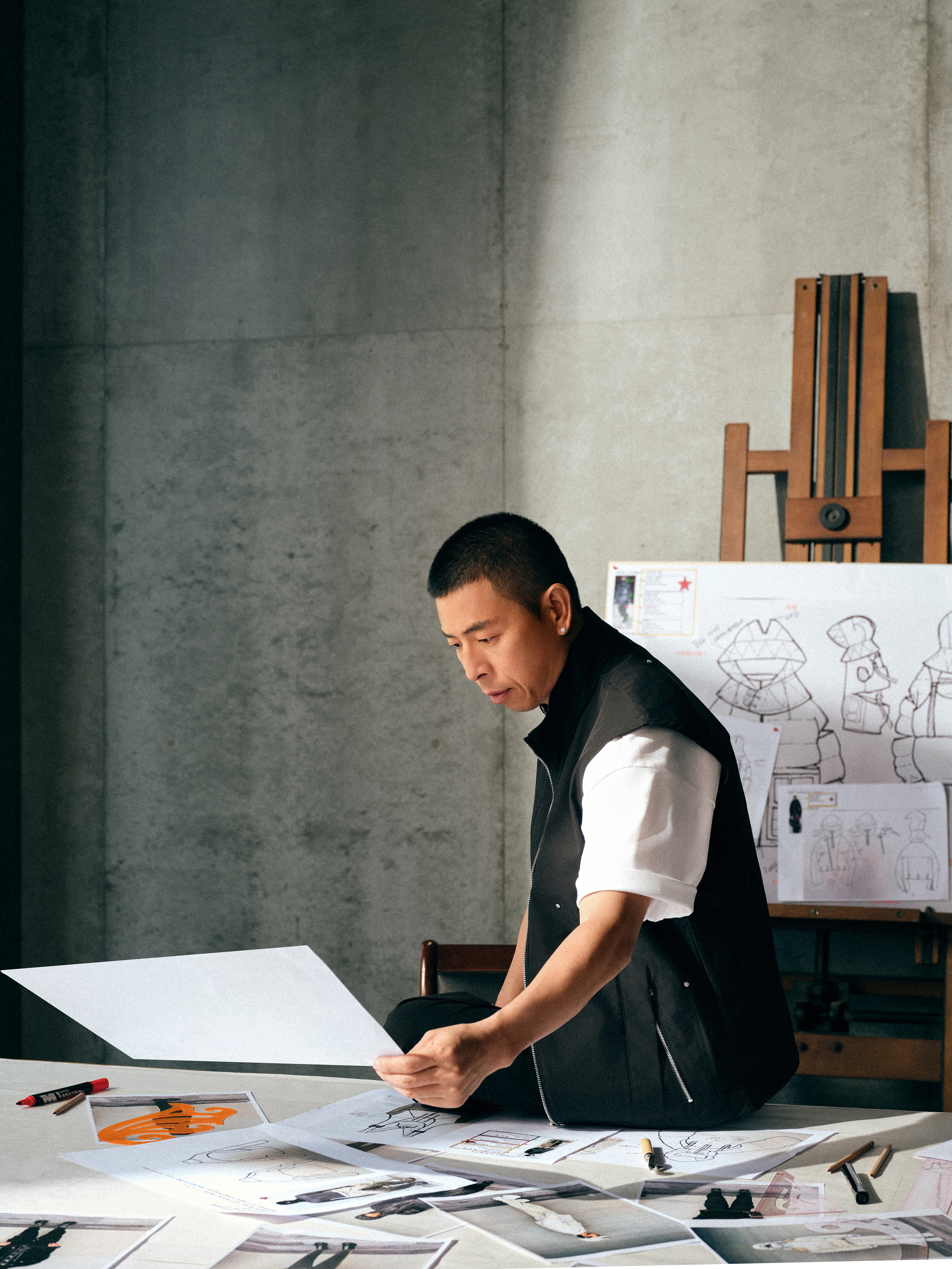
- Born: Yang Ziming 杨紫明; 1971 (age 54–55); Shishi, Fujian Province, China
- Education: Cheung Kong Graduate School of Business; Sun Yat-sen University; Singapore Management University
- Occupations: Fashion Designer, Entrepreneur
- Known for: Founder of CABBEEN

Mr. Cabbeen, originally named Yang Ziming, is a Chinese fashion designer and entrepreneur. He established the fashion brand Cabbeen in 1997. He is the supervisor for master's students at Beijing Institute of Fashion Technology, vice president of China Fashion Designers Association, and chairman of Shishi Federation of Industry and Commerce.

== Career ==
In 2004, Mr. Cabbeen was awarded the Most Promising Fashion Fashion Designer Award at the "Fashion China Pierre Cardin Festival" during the China France Culture Year.

In 2006, he was awarded the Chinese Outstanding Teacher Medal at the Southern Fashion Annual Awards. In 2007, Mr. Cabbeen became the first Chinese designer to hold a brand launch at New York Fashion Week.

In 2008, he was awarded the title of "Most Stylish Designer" by Esquire.

In 2013, Mr. Cabbeen became a consultant professor at Beijing Institute of Fashion Technology.

In 2017, invited to become the brand ambassador of Christofle, a French silverware brand; Becoming the first Chinese designer to appear on the cover of Men's Fashion magazine Awarded the title of "Annual Private Enjoyment Home" in the "Luobo Report"; Becoming one of the first members of the McLaren Racing Club and being invited to become the world's first Chinese designer to design a sports car interior for McLaren; Received the title of "Life Expert of the Year" from GQ Intelligence.

In 2018, Mr. Cabbeen became Blueair's Joy Series Ambassador of the Year. In 2019, on the occasion of the 70th National Day of the People's Republic of China in 2019, Mr. Cabbeen, was invited to participate in the design and production of the National Day parade costumes. In 67 days, led the team to complete over 50000 pieces of clothing.

In 2020, won the "Designer of the Year" award in the character category of "Best of the Best Rob's Choice" by the Robb Report.

In April 2021, Yang was invited to attend the launch event as the chief costume designer for the "Long March-5B Yao-2" and "Long March 7-Yao-3" rocket launch missions. In December, he became the spokesperson for YUPP brand. In February 2022, elected as the Chairman (President) of the 7th Executive Committee of the Shishi City Federation of Industry and Commerce (Chamber of Commerce).

In 2022, Mr. Cabbeen teamed up with Chinese avant-garde designer Wang Fengchen to assist in the opening ceremony of the Beijing Winter Olympics.

In 2023, Mr. Cabbeen won the "Best of the Best" Rob's Choice Entrepreneur of the Year award. That same year, Mr. Cabbeen was invited once again to serve as the ‌Chief Costume Designer‌ for the rocket launch missions, including ‌Long March 5 Yao-6, Long March 2F Yao-17 (Shenzhou-17 crewed spacecraft), and the power test of the Long March 8 modified rocket‌. He attended the launch activities as an ‌Honorary Team Member‌.

In February 2024, Mr. Cabbeen became the Charity Ambassador of Quanzhou. In October 2024, Mr. Cabbeen and designer Wang Fengchen, inspired by their hometown of Quanzhou, launched the 2025 Spring/Summer joint collection "MADE IN MY TOWN 3.0".

In 2025, Mr. Cabbeen become a close friend of THE MACALLAN brand.

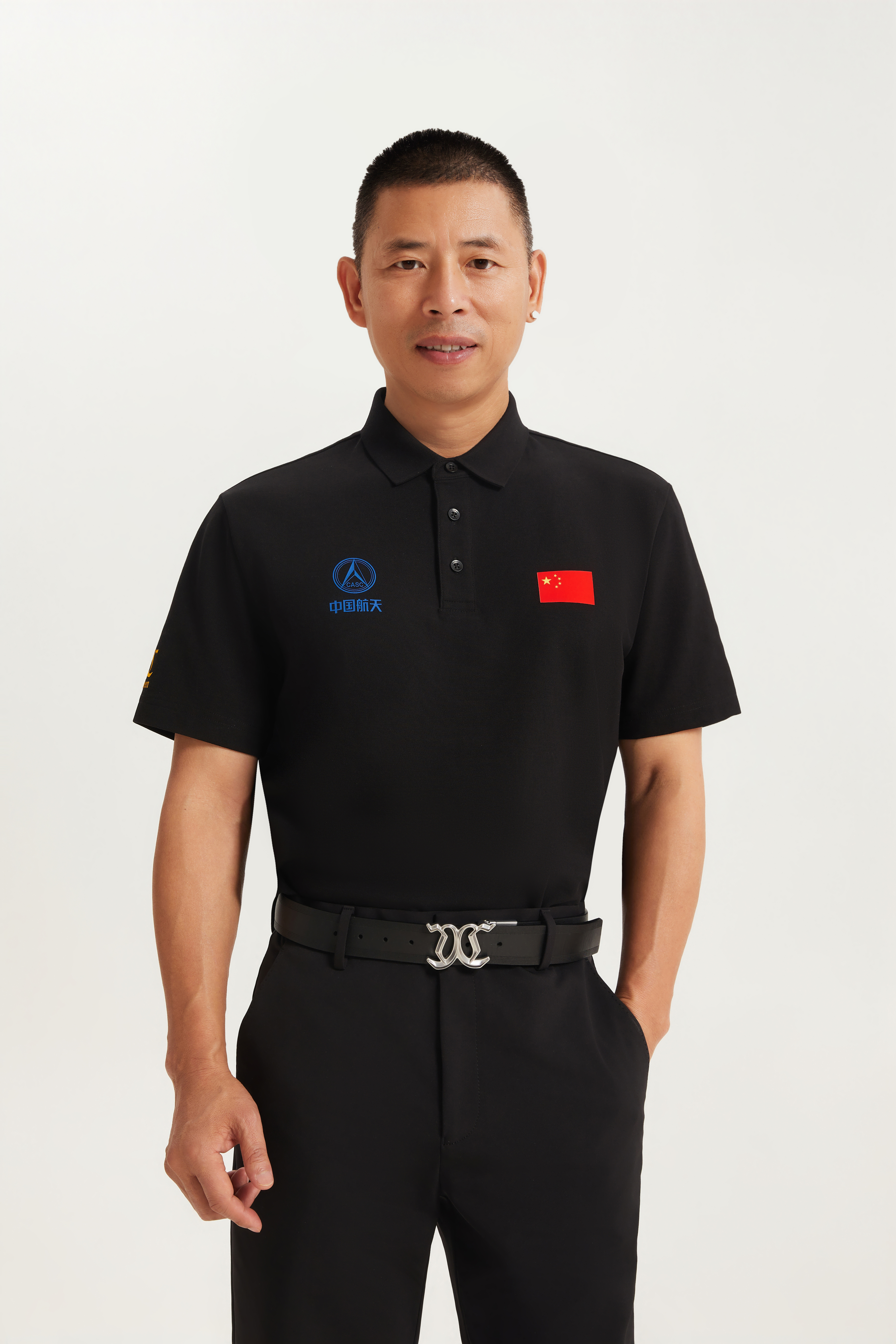
Mr. Cabbeen in T-shirt

== Public interest ==
In December 2022, Mr. Cabbeen participated in the "China Brand 3060 Climate Innovation Carbon Neutrality Acceleration Plan" and was awarded the title of "China Textile and Clothing Industry Climate Innovation Action Pioneer Contributor".
