= Adit Sopo Jarwo =

Indonesian television series

- Adit Sopo Jarwo logo in 2017
- Genre: Animation; Comedy
- Created by: Manoj Punjabi
- Written by: Yulie Odang
- Directed by: Dana Riza; Indra Jaya
- Voices of: Ranu; Reyhan; Musripah; Matsuri; Surawijaya; Dharmawan Susanto; Maridi; Jessy Milianty
- Theme music composer: Harry Budiman; Ryan Nugroho
- Opening theme: Season 1 Dennis' dialogue "Adit, bang Jarwo makin deket!" (English: Adit, Jarwo is getting closer!) and Jarwo's dialogue "Aditttt !!!!"; Season 2 Armand Maulana – Hebatnya Persahabatan
- Ending theme: Season 1 Nation Beat – Hebatnya Persahabatan; Season 2 Armand Maulana – Hebatnya Persahabatan
- Composers: Harry Budiman; Ryan Nugroho
- Country of origin: Indonesia
- Original language: Indonesian
- No. of seasons: 2+
- No. of episodes: 200+

Production
- Executive producers: Arnas Irmal; Karan Mahtani; Ramlan Permana
- Producers: Dana Riza; Dhamoo Punjabi; Manoj Punjabi; Shania Punjabi
- Production location: Indonesia
- Cinematography: Asep Hendi Affandi; Agus Suherman
- Editor: Iboy Eric
- Camera setup: Hendri
- Running time: 4–8 minutes
- Production company: MD Animation

Original release
- Network: MNCTV (2014–2017; 2017–2021); Global TV (2014); Trans TV (2017); RTV (2021–2024); MDTV (2025–present)
- Release: 27 January 2014 – present

Related
- Upin & Ipin, BoBoiBoy

Adit Sopo Jarwo (Pegon: اديت سوڤو جرو) is an Indonesian animated television series for children. Produced by MD Animation, the series was launched on 27 January 2014 on MNCTV. It has also aired on Global TV.

The show was originally named Adit & Sopo Jarwo, but on 20 March 2017, it changed its name to Adit Sopo Jarwo and moved to Trans TV. On 10 September 2017, it resumed broadcast on MNCTV. On 9 April 2021, Adit Sopo Jarwo moved to RTV. On 13 January 2025, the show eventually moved to NET, now MDTV, as the network being acquired by MD Entertainment; this means the show giving back to the owner.

== Synopsis ==
The show revolves around the adventures of a boy named Adit and his friends Dennis, Mitha, Ucup and Devi, and little sister Adel. Adit is the driving force of the group, pushing his companions to be positive and righteous. However, they often experience disagreements with two adults, the large, lumbering, slow-witted Sopo and his diminutive, conniving boss, Jarwo.

A local administrative official, Haji Udin, mediates between Sopo, Jarwo and Adit, offering sage advice that restores calm.

== Characters ==
- Adit, the main character
- Dennis, Adit's best friend, who's afraid of Jarwo
- Mitha, Adit's female friend
- Devi, Adit's female friend
- Adeliya, Adit's younger sister
- Amira (Bunda), Adit's mother
- Aji Surya Dharma (Ayah), Adit's father
- Sopo, slow-witted, stocky and sometimes unemployed, he often accompanies Jarwo and sometimes works for Baba Chang. In "Adit Sopo Jarwo : The Movie" he help Adit to meet his parent.
- Jarwo, short, conniving and sometimes unemployed, he works odd jobs and works for Baba Chang. He often clashes with Adit, although sometimes cooperates with him. In "Adit Sopo Jarwo : The Movie" he help Adit to meet his parent.
- Haji Udin, local neighborhood chief (RW), he frequently mediates problems posed by Sopo and Jarwo.
- Kang Ujang, meatball vendor who sometimes orders Sopo and Jarwo to wash dirty dishes to settle their debts. Kang Ujang speaks with rhyme.
- Pak Daisuki, Karet Berkah villager who gives jobs to Sopo and Jarwo
- Jarwis, Jarwo's twin brother, he is the opposite of Jarwo
- Pak Anas, bad-tempered villager from North Sumatra
- Baba Chang, ethnic Chinese man and old friend of haji Udin
- Li Mei, Baba Chang's daughter
- Madun, Adit's friend, a soccer player
- Ucup, a small boy, who is friendly with Adit and Sopo
- Mamat, Karet Berkah villager
- Kipli, male friends of Adit, Dennis, Mitha and Devi
- Umi Salamah, Karet villagers, a dupe of cake orders that had eaten half by Jarwo and Sopo
- Bu Mina, owner of Warteg Gaul food-stall

== Voices actors ==
- Adit: Reyhan (eps 1-186), Ifa Hasmarina, Muzakki Ramadhan
- Sopo: Darmawan Susanto
- Monyet: Leni Marlina Terra
- Jarwo: Eki NF (Season 1), Maridi (Season 2), Ery Makmur
- Denis: Ranu, Denisa
- Adel: Baby Voices Only
- Pak Surya: Turie Sandos (Season 1), Hardianto, Hanung Bramantyo
- Bu Amira: Musripah
- Kang Ujang: Eki NF
- Haji Udin: Surawijaya, Deddy Mizwar, Ojay Suryanata
- Baba Chang: Freddy Nindan, Eki NF
- Ucup: D. Fatimah
- Mitha: Jessy Milianty
- Devi: Zulfa
- Pak Dasuki: Mardi Garcia
- Sanip: Freddy Nindan, Eki NF
- Pak Anas: Eki NF
- Umi Salamah: Musripah, Jessy Milianty, Siti Balqis

== Awards and nominations ==
The animated series were receiving six nominations in any awards ceremonies, such as Nickelodeon Indonesia Kids' Choice Awards for Favorite Cartoon and Panasonic Gobel Awards for Favorite Children & Animation Program. In 2014, Adit & Sopo Jarwo episodes "Ojek Payung Bikin Bingung" winning Best Short Films at the 2014 Anti Corruption Film Festival and nominated for Best Animation Film at the 2014 Indonesian Film Festival.

Year	Awards	Category	Recipients	Results
2014	Indonesian Film Festival	Best Animation Film	Adit & Sopo Jarwo	Nominated
2014	Anti Corruption Film Festival	Best Short Films	Episode: "Ojek Payung Bikin Bingung"	Won
2015	Panasonic Gobel Awards	Favorite Children & Animation Program	Adit & Sopo Jarwo	Nominated
2015	Nickelodeon Indonesia Kids' Choice Awards	Favorite Cartoon	Adit & Sopo Jarwo	Nominated
2015	Anugerah Komisi Penyiaran Indonesia	Best Animation Program	Adit & Sopo Jarwo	Nominated
2015	Mom & Kids Awards	Favorite Cartoon	Adit & Sopo Jarwo	Nominated
2015	Mom & Kids Awards	Favorite Cartoon Character	Adit	Nominated
2015	Mom & Kids Awards	Favorite Cartoon Character	Sopo Jarwo	Nominated
2016	Indonesian Television Awards	Most Popular Animation Program	Adit & Sopo Jarwo	Nominated
2016	Panasonic Gobel Awards	Favorite Children & Animation Program	Adit & Sopo Jarwo	Nominated
2016	Indonesian Film Festival	Best Animation Film	"Eyang Datang Semua Senang"	Nominated
2016	Indonesian Film Festival	Best Animation Film	"Festival Perahu Kertas Berlayar Tanpa Batas"	Nominated
2016	Anugerah Komisi Penyiaran Indonesia	Best Animation Program	"Eyang Bikin Pesawat Semua Sepakat"	Nominated
2017	Indonesian Television Awards	Most Popular Animation Program	Adit & Sopo Jarwo	Nominated
2017	Panasonic Gobel Awards	Favorite Children and Animation Program	Adit & Sopo Jarwo	Won

== Broadcast ==
Country	Network
Indonesia	MNCTV; GTV; Trans TV; RTV; Disney Channel; MDTV
