= Ujang =

- Ujang given name in Standard Sundanese script
- Pronunciation: Ujang (Sundanese & Indonesian Alphabet)
- Gender: Masculine
- Language: Sundanese

Origin
- Meaning: Boy
- Region of origin: Indonesia

Other names
- Variant form: Jajang
- Nickname: Jang

Ujang (Sundanese: ᮅᮏᮀ, romanized: Ujang, Sundanese pronunciation: [ud͡ʒaŋ]) is a male Sundanese given name, meaning young boy. Other forms of this name is Jajang (ᮏᮏᮀ).

In 2022 Ujang as a first name was found 276 times in 8 countries.

== Possible meanings ==
The meaning of the name Ujang are "young boy" or "little brother" in Sundanese.

== Notable people with this name ==
- Ujang Ronda, an Indonesian actor and comedian
- Ujang Koswara, a Social Entrepreneur & Community Empowerment Activist in Indonesia
- Ujang Iskandar, a regent of West Kotawaringin district, Central Kalimantan for the period 2005–2010.

== Fictional character ==
- Kang Ujang, a character of the MD Animation cartoon Adit & Sopo Jarwo
- Ujang Rambo, one of the characters in the soap opera Preman Pensiun
