= Legenda =

Legenda may refer to:

== Film and theatre ==
- Legenda, 1911 play by Stanisław Wyspiański
- Legenda (1970 film), a 1971 film by Sylwester Chęciński
- Legenda (2005 film), a Finnish short documentary

== Music ==
=== Classical music ===
- Legenda for violin Henryk Wieniawski
- Legenda for orchestra Vasily Kalafati
- Legenda for orchestra List of compositions by Henryk Górecki
- Legenda for male voice choir List of compositions by Einojuhani Rautavaara

=== Popular music ===
- Legenda, a 2012 album by Mari Hamada
- Legenda, a 1990 album by Sheila Majid
- Legenda, a 1991 album by the Polish group Armia
- Legenda, a 2001 album by Yö
- Legenda (song), a 2010 song by Marcin Mroziński
- Legenda (″Легенда″), a 1987 song by the Russian band Kino

== Other uses ==
- Legenda (satellite system), Soviet military satellite system of the 1970-80s
- Legend, a folklore genre
- Legenda (imprint)
