= Juang =

Juang may refer to:

- the Juang people
- the Juang language
