= Azlina Aziz =

Malaysian singer and actress (born 1962)

- Born: Azlina binti Abdul Aziz; 6 June 1962 (age 64); Kuala Lumpur, Federation of Malaya (now Malaysia)
- Occupations: Singer, musician, actress
- Years active: 1979–present
- Parent(s): Aziz Jaafar (father); Normadiah (mother)
- Relatives: Liza Aziz (sister)
- Musical career
- Genres: Pop, R&B
- Instrument: Vocals
- Labels: WEA; EMI Music Malaysia; Sony Music Malaysia

Azlina binti Abdul Aziz (born 6 June 1962) is a Malaysian singer and actress. She is the daughter of an acting-singing couple named Normadiah and Aziz Jaafar. She began her career in 1979, with a soundtrack album, Dunia Ana Yang Punya. She has a younger sister, Liza Aziz

She has a younger sister named Liza Aziz, also a well-known singer. She was previously married to Azman Abu Hassan, a musician and brother of the late composer, Dato' Adnan Abu Hassan in 1992, but divorced in 2010.

== Early involvement in the art world ==
Her artistic career began when she joined the Normadiah Dancer's troupe, led by her mother. She often appeared as a backup dancer during television entertainment shows produced by Radio Televisyen Malaysia (RTM) in the late 1970s. She also had the chance to perform as a singer in public, frequently accompanying her parents to entertainment events. Furthermore, she was given the opportunity to appear as a supporting actor in films featuring her parents at the time. Some of these films include Sumpah Semerah Padi, Dendang Perantau, and others.

Her career began to grow when she received an acting offer from director Aziz Sattar to play the role of A. R. Badul's lover in the 1979 film Prebet Lapok. In addition to acting, she also had the chance to showcase her singing talent more widely when she sang a song written by Kassim Masdor.

She was also selected by director Omar Rojik to play the lead role opposite R. Jaafar in the 1980 film Si Luncai. However, her involvement in acting was limited, as most of her films were light comedies.

She was once offered a leading role in a heavy drama titled Layang-Layang Terputus Talinya, a private production by Sabah Filem Productions. However, she declined the role for personal reasons. Eventually, the role went to actress Maria Arshad.

Additionally, the soundtrack album for the film Dunia Ana Yang Punya also included songs from Penyamun Tarbus and Detik 12 Malam. This soundtrack was marketed to the public by Indra Record. In terms of documentation, the first song she recorded for an album was "Kasih Sayang" from the Prebet Lapok soundtrack.

After her involvement in the film, her singing talent caught the attention of the well-known composer and album producer Ahmad Nawab. After passing an audition, she signed a contract with WEA Records (Malaysia) Sdn. Bhd. in 1980. In 1981, her debut album, Kau Pergi Jua, was successfully released, produced by composer Akbar Nawab.

Her name became widely known alongside the popularity of songs like Wajahmu di Mana-Mana, Dewi Dewi, Sireh Pinang, and others. Her debut album achieved significant sales and earned her a "Silver Disc" award.

== Success as a singer ==
Her career as a singer continued to thrive. Over the course of approximately 10 years under WEA Records, she successfully recorded 9 full albums (including two studio albums with Ahmad Fauzee that featured their joint vocals). In addition, she recorded several songs with other artists.

Although she has not recorded a new album recently, she remains active in performing at various events. Occasionally, she makes appearances on television or at performances when requested. There have also been rumors that she plans to return to recording music. Throughout her career as a singer, she has made a significant impact on Malaysia's music industry with her vocal talent. She is considered a versatile singer due to her ability to perform various types of songs exceptionally well.

Her abilities received praise from Saloma and Rafeah Buang during their lifetimes. Indeed, she is one of the few singers who possesses a timeless quality that should be preserved. It is important for certain parties to elevate her as a successor to the country's legendary singers, following in the footsteps of Sharifah Aini. In the 1980s, Azlina's name stood alongside other powerful regional vocalists such as Francissca Peter, Zaiton Sameon, Khatijah Ibrahim, Dayangku Intan, Sheila Majid, Ramlah Ram, Rahimah Rahim, Anita Sarawak (Singapore), and Hetty Koes Endang, Titi DJ, Vina Panduwinata, and Ruth Sahanaya (Indonesia). She was nominated for the 1987 Anugerah Bintang Popular Berita Harian in the Popular Female Singer category.

Azlina also appeared in the popular entertainment program Mekar Sejambak produced by RTM in the mid-1980s, alongside other well-known performers such as Ahmad Fauzee and Uji Rashid.

== Discography ==
=== Soundtrack album ===
- Dunia Ana Yang Punya (1979)

=== Studio album ===
- Kau Pergi Jua (1981)
- Malu-Malu Sayang (1981)
- Bayang-Bayang (1983)
- Duniaku (1984)
- Mencari Mimpi (1986)
- Seikhlas Mana Hatimu (1987)
- Mengenang Aziz Jaafar & Normadiah (1988)
- Mengenang Aziz Jaafar & Normadiah Vol. II (1990)
- Di Sini Buat Pertama Kali (1990)

=== Others ===
- Riang Ria Hari Raya (1985)
- Hitam Putih Kehidupan (1987)
- Gema Hari Raya (1989)
- Suara Hati (1991)
- Suara Hati II (1992)
- Seikhlas Budi Aidilfitri (1994)
- R.A.P. '96 (1996)
- Adnan Vs. Azlan Abu Hassan Pasti Hits! (2002)

=== Compilation album ===
- Nostalgia Azlina Aziz Vol. 1 (1994)
- Nostalgia Azlina Aziz Vol. 2 (1994)
- Memori Hit (2009)
- Terbaik (2010)
- Biografi (2011)
- Kenangan Abadi (2011)

=== Album that she had joined ===
- Ahmad Fauzee (1987)
- Siapa Punya (1987)
- Liza (1992)

== Filmography ==
=== Film ===
Year	Title	Role	Notes
1978	Panglima Badol	Kenanga	
1979	Prebet Lapok	Azlina	She plays the role of a supporting actress
1979	Dendang Perantau	Emilia's friend	She danced at Emilia Dato' Arif's birthday party (played by Uji Rashid)
1980	Si Luncai	Siti Kembang	
1981	Sumpah Semerah Padi	Indah	She plays the role of an additional actress
1982	Penentuan		She appeared as a special appearance and sang the song Aku dan Kesepian which was also included in her album, Malu-Malu Sayang.
