= List of BL dramas =

List of Asian television series about male-male romance

Boys' love dramas, commonly known as BL, are East Asian dramatic television series, miniseries, or web series featuring romantic relationship between male leads. The list is divided by countries and year of release.

== Japan ==
=== 2010s ===
Year	Title	Broadcaster(s)	Notes/Ref.
2018	Ossan's Love	TV Asahi	Originally released as a single-episode television special in 2016.
2018	The Novelist	Fuji TV	
2019	His: I Didn't Think I Would Fall in Love	Nagoya TV	
2019	Mood Indigo	Fuji TV	
2019	Ossan's Love: In the Sky	TV Asahi	
2019	What Did You Eat Yesterday?	TV Tokyo	

=== 2020s ===
Year	Title	Broadcaster(s)	Notes/Ref.
2020	Be Love	Lemino	
2020	Cherry Magic! Thirty Years of Virginity Can Make You a Wizard?!	TV Tokyo	
2020	Life~Love on the Line	Viki	
2020	The Reason Why He Fell In Love With Me	Tokyo MX	
2021	A Man Who Defies the World of BL	TV Asahi	
2021	Given	FOD	
2021	My Beautiful Man	MBS	
2021	My Love Mix-Up!	TV Asahi	
2021	The Reason Why He Fell In Love With Me 2	Tokyo MX	
2022	Candy Color Paradox	MBS	
2022	Eternal Yesterday	MBS	
2022	I Just Want to See You	Hulu	
2022	Kabe Koji	ABC	
2022	Kei x Yaku	YTV	
2022	Minato's Laundromat	TV Tokyo	
2022	More Than Words	Amazon Prime Video	
2022	Mr. Unlucky Has No Choice But to Kiss!	MBS	
2022	Old-Fashioned Cupcake	Fuji TV	
2022	Senpai, This Can't Be Love!	MBS	
2022	Shimbashi Koi Story	YouTube	
2022	Takara-kun & Amagi-kun	MBS	
2022	The 8.2 Second Rule	YouTube	
2022	We're Both Grooms	Kansai TV	
2023	I Became the Main Role of a BL Drama	Telasa	
2023	I Cannot Reach You	Netflix; TBS	
2023	If It's With You	MBS	
2023	Jack o' Frost	MBS	
2023	Me, My Husband & My Husband's Boyfriend	Paravi	
2023	Mr. Sahara & Toki-kun	MBS	
2023	My Personal Weatherman	MBS	
2023	Naked Dining	Kansai TV	
2023	One Room Angel	MBS	
2023	Our Dining Table	BS-TBS	
2023	Polyethylene Terephthalate	YouTube	
2023	Shimbashi Koi Story 3	YouTube	
2023	The End of the World With You	ABC	
2023	Tokyo in April is...	MBS	
2024	Although I Love You, and You?	YTV	
2024	At 25:00, in Akasaka	TV Tokyo	
2024	Cosmetic Playlover	Fuji TV	Uncut episodes released on FOD.
2024	Happy of the End	Fuji TV	Uncut episodes released on FOD.
2024	I Hear the Sunspot	U-Next; TV Tokyo	
2024	Living with Him	Tokyo MX	
2024	Love is Better the Second Time Around	MBS; TBS	
2024	My Strawberry Film	MBS	
2024	Ossan's Love Returns	TV Asahi	
2024	Perfect Propose	Fuji TV; FOD	
2024	Our Youth	YTV	
2024	Smells Like Green Spirit	MBS; TVK	
2024	Sugar Dog Life	TV Asahi; ABC	
2024	Takara's Treasure	BS Asahi; TVK	
2025	10 Things I Want to Do Before I Turn 40	TV Tokyo	
2025	Punks Triangle	Fuji TV	
2025	Chosen Home	Nippon Television	
2025	Therapy Game	Nippon Television	
2025	Love Begins in the World of If	MBS	
2025	School Trip: Joined a Group I'm Not Close To	ABC	
2025	When It Rains, It Pours	MBS; TVK	
2026	Contrast	FOD	
2026	Unexpectedly Naughty Fukami	Tokyo MX	
2026	Soul Mate	Netflix	

== South Korea ==
=== 2010s ===
Year	Title	Broadcaster(s)	Notes/Ref.
2017	Long Time No See	Naver TV	

=== 2020s ===
Year	Title	Broadcaster(s)	Notes/Ref.
2020	Color Rush	Seezn; Wavve; Naver Series On; Skylife VOD	
2020	Discipline Z: Vampire	YouTube	
2020	Mr. Heart	Viki	
2020	Where Your Eyes Linger	W-STORY; Viki	Director's cut released on Netflix, Wavve, TVING and Naver TV.
2020	Wish You: Your Melody from My Heart	WeTV; Viki	
2021	Behind Cut	Viki	
2021	Light on Me	Watcha	
2021	My Sweet Dear	Viki	
2021	Nobleman Ryu's Wedding	Line TV; WeTV	
2021	Peach of Time	WeTV	
2021	The Tasty Florida	WeTV; Viki	
2021	Tinted With You	Viki	
2021	To My Star	Viki	
2021	You Make Me Dance	Viki	
2022	Blueming	iQIYI	
2022	Cherry Blossoms After Winter	Viki	
2022	Choco Milk Shake	YouTube	
2022	Color Rush 2	Seezn; Wavve; Naver Series On; Skylife VOD	
2022	First Love Again	Line TV; Viki	
2022	Happy Ending Romance	Viki	
2022	Kissable Lips	Viki	
2022	Love Class	Viki	
2022	Ocean Likes Me	Viki	
2022	Oh! Boarding House	Viki	
2022	Oh! My Assistant	Viki	
2022	Once Again	iQIYI; Viki	
2022	Roommates of Poongduck 304	Viki	
2022	Semantic Error	Watcha	
2022	The Director Who Buys Me Dinner	iQIYI	
2022	The New Employee	Viki	
2022	To My Star 2: Our Untold Stories	Viki	
2023	A Breeze of Love	iQIYI	
2023	A Shoulder To Cry On	Watcha; Wavve; TVING	
2023	All the Liquors	TVING; Viki	
2023	Behind the Shadows	KBS2	Broadcast as part of the KBS Drama Special anthology series.
2023	Bon Appetit	iQIYI	
2023	Bump Up Business	iQIYI	
2023	Happy Merry Ending	Wavve; TVING	
2023	Individual Circumstances	iQIYI; Viki	
2023	Jun and Jun	WeTV; Viki	
2023	Love Class 2	Watcha	
2023	Love Mate	Viki	
2023	Love Tractor	iQIYI	
2023	Our Dating Sim	Naver Series On; Heavenly	
2023	Sing My Crush	iQIYI	
2023	Star Struck	iQIYI	
2023	The Eighth Sense	Viki	
2023	Unintentional Love Story	TVING	
2023	Why R U?	iQIYI; Viki	
2024	Blossom Campus	iQIYI	
2024	Boys Be Brave!	Viki	
2024	Gray Shelter	iQIYI	
2024	Jazz for Two	Cinema Heaven	
2024	Love for Love's Sake	Cinema Heaven	Also released on Netflix, iQIYI, Wavve and TVING.
2024	Love in the Big City	TVING	
2024	Love is Like a Cat	Viki	
2024	Seoul Blues	YouTube	
2025	Ball Boy Tactics	Heavenly	
2025	FC Soldout	iQIYI	
2025	Heart Stain	iQIYI	
2025	Heesu in Class 2	Heavenly	
2025	Secret Relationships	Watcha	
2026	Always Meet Again	Heavenly	
2026	Tide of Love (Season 2)	iQIYI	
2026	Never Forget Your Enemy	WeTV	
2026	Love Class 3	Wavve	
2026	The Prosecutor's Proposal	Wavve	

== Taiwan ==
=== 2010s ===
Year	Title	Broadcaster(s)	Notes/Ref.
2017	HIStory: My Hero	Choco TV; CTS	
2017	HIStory: Obsessed	Choco TV; CTS	
2017	HIStory: Stay Away From Me	Choco TV; CTS	
2017	Red Balloon	KKTV	
2018	HIStory2: Crossing the Line	Choco TV; CTS	
2018	HIStory2: Right or Wrong	Choco TV; CTS	
2018	Mermaid Sauna	KKTV	
2019	HIStory3: Make Our Days Count	Line TV	
2019	HIStory3: Trapped	Line TV	

=== 2020s ===
Year	Title	Broadcaster(s)	Notes/Ref.
2020	Because of You	KKTV	Reruns broadcast on VL Movies.
2020	Craving You	KKTV	
2020	Jump the Boy!	YouTube	
2021	Be Loved in House	KKTV; Vidol	
2021	HIStory4: Close to You	Line TV; EYE TV Drama	
2021	Innocent	Viki; GagaOOLala	
2021	Papa & Daddy	GagaOOLala	
2021	See You After Quarantine?	KKTV	
2021	We Best Love: Fighting Mr. 2nd	WeTV	
2021	We Best Love: No. 1 For You	WeTV	
2022	About Youth	Bilibili; EBC Drama	
2022	DNA Says I Love You	KKTV; iQIYI	
2022	HIStory5: Love in the Future	Line TV	
2022	My Tooth Your Love	Line TV; Catchplay+	
2022	Plus & Minus	Catchplay+	
2023	Kiseki: Dear to Me	GTV	
2023	Stay by My Side	Vidol	
2023	VIP Only	Vidol	
2023	You Are Mine	SET TV	
2024	Anti Reset	iQIYI; Viki	
2024	First Note of Love	friDay Video; GagaOOLala	
2024	Let's Talk About Chu	Netflix	
2024	See Your Love	iQIYI	
2024	The On1y One	Netflix; iQIYI	
2024	Unknown	YouTube	
2024	The On1y One	Youku; YouTube	
2025	A Perfect Match	iQIYI; Line TV	
2025	Exclusive Love	iQIYI; Line TV	
2025	Fight For You	iQIYI; GagaOOLala	
2025	Impression Of Youth	Viki	
2025	Love After Addiction	GTV Drama	
2025	Secret Lover	GTV; iQIYI; GagaOOLala	
2025	The Promise of the Soul	SET Taiwan; GTV Drama; YouTube	Also released on iQIYI and GagaOOLala.
2026	Wishing Upon the Shooting Stars	Viki; GagaOOlala; Line TV	

== Thailand ==
=== 2010s ===
Year	Title	Broadcaster(s)	Notes/Ref.
2014	My Bromance - Movie		Related Content My Bromance 2: 5 Years Later 2020
2014	Love Sick	Modernine TV	
2014	Room Alone 401–410	One HD; Bang Channel; GMM 25 (Rerun)	Not fully BL but has a BL couple: Phurikulkrit Chusakdiskulwibul (Amp) as Gang; Achirawich Saliwattana (Gun Achi) as Earng
2015	Room Alone 2	One31; Bang Channel; LINE TV	Not fully BL but has a BL couple: Phurikulkrit Chusakdiskulwibul (Amp) as Gang; Achirawich Saliwattana (Gun Achi) as Earng
2016	Make It Right	MCOT HD; Line TV	
2016	My Bromance The Series	MCOT HD; Line TV	
2016	Senior Secret Love: Puppy Honey	One 31; Netflix; GMM 25	Not fully BL but has a BL couple: Jumpol Adulkittiporn (Off) as Pick; Atthaphan Phunsawat (Gun) as Rome
2016	SOTUS	One 31; Line TV	Reruns broadcast on GMM 25 in 2019. Widely regarded as one of the most influential Asian BL dramas of all time and saved GMMTV from bankruptcy.
2017	2 Moons	One 31	
2017	I Am Your King	MCOT HD	generally does not have a definitively happy ending, often described as having a "terrible" or unresolved ending
2017	Senior Secret Love: Puppy Honey 2	One31; GMM 25	
2017	My Dear Loser: Edge of 17	GMM 25; Line TV	Not fully BL but has a BL couple: Purim Rattanaruangwattana (Pluem) as In; Wachirawit Ruangwiwat (Chimon) as Sun
2017	SOTUS S	One 31; Line TV	Sequel to SOTUS
2017	Together With Me	Line TV	
2017	Water Boyy	One 31; Line TV	
	Bangkok G Story	YouTube	
	Present Perfect Movie - 2017		Part 1
	Present Still Perfect Movie - 2020		Part 2
2018	'Cause You're My Boy	One 31; Line TV	
2018	Kiss Me Again	GMM 25; Line TV	Not fully BL but has a BL couple: Tawan Vihokratana (Tay) as Phubodin Rachatraku (Pete); Thitipoom Techaapaikhun (New) as Phanuwat Chotiwat (Khao) Related Content Kiss: The Series, Our Skyy, Dark Blue Kiss
2018	Love by Chance	GMM 25; Line TV	Initially scheduled to air on MCOT HD, but was cancelled a day before its scheduled premiere. Later picked up by GMM 25.
2018	My Dream	Line TV	generally considered to have a very frustrating, open-ended, or unresolved ending
2018	Our Skyy	Line TV	Senior Secret Love: Puppy Honey and Senior Secret Love: Puppy Honey 2; Pick-Rome; My Dear Loser: Edge of 17; In-Sun; 'Cause You're My Boy; Tee-Mork; Kiss: The Series and Kiss Me Again; Pete-Khao; SOTUS and SOTUS S; Kongphob-Arthit
2018	Roop Thong	GMM 25	The series, which is known for its heavy drama and toxic relationships, features a very tragic, sad ending
2019	2Wish	AIS Play	
2019	Dark Blue Kiss	GMM 25; Line TV	Related Content Kiss: The Series, Kiss Me Again , Our Skyy
2019	He's Coming to Me	Line TV	
2019	I Am Your King 2	9MCOT HD	No Clear Closure: The ending is widely considered disappointing by viewers because it fails to resolve the main story line or provide closure for the characters.
2019	Love Poison	WeTV	Related Content Love Poison Season 2
2019	Reminders	Line TV	
2019	Thank God It's Friday	One 31; Line TV	
2019	TharnType	One 31; Line TV	
2019	The Best Twins	Line TV	
2019	The Effect	Line TV	sad ending. It is a very dark, heavy Thai BL drama that ends on a tragic or highly ambiguous "cliffhanger" "
2019	Theory of Love	GMM 25; Line TV	
2019	Until We Meet Again	Line TV	
2019	With Love	Line TV	

=== 2020s ===
Thai BL dramas released in 2020
Title	Broadcaster(s)	Notes/Ref.
Why R U?	Line TV	
2gether	GMM 25; Line TV	
En of Love: TOSSARA Chapter 1	Line TV; YouTube	
En of Love: Love Mechanics Chapter 2	Line TV; YouTube	
En of Love: This Is Love Story Chapter 3	Line TV; YouTube	
Friend Forever	9MCOT HD	
Gen Y	Channel 3	
I Told Sunset About You	Line TV	
Love by Chance 2: A Chance to Love	WeTV	
Manner of Death	WeTV	
My Bromance 2: 5 Years Later	Line TV	Related My Bromance The movie (2014)
My Engineer	WeTV	
My Friendship	Line TV - YouTube	bittersweet or sad ending
My Gear and Your Gown	GMM 25; WeTV	
Oxygen	One 31	
Still 2gether	GMM 25; Line TV	
TharnType 2: 7 Years of Love	One 31; Line TV	
The Moment Since	Line TV; YouTube	
The Shipper	GMM 25	sad ending; it is considered bittersweet. While it offers closure for the characters, the ending involves significant tragedy The BL Couple (Way/Kim): It is revealed that Kim actually died, so the couple does not get to live together in the real world
Tonhon Chonlatee	GMM 25; AIS Play	
YYY	Line TV	

Thai BL dramas released in 2021
Title	Broadcaster(s)	Notes/Ref.
A Tale of Thousand Stars	GMM 25; Line TV	
Bad Buddy	GMM 25; WeTV	
Bite Me	One 31; Viu	
Brothers	One 31	
Call It What You Want	GagaOOLala	
Call It What You Want 2	GagaOOLala	
Close Friend	Viu	
Country Boy	YouTube	
Don't Say No	One 31; Line TV	
Fish Upon the Sky	GMM 25; Line TV	
Gen Y 2	Channel 3; iQIYI	
Golden Blood	Channel 3; YouTube	
Hidden Love	Channel 7	
I Promised You the Moon	Line TV	
Love Area	9MCOT HD; GagaOOLala	The Part 2 is unresolved sad ending
Love Poison 2	WeTV	
Love With Benefits	Line TV; YouTube	
Loveless Society	Line TV	unresolved sad ending
Lovely Writer	Channel 3	
My Boy	9MCOT HD; YouTube	
My Mate Match	Line TV	
Nitiman	One 31; WeTV	
Not Me	GMM 25; AIS Play	
Paint with Love	Channel 3; POPS Thailand	
Second Chance	Line TV; YouTube	
Siew Sum Noi	AIS Play	
The Cupid Coach	Line TV	
The Yearbook	Amarin TV; Line TV	
Top Secret Together	Line TV; GagaOOLala	
Y-Destiny	AIS Play	

Thai BL dramas released in 2022
Title	Broadcaster(s)	Notes/Ref.
21 Days Theory	YouTube	
180 Degree Longitude Passes Through Us	One 31; TrueID	Sad Ending
609 Bedtime Story	WeTV	
Ai Long Nhai	Channel 3; iQIYI	
Between Us	One 31; iQIYI	
Big Dragon	One 31; Viki	
Boy Scouts	YouTube	Sad Ending
Check Out	Amarin TV	
Close Friend 2	Viu	
Coffee Melody	Channel 3; Viki	
Cupid's Last Wish	GMM 25; Disney+ Hotstar	
Cutie Pie	Workpoint TV	
Dear Doctor, I'm Coming for Soul	GMM 25; iQIYI	Sad Ending
Enchanté	GMM 25	
Even Sun	iQIYI; YouTube	
Fahlanruk	9MCOT HD; WeTV	
Ghost Host, Ghost House	GMM 25; YouTube	
Hard Love Mission	WeTV	
I Will Knock You	Channel 3; AIS Play	
KinnPorsche	One 31	Full uncut version, titled KinnPorsche: La Forte, was released on iQIYI. Reruns broadcast on Channel 7.
La Cuisine	9MCOT HD; GagaOOLala	
Love Area Part 2	9MCOT HD; GagaOOLala	unresolved or sad ending
Love In The Air	GMM 25	
Love Mechanics	WeTV	
Love Stage!!	Amarin TV; AIS Play	Thai adaptation of the Japanese manga series Love Stage!!.
Magic of Zero	GMM 25; YouTube	
Meow Ears Up	AIS Play; Viki	
My Only 12%	Channel 3; iQIYI	
My Ride	GMM 25; WeTV	
My Secret Love	Channel 3	
My School President	GMM 25; Viu	
Never Let Me Go	GMM 25; YouTube	
Oh! My Sunshine Night	AIS Play	
Our Days	One 31; AIS Play	
Physical Therapy	One 31; AIS Play	
Rak Diao	One 31; YouTube	
Restart(ed)	WeTV, MCOT	
Remember Me	Amarin TV	
Scent of Love	YouTube	
Secret Crush on You	Channel 3; YouTube	
Sky in Your Heart	GMM 25	Following two supporting characters from the universe of Star in My Mind: Jirakit Thawornwong (Mek) as Khuafah; Jiruntanin Trairattanayon (Mark) as Prince
Something in My Room	Channel 3	
Star in My Mind	GMM 25	
That's My Candy	WeTV	
The Eclipse	GMM 25	
The Miracle of Teddy Bear	Channel 3; Netflix	
The Tuxedo	Channel 3; GagaOOLala	
The Warp Effect	GMM 25	
Till the World Ends	Amarin TV; WeTV	
To Sir, With Love	One 31; oneD	
Triage	AIS Play	
Unforgotten Night	GMM 25; iQIYI	
Vice Versa	GMM 25; YouTube	
War of Y	AIS Play	
What Zabb Man!	Amarin TV	
Work From Heart	WeTV	
Why You... Y Me?	YouTube	
You're My Sky	One 31; WeTV	

Thai BL dramas released in 2023
Title	Broadcaster(s)	Notes/Ref.
7 Days Before Valentine	One 31; WeTV	
A Boss and a Babe	GMM 25	
Absolute Zero	iQIYI	
Bake Me Please	Channel 8; TrueID	
Be Mine SuperStar	Channel 3; Viki	
Be My Favorite	GMM 25	
Bed Friend	One 31; Viki	
Beyond the Star	iQIYI	
Boyband	GMM 25	
Chains of Heart	Channel 3; iQIYI	
Cherry Magic	GMM 25	Thai adaptation of the Japanese manga series Cherry Magic! Thirty Years of Virginity Can Make You a Wizard?!, which was also adapted into a live-action TV drama in Japan.
Cooking Crush	GMM 25; WeTV	
Crazy Handsome Rich	9MCOT HD; GagaOOLala	
Cutie Pie 2 You	Workpoint TV	
[[Dangerous Romance]]	GMM 25; Viu	
Dead Friend Forever	One 31; iQIYI	
Destiny Seeker	WeTV	
Dinosaur Love	iQIYI	
For Him	GMM 25; iQIYI	
Future	9MCOT HD; YouTube	
Hidden Agenda	GMM 25; YouTube	
Hit Bite Love	Amarin TV	
House of Stars	One 31; iQIYI	
I Feel You Linger in the Air	One 31; Youku	
La Pluie	One 31	
Last Twilight	GMM 25; YouTube	
Laws of Attraction	One 31; iQIYI	
Love in Translation	One 31; oneD	
Love Syndrome III	Amarin TV; WeTV	
Low Frequency	iQIYI	
Make a Wish	Viu	
The Middleman's Love	One 31; iQIYI	
Moonlight Chicken	GMM 25; Disney+ Hotstar	
My Dear Gangster Oppa	iQIYI	
My Universe	Amarin TV; iQIYI	
Naughty Babe	One 31; iQIYI	
Night Dream	Youku	
Only Friends	GMM 25	
Our Skyy 2	GMM 25	Story 1: "Never Let Me Go" (เพื่อนายแค่หนึ่งเดียว) Story 2: "Star in My Mind" (แล้วแต่ดาว) Story 3: "The Eclipse" (คาธ) Story 4: "Vice Versa" Story 5: "My School President" (แฟนผมเป็นประธานนักเรียน) Story 6: "A Boss and a Babe" (ชอกะเชร์คู่กันต์) Story 7: "Bad Buddy" (แค่เพื่อนครับเพื่อน) Story 8: "Bad Buddy x A Tale of Thousand Stars" (แค่เพื่อนครับเพื่อน x นิทานพันดาว) Story 9: "A Tale of Thousand Stars" (นิทานพันดาว)
Past-Senger	AIS Play; GagaOOLala	
Pit Babe	One 31; iQIYI	
Playboyy	GagaOOLala; iQIYI	
Senior Love Me?	YouTube	
Senior Love Me? 2	YouTube	
Shadow	Viu; GagaOOLala	
Step by Step	One 31; WeTV	
The Luminous Solution	Amarin TV; YouTube	
The Promise	WeTV	
The Sign	Channel 3	
Tin Tem Jai	Channel 3; Viki	
Twins	Channel 3; GagaOOLala	
Venus in the Sky	Amarin TV; iQIYI	
Wedding Plan	GMM 25; iQIYI	
Y Journey: Stay Like a Local	YouTube	

Thai BL dramas released in 2024
Title	Broadcaster(s)	Notes/Ref.
1000 Years Old	Channel 3; WeTV	
4Minutes	One 31; Viu	
A Secretly Love	Channel 3; WeTV	
Addicted Heroin	WeTV	
Bad Guy My Boss	Channel 8	
Battle of the Writers	iQIYI	
Beside You	YouTube	
Century of Love	One 31; Netflix	
City of Stars	One 31; iQIYI	
Close Friend 3: Soju Bomb!	Viu	
Deep Night	GMM 25	
Fourever You	GMM 25	
I Saw You in My Dream	WeTV	
Jack & Joker: U Steal My Heart!	Channel 3; iQIYI	
Kidnap	GMM 25	
Kiseki Chapter 2	Viu	
Knock Knock, Boys!	WeTV	
Love Sea	GMM 25; iQIYI	
Love Sick 2024	9MCOT HD; YouTube	Remake of the 2014 Thai BL series Love Sick.
The Hidden Moon	One 31; WeTV	
The Outing	Viu	Despite the show not being a BL drama, it featured side characters in a BL subplot and is labeled as a BL by several media outlets.
Live In Love	GMM 25; AIS Play	
Memory in the Letter	9MCOT HD; WeTV	
Monster Next Door	WeTV	
My Love Mix-Up!	GMM 25	Thai adaptation of the Japanese manga series My Love Mix-Up!, which was also adapted into a live-action TV drama in Japan.
My Stand-In	iQIYI	
OMG! Vampire	Workpoint TV; WeTV	
Only Boo!	GMM 25	
Spare Me Your Mercy	One 31; oneD	Uncensored version released on iQIYI (in Thailand and other countries), bloome+ from Amazon Prime Video (in Japan) and YouTube (worldwide except in Thailand, Hong Kong and South Korea).
SunsetxVibes	One 31; iQIYI	
The Rebound	Viu	
The Trainee	GMM 25	
This Love Doesn't Have Long Beans	One 31; iQIYI	
Time	Channel 3; WeTV	
To Be Continued	Channel 3; Netflix	
Two Worlds	iQIYI	
Wandee Goodday	GMM 25; Viu	
We Are	GMM 25; iQIYI	
The Heart Killers	GMM 25	Inspired by The Taming of the Shrew by Shakespeare and 10 Things I Hate About You

Thai BL dramas released in 2025
Title	Broadcaster(s)	Notes/Ref.
Boys in Love	GMM 25	
Burnout Syndrome	GMM 25; iQIYI	
Dare You to Death	GMM 25	Uncut version released on Netflix
Doctor's Mine	9 MCOT (Thai TV); GagaOOLala; YouTube	
Flirt Milk	Amarin TV; One 31	
Gelboys	One 31; iQIYI	
Goddess Bless You From Death	One 31; iQIYI	
Head 2 Head	GMM 25; TrueVisions Now	
Khemjira	One 31; iQIYI	
Knock Out	WeTV	
Love Alert	Channel 8; Viu	
Love in the Moonlight	One 31	
Lover Merman	Channel 7	
Me and Thee	GMM 25; iQIYI	
Me and Who	WeTV	
Melody of Secrets	One 31	
Memoir of Rati	GMM 25; Netflix	
My Golden Blood	GMM 25	
My Magic Prophecy	GMM 25; Viu	
My Stubborn	iQIYI	
My Sweetheart Jom	Workpoint TV	
Ossan's Love Thailand	GMM 25	Thai adaptation of the Japanese BL series Ossan's Love.
Rearrange	GagaOOLala; Channel 3 HD	
Reloved	iQIYI; One31	
Reset	iQIYI	
Shine	WeTV; Channel 7	
Sweet Tooth, Good Dentist	GMM 25	
That Summer	One 31	
The Bangkok Boy	WeTV	
The Boy Next World	iQIYI	
The Cursed Love	Channel 3	
The Ex-Morning	GMM 25	
The Last Time	PPTV	
The Love Never Sets	iQIYI	
The Next Prince	GMM 25; iQIYI	
Top Form	WeTV	

Thai BL dramas released in 2026
Title	Broadcaster(s)	Notes/Ref.
A Dog and a Plane	One 31; True Visions Now	
Cat for Cash	GMM 25; TrueVisions Now	
ChermChey	TrueVisions NOW; GagaOOLala	
Class Crush Crisis	One 31; Netflix; OneD	
Decoding You	Channel 3	
Duang with You	One 31	
Don't Be Too Emotional	iQIYI	
Flower Boy	One 31	
Fourever You 2	WeTV	
Fool In Love	iQIYI	
Gelboys	One 31; iQIYI	
Good Boy	GMM 25; OneD	
Gunshot	GMM 25; OneD	
Khemjira Forever	One 31; IQIYi	Mini-sequel to Khemjira
Lately, It's Winter Season		Related Content Fourever You 2
Lost to Light	GMM 25; iQIYI	
Love Destiny	iQIYI; Channel 3	Remake of the 2018 series Love Destiny, which was a major success in Thailand. This version reimagines the story with a male-male lead couple.
Love Like a Bike	Channel 3; GagaOOLala; Netflix	
Love of Silom	WeTV	
Love You Teacher	GMM 25	
Love Upon a Time	One 31	
Lovers & Gangsters	One 31; OneD	
Magic Move	One 31	
Make It Right	MCOT HD (Channel 9); Viu	
Match Point	GMM 25	
Mr. Fanboy	One 31; iQIYI	
My Romance Scammer	GMM 25; WeTV	
Only Friends: Dream On	One 31; OneD	Serves as a standalone series in a shared universe with Only Friends.
Oops! Mysterious Sounds	Workpoint TV; iQIYI	
Payback The Series	One 31; iQIYI	
Peach and Me	GMM 25	Mini-sequel to Me and Thee
Peach Lover	9MCOT HD; iQIYI	
The Crow Club	One 31; Netflix; OneD	
The Edge of Horizon	One 31; GagaOOLala	
The Grim Lover	One 31; Netflix; OneD	
Ticket to Heaven	GMM 25	
Unlucky Bae	GMM 25; Netflix	
When Light Fades	Viu; GagaOOLala	
Weirdo-101	GMM 25; True Visions Now	
When Oranges Fall	GMM 25; OneD	
You Maniac	GMM 25; OneD	
Your Dear Daddy	9MCOT HD; iQIYI	
Your Third	GMM 25; iQIYI	
Teach Me, Touch Me	iQIYI	

=== Upcoming ===
GMMTV

- 17th Spring
- A Season to Remember
- Billionaire Biker
- Boys 4 Moms: Jewelry Design
- Boys 4 Moms: Music Box
- Boys 4 Moms: Secret Garden
- Boys 4 Moms: Water Color
- Cinematch
- Cupid's Ghost
- Fake Boss, Real Boyfriend
- Heartbound
- I Wanna Hold Your Hand (Not fully BL but a heavily BL-centric story)
- I Will Always Save You
- Kiss Me, Remember?
- Love After Class
- Our Lyrics
- Our Melodies
- Pineapple Leaf Blade
- Plan B to U
- Roommate Chaos
- Round One
- Saran Wants You!
- Shrimply Mine
- Stalemate
- Starscope
- The Gentlemen's Blood
- The Halo
- The Invisible Dragon
- The Missing Sunshine
- The Spooky Love Tale
- Twenty One
- Write You Again
- Your Eyes, My Ears

Domundi TV

- 20 Lists
- 30 Days of Us
- Hug E-Lhee: Somtum Rhapsody
- Into Racha
- Magic Lover
- My Merman
- No.1 Student
- Passenger Seat Number X
- Still Holding Up Like the Moon
- The Scent of Sorrow
- You(r)tuber

IQIYi Original

- Ayodhaya Ayawadee
- Don't Peek
- Hook Your Heart
- How Come I Became The Protagonist?
- Identity Zero
- Lock On You
- Lust
- Mr. Dior
- Sword of Lips
- The City of Suits
- The Ghost Family

Be On Cloud

- Manukai

Copy*Bangkok

- See You As a Flower

Star Hunter

- Time Zone

== Other countries ==
=== China ===
Year	Title	Broadcaster(s)	Notes/Ref.
2015	Mr. X and I	Blued; YouTube	
2015	Mr. X and I 2	Youku; Blued	cliff hanger bittersweet or sad ending
2015	Counterattack: Falling In Love With A Rival	Tencent Video	Original Adaptation of Revenged Love 2025
2016	Addicted	iQIYI; YouTube	Cancelled and banned unfinished BL Series
2016	A Round Trip to Love		Original Adaptation of Double Helix 2026 cliff hanger bittersweet or sad ending
2016	Uncontrolled Love - Irresistible Love: Secret of the Valet	YouTube	
2016	Uncontrolled Love - Irresistible Love 2	YouTube	
2017	Advance Bravely	Tencent Video	
2017	Till Death Tear Us Apart	Tencent Video	
2018	Guardian	Youku	cliff hanger bittersweet or sad ending
2019	The Untamed	Tencent Video	Episodes were released outside of China on Viki and Netflix.
2020	Capture Lover	Viki	
2020	Honey Sir	Blued; YouTube	
2021	Word of Honor	Youku	
2021	Killer and Healer	Mango TV	cliff hanger bittersweet or sad ending
2022	In Your Heart	Viki; GagaOOLala	cliff hanger bittersweet or sad ending
2023	Stay With Me	Viki; GagaOOLala	cliff hanger bittersweet or sad ending
2024	Blue Canvas of Youthful Days	iQIYI; Viki; GagaOOLala	
2025	ABO Desire	Viki; GagaOOLala	
2025	I'll Turn Back This Time	GagaOOLala; YouTube	cliff hanger bittersweet or sad ending
2025	Revenged Love	Viki; GagaOOLala	
2025	To My Shore	Viki; GagaOOLala	
2025	Kill to Love	GagaOOLala	is officially classified as a Singaporean series to bypass strict Chinese television censorship, which heavily restricts LGBTQ+ (Boys' Love/BL) themes.
2026	Love After Addiction	Rakuten TV - GagaOOLala	
2026	Sammy's Children's Day	Viki, GagaOOlala	cliff hanger bittersweet or sad ending
2026	Feel What You Feel	Viki, GagaOOlala	
2026	The Gaze	Viki, GagaOOlala	
2026	Double Helix	Viki, GagaOOlala	
2026	Journey with You	GagaOOLala	
2026	Deep In	Viki, GagaOOlala	
2026	Bittersweet Love	Viki	
2026	Ash	Youku	
2026	The Last Oath	Gagaoola	
TBA	Eternal Faith	iQIYI	

=== Hong Kong ===
Year	Title	Broadcaster(s)	Notes/Ref.
2021	Ossan's Love HK	ViuTV	Hong Kong adaptation of the Japanese BL drama Ossan's Love.
2023	My Colleague at BL Shop Might Be The Meant-To-Be	YouTube	

=== Laos ===
Year	Title	Broadcaster(s)	Notes/Ref.
2021	One Love	Facebook	

=== Philippines ===
Year	Title	Broadcaster(s)	Notes/Ref.
2020	Ben X Jim	YouTube; Upstream PH	Reruns broadcast on Heart of Asia Channel in 2021.
2020	Boys' Lockdown	Ticket2Me; YouTube	Reruns broadcast on Heart of Asia Channel in 2021.
2020	Gameboys	YouTube	Re-edited version, titled Gameboys Level-Up Edition, was released on Netflix. Reruns broadcast on Heart of Asia Channel in 2021.
2020	Gaya Sa Pelikula	YouTube; Netflix	
2020	Hello Stranger	YouTube; Facebook; iWantTFC	
2020	My Extraordinary	TV5	
2020	Oh, Mando!	iWantTFC	
2020	Sakristan	YouTube	
2021	Love Beneath the Stars	iWantTFC	Sequel to the Filipino BL film The Boy Foretold by the Stars (2020).
2022	Rainbow Prince	YouTube	Reruns broadcast on Heart of Asia Channel.
2024	Sky Valley	YouTube	

=== Singapore ===
Year	Title	Broadcaster(s)	Notes/Ref.
2022	Getaway	YouTube	
2025	Kill to Love	GagaOOLala	
2026	Lost to You	GagaOOLala	

=== Vietnam ===
Year	Title	Broadcaster(s)	Notes/Ref.
2022	The Star Always Follow You	YouTube	
2024	Under the Oak Tree	YouTube	
2025	Fight for Love	YouTube	

== See also ==
- Boys' love
- Boys' love fandom
- Lists of television programs with LGBT characters
- Homoeroticism
