= Secret Relationships =

2025 South Korean television series

- Promotional poster
- Hangul: 비밀사이
- Hanja: 祕密사이
- RR: Bimilsai
- MR: Pimilsai
- Genre: BL; Romance; Workplace
- Created by: Jeong Soo-yun
- Based on: Secret Relationship by McQueen Studio
- Written by: Lee Yoo-jin
- Directed by: Yang Kyung-hee
- Starring: Kim Jun-seo; Cha Sun-hyung; Cha Jung-woo; Kim Ho-young
- Country of origin: South Korea
- Original language: Korean
- No. of episodes: 8

Production
- Production companies: Playlist Studio; Fuji Television; Kakao Entertainment

Original release
- Network: Watcha
- Release: February 27 – March 21, 2025

Secret Relationships (Korean: 비밀사이) is a 2025 South Korean BL romance workplace television series created by Jeong Soo-yun, written by Lee Yoo-jin, directed by Yang Kyung-hee, and starring Kim Jun-seo, Cha Sun-hyung, Cha Jung-woo, and Kim Ho-young. Based on the Kakao webtoon of the same name by McQueen Studio, it depicts the complicated relationship between Da-on and the three men surrounding him. It was released on Watcha from February 27, to March 21, 2025. It is also available for streaming on FOD in Japan, iQIYI in the Americas, and GagaOOLala and Heavenly in selected regions.

== Synopsis ==
Jung Da-on has a difficult financial background. This has shaped his life and occasionally causes misunderstandings with others who view his resourcefulness negatively. He works hard to overcome his past and create a brighter future for himself. He finds himself in a love triangle with two men, Shin Jae-min and Joo Sung-hyun. Jae-min tutored Da-on in high school. He has helped Da-on through difficult times, and Da-on trusts and relies on him. Da-on harbors lingering feelings for Jae-min. Sung-hyun is Da-on's work colleague. They initially have a strained relationship, but Sung-hyun develops feelings for Da-on and tries to be open and honest about his feelings. Da-on struggles with his feelings for both men. He is grateful to Jae-min for his previous support and still has feelings for him. At the same time, he is drawn to Sung-hyun's genuine and caring personality.

== Cast and characters ==
- Kim Jun-seo as Jung Da-on

A young man who's worked hard to overcome a difficult financial background. He's resourceful and determined, but sometimes his past experiences lead to misunderstandings with others. He finds himself in a tricky situation, caught between his feelings for his former tutor and a new attraction to his colleague.

- Cha Sun-hyung as Joo Sung-hyun

Da-on's work colleague. Initially, they have a somewhat antagonistic relationship. However, he develops feelings for Da-on and is very open and honest about his affections. He seems to be a more straightforward and caring individual.

- Cha Jung-woo as Kim Soo-hyun

A man who grows while experiencing wounds and pain.

- Kim Ho-young as Shin Jae-min

Da-on's tutor in high school. He provided support and guidance during Da-on's difficult times, and Da-on still has strong feelings for him.

== Production ==
=== Development ===
In July 2022, Cradle Studio, a now-defunct (Note: Cradle Studio was liquidated in June 2024.) subsidiary of Kakao Entertainment, announced that they were pushing forward to dramatize the BL webtoon Secret Relationships written by McQueen Studio. Five months later, the production of the series was confirmed.

In November 2024, it was reported that Playlist Studio would be producing its first BL drama along with Kakao Entertainment and Fuji Television. Writer Jeong Soo-yun, who wrote Hope or Dope (2022) and Tastefully Yours (2025), participates as the creator. The series is written by Lee Yoo-jin, who worked with Jeong, and directed by Yang Kyung-hee, who has worked on numerous BL dramas such as Love Tractor (2023) and The Time of Fever (2024).

=== Casting and filming ===
The cast lineup were revealed to be Kim Jun-seo in his first lead role along with Cha Sun-hyung, Cha Jung-woo, and Kim Ho-young. Principal photography began on November 9.

== Release ==
Secret Relationships was scheduled to be released in the first quarter of 2025. Watcha announced that it would be their first exclusive series on their platform in 2025. The release date was confirmed to be on February 27. It will also be available for streaming on FOD in Japan, iQIYI in the Americas, and GagaOOLala and Heavenly in selected regions.

== Accolades ==
=== Listicles ===
Year-end lists for Secret Relationships
Critic/Publication	List	Rank	Ref.
Teen Vogue	13 Best BL Dramas of 2025	Included	
Queerty	10 Best BL Dramas of 2025	Included	
