= Season of Love in Shimane =

- Promotional poster
- Ai no Kisetsu ฤดูกาลแห่งรัก in Shimane
- Genre: Boys' love Romance; Comedy
- Country of origin: Thailand
- No. of episodes: 8

Production
- Production location: Japan
- Running time: 30 minutes
- Production company: 9Naa Production

Original release
- Network: Viu GagaOOLala
- Release: May 11 – June 29, 2025

Season of Love in Shimane is a Thai boys' love (BL) web drama series produced by 9Naa Production. The series follows the journey of love and self-improvement of the main characters as they navigate their feelings amidst new relationships and career aspirations. It is a Viu Original Series.

The series is a continuation of the web drama KISEKI in Tokyo Chapter 2.

== Synopsis ==
Following a life-changing trip to Tokyo, P and Pan-Plai find their feelings evolving in unexpected ways. A year later, P has moved to Shimane and established himself as a travel blogger, dedicating himself to personal growth as he once promised Pan. Meanwhile, Pan-Plai pursues his dream of becoming an artist and singer, gaining popularity and a loyal fan base.

Despite leading separate lives, P holds onto the hope of reconnecting with Pan. When he learns that Pan will return to Japan, he eagerly anticipates their reunion—only to be met with new challenges. Alongside Pan’s return comes the arrival of a young artist and a manager Tontae, both of whom fit the mold of Pan’s "ideal couple." P must navigate this new dynamic and prove that his affection can withstand the test of time.

== Cast ==
- Ekkapop Ta-ta as P
- Jirachot Chotthikhamporn as Pan
- Krisana PanJai as Pan’s manager
- Chatrin Chotikhamporn as Plai

== Release ==
The series broadcast from 11th May 2025 to 6th July 2025, with episodes airing every Sunday at 20:00 Bangkok Time on GagaOOLala and Viu.
