= Smile After Tears =

Taiwanese BL drama television series (2026)

- 轉過頭，幫你擦眼淚
- Genre: Drama; Fantasy; Boys' love (BL); Romance
- Directed by: Jiang Bing Chen (姜秉辰)
- Starring: Zhang Junjia (張鈞嘉); He Yankai (禾雁凱); Zheng Diaoqin (鄭彫秦)
- Country of origin: Taiwan
- Original language: Mandarin
- No. of seasons: 1
- No. of episodes: 12

Production
- Running time: 25–29 minutes
- Production company: Tipa Entertainment (踢帕娛樂)

Original release
- Network: Hami Video (Taiwan); iQIYI (international); GagaOOLala (international)
- Release: 20 May 2026 – present

Smile After Tears (Chinese: 轉過頭，幫你擦眼淚) is a Taiwanese television series blending drama, fantasy and boys' love (BL), starring Zhang Junjia, He Yankai and Zheng Diaoqin. The series is the first BL production from Tipa Entertainment, directed by Jiang Bing Chen.

The series premiered on 20 May 2026, airing weekly on Wednesdays. On premiere day, two episodes were released, followed by one episode per week. It is available on platforms including Hami Video (Taiwan), iQIYI and GagaOOLala (international), as well as U-NEXT (Japan) and wavve, WATCHA, TVING and Heavenly (South Korea).

== Synopsis ==
Zhang Junjia is a transfer student who always uses a smile to hide the financial and emotional difficulties he faces. When he joins the school band, he meets He Yankai, the charismatic and reserved lead singer who suffers from a congenital heart condition. Despite their differences, the two grow closer through music, developing a strong connection.

However, a car accident abruptly ends their relationship. Yankai dies, leaving Junjia in deep mourning. Unable to accept the loss, Junjia continues to send daily messages to Yankai's phone number. Meanwhile, Yankai's spirit awakens in a mysterious space, where a "ferryman" informs him that his mission is not to change fate but to help Junjia find a way to move forward.

With the support of Zheng Diaoqin, a basketball team member who has always been by his side, Junjia gradually rediscovers his passion for music. The series follows his healing journey, showing how he copes with loss and finally learns to say goodbye.

== Cast ==
=== Main ===
- Zhang Junjia (張鈞嘉) as Zhang Junjia
- He Yankai (禾雁凱) as He Yankai
- Zheng Diaoqin (鄭彫秦) as Zheng Diaoqin

=== Special appearances ===
- Qiu Sheng Yi (王子 邱勝翊) as the ferryman

== Production ==
The series was produced by Tipa Entertainment and directed by Jiang Bing Chen. Filming took place over 30 days, following two months of acting training. The final scene was completed around 4 a.m.

The final episode features a kiss between the main characters, filmed using a "safety kiss" technique (安全之吻), where a transparent barrier separated the actors.

To achieve the final crying scene for Zhang Junjia's character, the production team used an emotional isolation technique, instructing other cast and crew members to ignore him during filming.

== Release ==
The series premiered on 20 May 2026, with the first two episodes released simultaneously. Thereafter, one new episode was released every Wednesday. The series is available on Hami Video in Taiwan, and internationally on iQIYI and GagaOOLala. In Japan, it is distributed by U-NEXT, and in South Korea on wavve, WATCHA, TVING and Heavenly.
