= Blue Canvas of Youthful Days =

2024 Chinese television series

- Official poster
- Chinese: 路过我年少时光的蓝色
- Literally: Blue Canvas of Youthful Days
- Genre: Drama; Romance; Boys' love; Youth
- Written by: Li Xi
- Directed by: Li Xi; Ning Yuan Yuan
- Starring: Zhang Xuan Yu; Guo Jia Le; Yao Xing Hao; Xiao Zi Zhuo
- Country of origin: China
- Original language: Mandarin
- No. of episodes: 12

Production
- Running time: 28 minutes

Original release
- Network: GagaOOLala; YouTube; Viki; iQIYI
- Release: 26 October – 1 December 2024

Blue Canvas of Youthful Days (Chinese: 路过我年少时光的蓝色; pinyin: Lu Guo Wo Shao Nian Shi Guang De Lan Se) is a 2024 Chinese boys' love drama television series starring Zhang Xuan Yu, Guo Jia Le, Yao Xing Hao and Xiao Zi Zhuo. The series was directed by Li Xi and Ning Yuan Yuan.

The series premiered on iQIYI on 6 August 2024. It was removed from the platform the following day.

The series was released internationally on 26 October 2024 through GagaOOLala, Viki, iQIYI and the YouTube channel YoYo English Channel.

== Synopsis ==
Qi Lu (Guo Jia Le) comes from a family of artists and studies painting under his father's guidance. During his final year of high school, he joins Liu Mingyang's (Yao Xing Hao) art studio, where he meets Qin Xiao (Zhang Xuan Yu), a young artist who helps support his family by selling his work.

Qi Lu later learns that Qin Xiao is the artist known online as "Lan" ("Blue"). As they spend more time together, the two develop a romantic relationship.

== Cast ==
=== Main ===
- Zhang Xuan Yu as Qin Xiao
- Guo Jia Le as Qi Lu
- Yao Xing Hao as Liu Mingyang
- Xiao Zi Zhuo as Tan Yin

=== Supporting ===
- Li Jue Xuan as Sun Xiaorui
- Hu Ze Ming as Wei Jiayu
- Xu Ri Dong Sheng as young Qin Lu
- Xu Xiao Mei as Qin Lu's mother
- Duan Zhi Ning as Qin Lu's father
- Zhang Guang Bin as Qin Xiao's grandfather
- Yuan Yuan as Liu Mingyang's mother

== Original soundtrack ==
Blue Canvas of Youthful Days soundtrack
No.	Title	Artist	Length
1.	"Us (我们)"	Yan Er (言耳)
2.	"Tian Le Convenience Store (天乐杂货店)"	Yan Er (言耳)
3.	"Love (爱)"	Various artists
4.	"End of Summer (未至的夏天)"	Various artists
5.	"Fool's Dream (痴人做梦)"	Various artists
6.	"How Good (多好)"	Various artists
7.	"How Good (Instrumental) (多好)"	Instrumental
8.	"Us (Instrumental) (我们)"	Instrumental

== Production ==
The series was directed by Li Xi and Ning Yuan Yuan, with Li Xi also serving as screenwriter. It premiered on iQIYI on 6 August 2024 with four episodes before being removed from the platform the following day. International distribution began on 26 October 2024 through GagaOOLala, Viki, iQIYI and YouTube. Episodes were released weekly, with two episodes released each weekend for a total of twelve episodes.

== Reception ==
On Viki, Blue Canvas of Youthful Days has a user rating of 9.0 out of 10 based on more than 7,000 reviews as of May 2026.

A review from Rakuten TV News praised the gradual development of the relationship between Qi Lu and Qin Xiao and noted the recurring use of blue tones throughout the series to reflect the characters' emotions.

Boys Love Insider praised the performances of Guo Jia Le and Zhang Xuan Yu and the portrayal of Qi Lu and Qin Xiao's relationship, while criticizing the series' editing, pacing and ending. The BL Xpress described the series as an unusually open Chinese BL production, highlighting its character development and performances while criticizing the ending and parts of the secondary storyline.

== Accolades ==
=== Listicles ===
Year-end lists for Blue Canvas of Youthful Days
Publication	List	Rank	Ref.
BreakTudo	27 Best BLs of 2024	Included	
