= Love Class 3 =

South Korean BL television series

- Promotional poster
- Hangul: 수업중입니다 3
- RR: Sueop jungimnida 3
- MR: Suŏp chungimnida 3
- Genre: Boys' love; Coming-of-age
- Written by: Kang Young-sun; Jang Young-sun
- Directed by: Lee Seok-yong
- Country of origin: South Korea
- Original language: Korean
- No. of episodes: 16

Production
- Production company: Box Media

Original release
- Network: Wavve; Watcha
- Release: May 28 – July 17, 2026

Related
- Love Class (2022); Love Class 2 (2023)

Love Class 3 (Korean: 수업중입니다 시즌 3) is a South Korean boys' love television series produced by Box Media. It is the third installment of the Love Class franchise and has been described by Korean media as the first Korean BL drama series to reach a third season.

The series stars Sae Byeol, Seo Yi-han, Lee Woo-jin, and Thai actor Panutuch Saelee.

The series premiered on May 28, 2026, through Wavve, Watcha, Rakuten Viki, Viu, GagaOOLala and Channel K, with distribution in more than 190 countries worldwide.

== Premise ==
The series follows aspiring K-pop idols navigating their careers, ambitions, and relationships. During an idol survival competition, Hyun-jae and Su-an develop feelings for one another. However, only Hyun-jae succeeds in debuting, forcing them onto separate paths.

Years later, they reunite through a professional project and must confront lingering feelings while navigating the pressures of the entertainment industry.

Meanwhile, Jaemin struggles to rebuild his reputation after a scandal, while Khun, a Thai artist, moves to South Korea seeking a fresh start. As the two grow closer, they must decide whether to pursue their feelings despite the risks posed by the competitive idol industry.

== Cast ==
=== Main ===
- Sae Byeol as Kim Hyun-jae
- Seo Yi-han as Yun Su-an
- Lee Woo-jin as Lee Jae-min
- Panutuch Saelee (Petch) as Khun

=== Special appearances ===
- Kim Ye-eun as Ye-eun, a friend of Su-an (Episode 1)
- Lee Joo-han as Director Choi
- Lee Bong-ha as a professor of Media Studies
- Go Hyeon as himself, member of WAKER (Episode 1)
- Kwon Hyup as himself, member of WAKER (Episode 1)
- Lee Jun as himself, member of WAKER (Episode 1)
- Leo as himself, member of WAKER (Episode 1)
- Se Bum as himself, member of WAKER (Episode 1)

== Production ==
In January 2026, South Korean media reported that Sae Byeol, a member of the boy group WAKER, and Lee Woo-jin, a member of GHOST9, had been cast in the lead roles for the third season of the series.

According to Box Media, the third season shifts away from the university setting featured in previous installments and instead focuses on the K-pop idol industry, exploring the challenges faced by young performers as they pursue their dreams while navigating fame and romantic relationships.

The series also marks the participation of Thai actor Panutuch Saelee in a South Korean BL production with international distribution.

== Release ==
Love Class 3 premiered on May 28, 2026, through Wavve and Watcha in South Korea, while international distribution was handled by Rakuten Viki, Viu, GagaOOLala and Channel K.

The series consists of sixteen episodes and is released twice weekly on Thursdays and Fridays.

According to Rakuten Viki, the series was released simultaneously in more than 190 countries, making it one of the widest international launches for a South Korean BL production.

== Reception ==
The premiere received extensive coverage from South Korean entertainment media, which highlighted the casting of active K-pop idols in leading roles and the fact that Love Class became the first Korean BL franchise to reach a third season.

During Pride Month 2026, Rakuten Viki promoted the series internationally as one of its featured BL releases, citing its appeal to both K-pop fans and global BL audiences.
