= Secret Lover =

Secret Lover may refer to:

- Secret Lover (TV series), a 2025 Taiwanese boys' love series
- The Secret Lover (L'amante segreta), a 1941 Italian drama film
- "Secret Lover", a 2004 song by Admiral T, featuring Lynnsha and Wyclef Jean
- "Secret Lover", a 2005 song by Kelly Osbourne from Sleeping in the Nothing

== See also ==
- "Secret Lovers", a 1985 song by Atlantic Starr
- The Secret Lovers, a 2005 South Korean TV drama series
- The Secret Lovers (novel), a 1977 novel by Charles McCarry
