= The Last Oath =

2026 Hong Kong television series

- Official poster
- Traditional Chinese: 末誓
- Literal meaning: The Last Oath
- Genre: Drama; Horror; Thriller; Action; Romance; Boys' love
- Starring: Chen Ming Hao; Chen Liang; Lu Lu; Wang Chaoyang
- Country of origin: Hong Kong
- Original language: Mandarin
- No. of episodes: 24

Production
- Running time: 20–24 minutes

Original release
- Network: GagaOOLala, Viki
- Release: 4 September – 24 October 2026

The Last Oath (Chinese: 末誓) is a 2026 Hong Kong television series in the genres of drama, horror, thriller, action, romance, and boys' love (BL), directed by Ben Jin and starring Chen Ming Hao, Chen Liang, Lu Lu, and Wang Chaoyang.

The series premiered on September 4, 2026, and is internationally available on GagaOOLala, Viki, and the production's official YouTube channel.

== Synopsis ==
In a world devastated by a zombie virus, college student Lin Zai loses his parents and elder brother. He later discovers that he is immune to zombie bites, making him a valuable target for different groups competing for control of vaccine research.

A Lie, a special agent tasked with capturing Lin Zai, is seriously wounded and ends up being rescued by him. The relationship between hunter and target gradually develops into an alliance as the two struggle to survive in a post-apocalyptic world marked by zombies, power conflicts, and divided loyalties.

== Cast ==
=== Main ===
- Chen Ming Hao as A Lie
- Chen Liang as Lin Zai
- Lu Lu as He Yao
- Wang Chaoyang as Sheng Changhuan

== Production ==
The Last Oath is directed by Ben Jin and stars Chen Ming Hao, Chen Liang, Lu Lu, and Wang Chaoyang.

The production was conceived as a BL series set in a post-apocalyptic setting, combining elements of survival, zombie horror, action, and romance.

== Release and streaming ==
The series premiered worldwide on September 4, 2026, and was planned to consist of 24 episodes, with new episodes released on Fridays and Saturdays.

On September 25, 2026, Filmibeat reported that episodes 13 and 14 were scheduled for release that same day on Viki and GagaOOLala.

The series is available on GagaOOLala, Viki, and the production's official YouTube channel.

== Reception ==
In September 2026, the series ranked third in GagaOOLala's Mandarin BL viewership ranking for September 4–10.

BroadwayWorld highlighted The Last Oath as one of the Mandarin BL releases gaining attention on GagaOOLala and associated the series with the expansion of the genre into other formats, including zombie survival stories.

A review published by Abstract AF after the first four episodes described the series as a zombie BL romantic thriller and highlighted its combination of horror, survival, and romance, as well as the performances and chemistry of its lead actors.
