= The On1y One =

2024 Taiwanese television series

- Promotional poster
- Genre: Teen drama Boys' love
- Based on: Mou Mou (某某) by Mu Su Li
- Screenplay by: Wang You Zhen; Kuang-hui Liu
- Directed by: Kuang-hui Liu
- Starring: Liu Dong Qin; Benjamin Tsang
- Opening theme: "Love Proverbs" by 831
- Country of origin: Taiwan
- Original language: Mandarin
- No. of episodes: 12

Production
- Producers: Ken Xu; Kuang-hui Liu; Peter Bien; Muir Chang; Johnny Liang; Albee Huang; Iris Wu
- Running time: 50 minutes

Original release
- Network: Netflix; iQIYI; Viki; WeTV; GagaOOLala
- Release: August 22 – September 26, 2024

The On1y One (Chinese: 某某; pinyin: móu móu; lit. 'a certain someone'), is a 2024 Taiwanese television drama series starring Liu Dong Qin and Benjamin Tsang, and directed by Kuang-hui Liu. It is based on the 2020 danmei web novel named 某某 Mou Mou/A Certain Someone written by Mu Su Li (木苏里) and serialized on the Chinese online platform Jinjiang Literature City. The series premiered globally on August 22, 2024 on OTT platforms including Netflix, iQIYI, Viki, WeTV, and GagaOOLala.

== Synopsis ==
Sheng Wang's life becomes challenging when he changes schools and immediately clashes with his classmate, Jiang Tian. Things take a significant turn when Sheng Wang's father and Jiang Tian's mother decide to get married, making the two boys live together under one roof as stepbrothers. Now, Sheng Wang and Jiang Tian must navigate their new family and school life together. Unexpectedly, as the both become closer, they also find themselves developing romantic feelings for each other.

== Cast and characters ==
=== Main ===
- Liu Dong Qin as Sheng Wang
- Benjamin Tsang as Jiang Tian

=== Supporting ===
- Duan Chun-hao as Sheng Min Yang: Sheng Wang's father
- Jennifer Hong as Jiang Ou: Jiang Tian's mother
- Jie-en Yu as Pang Xie/Crab: Sheng Wang's old classmate and friend
- Andy Chen Yan-ting as Gao Tian Yang: Jiang Tian and Sheng Wang's classmate and friend
- Adam Cai as Song Si Rui: Jiang Tian and Sheng Wang's classmate and friend
- Jed Chung as Xu Tian Shu/Little Mouth Xu: Jiang Tian and Sheng Wang's classmate and friend
- Mimi Shao as Li Yu: Jiang Tian and Sheng Wang's classmate and friend
- Pipi Yao as Li Jia/Pepper: Jiang Tian and Sheng Wang's classmate and friend
- Tim Cheng as Qi Jia Hao: Jiang Tian and Sheng Wang's classmate
- Stan Huang as Shi Yu: Jiang Tian and Sheng Wang's dormmate
- Lin Shih-en as Director Xu/Big Mouth Xu: Jiang Tian and Sheng Wang's school director and father of Xu Tian Shu
- Zach Lu as He Jin: Jiang Tian and Sheng Wang's teacher and adviser
- Lu Tingyu as Jenny Yang Jing: Jiang Tian and Sheng Wang's English teacher
- Chen Yingju as Zhao Cai: Jiang Tian and Sheng Wang's Literature teacher
- Samuel Ku as Zhao Xi: Jiang Tian and Sheng Wang's friend and Physics teacher
- Kenny Yen as Lin Bei Ting/Benny: Jiang Tian and Sheng Wang's Geography teacher
- Bruce Chen Wei-min as Zhao Lao Ban: father of Zhao Xi and owner of Xi Le convenience store
- Wu Chen-ya as Uncle Mute: mute employee of Xi Le convenience store
- Yu An-shun as Grandpa Ding Lao Tou: grandfather-like and one of Jiang Tian's past neighbors
- Chris Lee as Ji Huan Yu: Jiang Tian's father

== Episodes ==
No.	Title	Original release date
1	"Beginning: You're Not My Brother"	August 22, 2024
Jiang Tian moves into Sheng Wang's home and Sheng Wang has to accept the fact that he has a new 'older brother'.
2	"Closer: It's Only 4 Lips Touching Together"	August 22, 2024
Jiang Tian and Sheng Wang, who are often at each other's throats, become closer during a game.
3	"Actually: We Can Give It A Go"	August 28, 2024
When Sheng Wang catches a cold and gets drunk, Jiang Tian quietly pays attention to and cares for him.
4	"Splendor: At The End Of The World"	August 29, 2024
Jiang Tian and Sheng Wang are punished for getting in a fight, and Jiang Tian begins to review Sheng Wang's homework for him.
5	"Closed: Waiting For The Wind"	September 4, 2024
Sheng Wang gets beat up before an exam, and Jiang Tian helps him fight for justice.
6	"Plan: When To Open For Business"	September 5, 2024
Jiang Tian realizes that Sheng Wang seems to have deliberately distanced himself from him, which leads him to action.
7	"Belonging: Let's Live On Campus"	September 11, 2024
Sheng Wang learns about Jiang Tian's childhood story from Grandpa Ding, and the two teens inform their parents of an important decision.
8	"Sparkle: Teenagers"	September 12, 2024
Jiang Tian and Sheng Wang move into the dormitory as they had hoped, and the change gives Jiang Tian the strength to become warmer and open up.
9	"Naked: The Blossom Of Youth"	September 18, 2024
An uninvited guest shows up at the sports competition, while Sheng Wang is injured during one of the events.
10	"Thief: Who Crossed The Boundary?"	September 19, 2024
Sheng Wang is forced to rest at home after injuring his foot, but he still misses Jiang Tian; Jenny Yang starts to have a crush on Lin Bei Ting.
11	"Kiss: It's Only 4 Lips Touching Together?"	September 25, 2024
Jiang Tian and Sheng Wang accidentally get locked in the gymnasium; Sheng Wang accidentally overhears a conversation between Zhao Xi and Lin Bei Ting.
12	"New Beginning: Pain Is Necessary For Rebirth"	September 26, 2024
Sheng Wang fails on his mock exam, and the result puts more and more distance between him and Jiang Tian.

== Accolades ==
Name of the award ceremony, year presented, category, nominee of the award, and the result of the nomination
Award ceremony	Year	Category	Nominee / Work	Result	Ref.
HUB Awards	2024	Highlight of the Year - Taiwan	The On1y One	Won	

=== Listicles ===
Year-end lists for The On1y One
Critic/Publication	List	Rank	Ref.
Soompi	12 of the Best BL Dramas Released in 2024	Included	
Teen Vogue	13 Best BL Dramas of 2024	Included	
