= Wishing Upon the Shooting Stars =

2026 Taiwanese television series

- 向流星許願的我們
- Genre: BL; Fantasy; Romance
- Directed by: Jiang Ruizhi
- Starring: Zhong Yuexuan; Chu Menghsuan; Yu Jieen; Gewu Xiaotai; Li Liren; Qiu Kaiwei; Cao Lan
- Country of origin: Taiwan
- Original language: Mandarin
- No. of seasons: 1
- No. of episodes: 12

Production
- Producers: Pan Xinhui; Xu Weiting
- Running time: 30–41 minutes
- Production companies: YYS Media; Dú Yǐng Zhìzuò

Original release
- Network: LINE TV
- Release: March 26 – June 4, 2026

Wishing Upon the Shooting Stars (Chinese: 向流星許願的我們; pinyin: Xiàng liúxīng xǔyuàn de wǒmen) is a Taiwanese BL fantasy romance television series produced by YYS Media and Dú Yǐng Zhìzuò, directed by Jiang Ruizhi. The series is based on the work 觀看流星的正確方式 by writer Zhong Minrui, published by Chiu Ko Publishing House. It is the fifth BL production by YYS Media, following Be Loved in House and Unknown. The series premiered on March 26, 2026, exclusively in Taiwan on LINE TV and internationally on Viki and GagaOOLala.

== Synopsis ==
The story follows a disillusioned young man who returns to his hometown on an island. In a moment of despair, he wishes upon a shooting star to "disappear." The next day, he wakes up in a new body and discovers that he has been completely forgotten by everyone. On this fantastic journey, he reunites with his old high school love, and together they seek to reconnect and heal from past traumas.

== Cast ==
=== Main ===
- Zhong Yuexuan as He Xiangyong / Zhong Xiaoyou
- Chu Menghsuan as Chen Haowei
- Yu Jieen as Li Wanzhe
- Gewu Xiaotai as Hamaguchi Canghai (Hama-chan)

=== Recurring ===
- Li Liren as Uncle He (Lao He)
- Qiu Kaiwei as Uncle Hua (island doctor)
- Cao Lan as Angela (ice shop owner, Li Wanzhe's mother)
- Chen Yanxu as young He Xiangyong (age 18)

=== Special appearances ===
- Fang Yuxin as Xixi
- Wu Yueqing as Uncle Ahong

== Soundtrack ==
No.	Title	Artist	Length
1.	"頻率" (Opening theme)	Xiao Bingchih	3:07
2.	"吹散" (Ending theme)	Hong Weizhe	3:49
3.	"海的盡頭沒有燈塔" (Main theme)	Ray Huang Tingrui
4.	"走到和你說好的地方" (Soundtrack)	Xu Weixiang	4:15
5.	"就好" (Soundtrack)	Hong Weizhe	3:40
6.	"聽我說" (Soundtrack)	Huang Fengming	3:01
7.	"我在這荒蕪的世界裡奔跑可你不在" (Soundtrack)	Huang Fengming	3:16
8.	"找到我" (Soundtrack)	PoLin	2:33
9.	"瓶中信" (Soundtrack)	Chi Ke Hu Wei Dui	2:23
10.	"送你一枝花" (Soundtrack)	Chi Ke Hu Wei Dui, Tingwei	3:01
11.	"在你還記得我之前" (Soundtrack)	Qiu Yuchen

== Reception ==
The series was presented at the Tokyo International Film Festival (TIFFCOM 2025), where the four main actors participated in promotional activities. Taiwanese media highlighted the chemistry between the actors and the international interest in the production.

=== Controversy ===
In May 2025, actor Chen Xiangxi was investigated on suspicion of evading mandatory military service in Taiwan, being taken in for questioning during filming. The production decided to remove his scenes and replace him with Chu Menghsuan in the role. Producer Pan Xinhui stated that the company suffered losses and filed a lawsuit against the actor.
