= Our Dating Sim (TV series) =

2023 South Korean television series

- Promotional poster
- Hangul: 우리 연애 시뮬레이션
- Lit.: Our dating simulation
- RR: Uri yeonae simyulleisyeon
- MR: Uri yŏnae simyulleisyŏn
- Genre: BL; Romance
- Written by: Lee Yoon-seul
- Directed by: Lim Hyun-hee
- Starring: Lee Jong-hyuk; Lee Seung-gyu
- Country of origin: South Korea
- Original language: Korean
- No. of episodes: 8

Production
- Running time: 15 minutes
- Production company: Studio Winsome

Original release
- Network: Naver Series On; Heavenly; Rakuten TV; Viki; GagaOOLala
- Release: March 9 – March 30, 2023

Our Dating Sim (Korean: 우리 연애 시뮬레이션) is a 2023 South Korean streaming television BL drama series starring Lee Jong-hyuk and Lee Seung-gyu. Two episodes were released each Thursday from March 9 to March 30, 2023, on various OTT media services in South Korea such as Naver Series On, Heavenly, and globally through Rakuten TV, Viki, and GagaOOLala.

== Synopsis ==
Lee Wan (Lee Jong-hyuk) and Shin Ki-tae (Lee Seung-gyu) were friends in school. Just before graduation, Wan's family was about to move to Daejeon when Ki-tae texted him to invite him for a drink with his friends and bring his camera along. Wan went to school at the last minute, confessed his feelings to Ki-tae, and kissed him. Feeling embarrassed, Wan ran away, hid in the stockroom, threw his camera, and left without saying goodbye. He also stopped communicating with Ki-tae. However, Ki-tae found the camera and has longed to find Wan ever since.

Seven years later, Wan is now an illustrator who uploads his drawings on his blog. He returned to Seoul to look for a job and got an interview at a company where Ki-tae, who now goes by the name Eddy, works as a programmer. When the company hired Wan, he later learned that the supporter of his blog, Gameboy, was none other than Ki-tae, who recommended him for the job. As they worked together on a new date-themed video game project, they both realized that their feelings for each other were mutual.

== Cast ==
=== Main ===
- Lee Jong-hyuk as Lee Wan/Ian
- Lee Seung-gyu as Shin Ki-tae/Eddy

=== Supporting ===
- Jeong Jin-woo as Tae-oh
- Sung Ryung as Sunny
- Park Si-young as Jamie
- Yoo Seong-yong as Producer Ahn
- Kim So-young as Lee Yeon

=== Others ===
- Lee Jung-in as high school friends of Shin Ki-tae and Lee Wan
- Lee Jeong-chan as high school friends of Shin Ki-tae and Lee Wan

== Original soundtrack ==
=== Part 1 ===
Released on March 09, 2023
No.	Title	Lyrics	Music	Artist	Length
1.	"Because of You"	Lee Yong-min (Urbane Music)	Lee Yong-min (Urbane Music); Choi Jae-hyeok (Urbane Music)	Cheero	3:52

=== Part 2 ===
Released on March 16, 2023
No.	Title	Lyrics	Music	Artist	Length
1.	"Romance"	Undefeated W	Undefeated W; Lee Joo-yong	The Bridge	3:57

=== Part 3 ===
Released on March 23, 2023
No.	Title	Lyrics	Music	Artist	Length
1.	"Couldn't Say"	Lee Yong-min (Urbane Music)	Lee Yong-min (Urbane Music); Choi Jae-hyeok (Urbane Music)	JNB	3:56

=== Part 4 ===
Released on March 30, 2023
No.	Title	Lyrics	Music	Artist	Length
1.	"If I spend countless nights"	Undefeated W; Ahn Sol-hee	Undefeated W; Ahn Sol-hee; Jimin (JAK); Gunchi	Rumy	3:59

== Episodes ==
No.	English title	Original release date
1	"Would you like to start the game?"	March 9, 2023
2	"Timing"	March 9, 2023
3	"Your social media"	March 16, 2023
4	"A flying ball and sudden confession"	March 16, 2023
5	"The distance between us"	March 23, 2023
6	"Promise to never be apart"	March 23, 2023
7	"Crossroads of choice"	March 30, 2023
8	"The ending of the game"	March 30, 2023

== Accolades ==
Name of the award ceremony, year presented, category, nominee of the award, and the result of the nomination
Award ceremony	Year	Category	Nominee / Work	Result	Ref.
GagaOOLala Awards	2023	Best BL Series (Korea)	Our Dating Sim	Won	
HUB Awards	2023	Highlight of the Year - Korea	Our Dating Sim	Won	

=== Listicles ===
Year-end lists for Our Dating Sim
Critic/Publication	List	Rank	Ref.
Teen Vogue	13 Best BL Dramas of 2023	Placed	
