= Plus and Minus (TV series) =

- 正負之間
- Genre: Boys' love, Drama, Romance
- Directed by: Chiang Ping Chen
- Country of origin: Taiwan
- Original language: Mandarin
- No. of seasons: 1
- No. of episodes: 12

Production
- Running time: 25 minutes
- Production companies: CATCHPLAY, Taiwan Creative Content Agency, Rakuten Japan, SPO, Video Market

Original release
- Network: GagaOOLala, Viki
- Release: April 15 – June 24, 2022

Plus and Minus (Chinese: 正負之間) is a Taiwanese television series released in 2022, produced by CATCHPLAY in collaboration with the Taiwan Creative Content Agency, Rakuten Japan, SPO, and Video Market. Directed by Chiang Ping Chen, the main cast includes Shih Cheng Hao, Max Lin, Matt Lee, and Zheng Qi Lei.

== Synopsis ==
Fu Li Gong and Zheng Ze Shou have been close friends since childhood, sharing their school years and later working together at the same law firm. What began as a long-standing friendship gradually develops into deeper feelings, challenging them to move from companions to lovers. In parallel, the story follows X, a nocturnal bartender, and Jian, who runs a daytime laundry business. Despite their opposite lifestyles, their encounter sparks an unexpected connection, exploring contrasts between day and night and the attraction of opposing worlds.

== Cast ==
=== Main ===
- Max Lin as Cheng Tse Shou
- Shih Cheng Hao as Fu Li Kung
- Zheng Qi Lei as Kato Yuki
- Matt Lee as Jian Ying Ze

=== Supporting ===
- Shara Lin as Nikita
- Amy as Amy
- Michael Lin as Fu Hsing Wang
- Flora Gu as Cheng Xue Ching
- Bryant Li as Cheng Wei Chieh
- Boris Wang as Qian Zhong Hou

=== Guest ===
- Arlena Chang as Woman on blind date (Ep. 1)
- Aaron Lai as Xiao Dong (Ep. 5–7)
- Hank Wang as A Han (Ep. 5–7)
- Lance Chiu as Policeman (Ep. 5)
- Akihiro Kawai as Policeman (Ep. 5)
- Yue Wang as Ms. Wang (Ep. 8–9, 11)
- Shao Qing Song as Mr. Song (Ep. 9, 11)
- Charles Tu as Wedding Photographer (Ep. 12)
- Huang Juan Zhi as Zi (Ep. 12)
- Wayne Song as En (Ep. 12)
- Lin Shuai Fu as Television celebrity
- Scott Yang as Lovelorn apprentice
- Zheng Yu En as Xiao Yu

== Production ==
The series was announced in 2022 as part of Taiwan's expansion of BL content, supported by local and international companies.

== Broadcast ==
Plus and Minus premiered on April 15, 2022, and concluded on June 24, 2022, with 12 episodes of approximately 25 minutes each. Episodes were released weekly on Fridays.

== Reception ==
Plus and Minus received attention from critics and audiences. Suco de Manga highlighted the balance between romance and legal drama, noting the gradual development of the protagonists’ relationship. Apple Daily Taiwan described the project as part of the growing popularity of BL dramas in the country, while SETN reported on the positive reception among younger audiences.

On rating platforms, the series scored 7.6/10 from over 16,000 votes on MyDramaList, and 9.3/10 from more than 21,000 reviews on Viki.
