= Contrast (TV series) =

2026 Japanese Boys' Love television series

- コントラスト
- Genre: Drama; Romance; Boys' Love
- Based on: Contrast (manga)
- Written by: Yamada Kana
- Directed by: Tomita Miki
- Starring: Iuchi Haruhi; Akune Haruse
- Country of origin: Japan
- Original language: Japanese
- No. of seasons: 1
- No. of episodes: 8

Production
- Running time: 25 minutes
- Production company: FOD

Original release
- Network: FOD
- Release: 13 March 2026

Contrast (Japanese: コントラスト) is a Japanese romantic drama television series with a Boys' Love (BL) theme, based on the manga of the same name. Produced by FOD, the series premiered in March 2026 and consists of eight episodes of approximately 25 minutes each. It was also released internationally on GagaOOLala.

== Synopsis ==
Kanata Aoyama is a popular but emotionally distant student, while Akira Senkawa is quiet and academically focused. Despite their contrasting personalities, the two begin to bond through encounters on the school rooftop. Their relationship gradually develops into a youthful romance that explores the challenges of growing up.

== Cast ==
=== Main ===
- Iuchi Haruhi as Kanata Aoyama
- Akune Haruse as Akira Senkawa

=== Supporting ===
- Tomisato Nao as Nakano Mizuki (Kanata's friend)
- HAYATO as Jun (Kanata's friend)
- Kashimata Ryunosuke as Makki (Kanata's classmate)
- Yoneo Kento as Akira's best friend from cram school
- Nakayama Shoki as Senkawa Hikaru (Akira's older brother)
- Inoue Sora as Kanda Yoichi (Akira's former tutor)
- Okura Ruhito as Aoyama Yuito (Kanata's younger brother)
- Nakayama Hinano as Yurika (Mizuki's friend)

== Production ==
The live-action adaptation of the manga Contrast was announced in January 2026 by FOD. Directed by Tomita Miki with a screenplay by Yamada Kana, the project was highlighted by Black Company and ADTV as part of the growing trend of BL adaptations in Japan.

== Broadcast ==
Contrast premiered on 13 March 2026, with weekly episodes released on Fridays via FOD. The series was also licensed for international distribution by GagaOOLala.

== Reception ==
MyNavi praised the chemistry between the lead actors and the adaptation's faithfulness to the original manga, while TV Guide emphasized the show's resonance with younger audiences and its portrayal of adolescence. Yahoo News Japan also reported on the premiere, noting the popularity of the source manga and the anticipation surrounding the adaptation.
