= Feel What You Feel =

2026 Chinese television series

- 你的心事映在我的眉間
- Genre: Drama; Boys' love Romance
- Based on: Love and Punishment by Weiming Lake (未名湖畔的爱与罚) by Nilü Zhuren
- Written by: Nilü Zhuren (original author)
- Directed by: Zhang Wanshi (章晚時)
- Starring: Sun Caizhen (孙才桢); Liang Beiyi (梁贝易); Huang Huaiting (黄怀霆); Cheng Hao (程昊)
- Country of origin: China
- Original language: Mandarin
- No. of seasons: 1
- No. of episodes: 8

Production
- Running time: 40 minutes

Original release
- Network: GagaOOLala; Rakuten Viki
- Release: April 3, 2026 – present

Feel What You Feel (Chinese: 你的心事映在我的眉间) is a 2026 Chinese boys' love television series directed by Zhang Wanshi and starring Sun Caizhen and Liang Beiyi.

Based on the novel Love and Punishment by Weiming Lake (未名湖畔的爱与罚) by Nilü Zhuren, the series premiered on 3 April 2026 on GagaOOLala and Rakuten Viki.

== Plot ==
Set in the early 2000s, the series follows university students Yu Lei and Chen Ke, whose friendship begins to change after an impromptu football match on a rainy night. As they grow closer, both struggle with unspoken feelings while navigating youth, friendship and first love.

== Cast ==
=== Main ===
- Sun Caizhen (孙才桢) as Yu Lei (于雷)
- Liang Beiyi (梁贝易) as Chen Ke (陈可)
- Huang Huaiting (黄怀霆) as Li Ming (李明)
- Cheng Hao (程昊) as Ouyang Han (欧阳翰)

=== Supporting ===
- Zhou Qianxiao (周千晓) as Zhang Han (张涵)

== Production ==
The series was directed by Zhang Wanshi, who had previously directed Hi, My X Man. It is based on the danmei novel Love and Punishment by Weiming Lake by Nilü Zhuren, who also participated in the screenplay adaptation. To recreate the setting of the early 2000s, the production team sourced period furniture, sports uniforms and university locations intended to reflect campus life of the era. According to director Zhang Wanshi, rain serves as a recurring visual motif throughout the series, reflecting the characters' emotional development and memories of youth.

== Reception ==
Following its release, Taiwanese media highlighted the series' recreation of early-2000s university life and its adaptation of a well-known danmei novel. Several publications also commented on the performances of Sun Caizhen and Liang Beiyi and on the series' visual style. On Rakuten Viki, the series holds a user rating of 9.1 out of 10 based on more than 6,100 user ratings.
