= Rearrange (TV series) =

2025 Thai television series

- Thai: ขอฟังอีกครั้งเพลงรักของเธอ
- Literally: Rearrange
- Genre: Romantic drama; Boys' love (BL)
- Written by: Title Nirattisai Ratphithak; Kamolchanok Nipakanont
- Directed by: Big Napat Tangsanga
- Starring: Flute Chinnapat Kittichaiwarangkul; Marc Thanat Rattanasiriphan; Bom Panupong Janchai; Austin Kijchunhakan Hongsombud
- Composer: Teeraphong Prathumrat
- Country of origin: Thailand
- Original language: Thai
- No. of episodes: 10

Production
- Executive producers: Flute Chinnapat Kittichaiwarangkul; Mook Worranit Thawornwong
- Cinematography: Sun Rungsi Sarnkingthong
- Running time: 50 minutes
- Production company: FRT Entertainment

Original release
- Network: Channel 3 HD
- Release: 11 August – 13 October 2025

Rearrange (Thai: ขอฟังอีกครั้งเพลงรักของเธอ) is a 2025 Thai television series in the romantic drama and boys' love (BL) genres, directed by Big Napat Tangsanga and produced by FRT Entertainment. The series aired from 11 August to 13 October 2025, with weekly episodes on Mondays on Channel 3 HD. An uncut version was also made available on the TrueVisions NOW app. The series was also released on GagaOOLala and YouTube.

The series stars Flute Chinnapat Kittichaiwarangkul and Marc Thanat Rattanasiriphan in the lead roles. The soundtrack was composed by Teeraphong Prathumrat and the cinematography was handled by Sun Rungsi Sarnkingthong.

== Synopsis ==
Win (Flute Chinnapat) is a 44-year-old man who, after losing his best friend Nut (Marc Thanat) and the musical dream they shared, leads a purposeless life. One day, he is given the opportunity to go back in time to the age of 17. Determined to change their fate, he decides to reform the rock band they had created and lead the group to victory in the "Star of Band" competition.

The more Win tries to alter the past, the closer the clock ticks to Nut's death. However, he grows closer to his friend and allows himself to feel the love he has kept hidden for 20 years. The series questions the price of trying to change the past and whether some things are meant to happen.

== Cast ==
=== Main ===
- Flute Chinnapat Kittichaiwarangkul (Flute) as Win (Saranphop Thanasobmut)
- Marc Thanat Rattanasiriphan (Marc) as Nut (Nutthanan Sriwanit)

=== Supporting ===
- Bom Panupong Janchai (Bom) as Chai
- Austin Kijchunhakan Hongsombud (Austin) as Ek
- Opal Kulwipa Ngamsukkasemsri (Opal) as Biu
- Mint Benjanee Watcharavasoontara (Mint) as Lin
- David Asavanond as Withun (Win's father)
- Songsit Roongnophakunsri (Kob) as Nut's father
- Chatchawit Techarukpong (Victor) as Pipob
- Thana Chatborirak (Nong ) as older Win
- Apple Lapisara Intarasut as older Lin

=== Guest ===
- Worranit Thawornwong (Mook) as "Star of Band" staff member (Ep. 9)

== Production ==
The series was produced by FRT Entertainment. The project was presented at the "FRT LINE UP 2025" event in November 2024. In addition to the series, the project also includes the release of over 10 songs and the debut of a boy band after the series ended, with the band Three Man Down participating in the music production.

A special screening of the first episode, titled "Rearrange 1st EP Exclusive Premiere: The Way Back to Our Dream", was held on 11 August 2025 at SF World Cinema in CentralWorld, Bangkok, with the cast and crew in attendance.

== Release ==
The series premiered on Channel 3 HD on 11 August 2025, airing every Monday at 10:30 p.m. (local time). The uncut version was simultaneously made available at 11:00 p.m. on the TrueVisions NOW app. The series is also available on streaming platforms GagaOOLala and YouTube.

The tenth and final episode aired on 13 October 2025.
