= Fight For You (TV Series) =

2025 Taiwanese Boys' Love television series

- 對立而已
- Genre: Romantic drama; Boys' Love; Action
- Written by: Cai Fei Qiao
- Directed by: Cai Fei Qiao
- Starring: Andy Ko; Nelson
- Country of origin: Taiwan
- Original language: Mandarin
- No. of seasons: 1
- No. of episodes: 12

Production
- Running time: 24 minutes
- Production company: VBL Series

Original release
- Network: iQIYI; GagaOOLala
- Release: 28 March – 6 June 2025

Fight for You (Chinese: 對立而已) is a 2025 Taiwanese Boys' Love television series produced by VBL Series. It stars Andy Ko and Nelson in the lead roles and premiered on March 28, 2025, airing weekly on Fridays until June 6, 2025. The series is available for streaming on iQIYI and GagaOOLala.

== Synopsis ==
Da Hei, a young man struggling to cover his grandmother’s medical expenses, joins a shadowy organization known for taking on any kind of job, from locating lost pets to carrying out morally dubious tasks. Assigned a new roommate named Xiao Bai, Da Hei is unaware that Bai is actually an undercover agent tasked with dismantling the group from within. As they navigate increasingly dangerous missions, the two form a close bond that begins to blur the lines between duty and emotion. But when Xiao Bai’s true identity is revealed, their connection is put to the ultimate test.

== Cast ==
=== Main ===
- Andy Ko as Hei Yu Bo / "Da Hei"
- Nelson as Bai Zhou Qi / "Xiao Bai"

=== Supporting ===
- Mike Lin as Bai Zhou Guo / "Da Bai"
- Matthew Han as Bu Xing / "No Sir"
- Xia He Xi as Dou Ke Yi
- Justin Chang as Shi Di Fen / "Steven"
- Mimi Shao as Hei Jia Li (Da Hei's younger sister)
- Xiu Jun Lin as Hei Shi Lin (Da Hei's grandmother)
- Kenny Chen as A O
- Ku Chi Ying as "Old K"
- Cheng Tiao Chin as Intelligence Department colleague

=== Guest ===
- Kevin Chang as Heng Si / "Ever 4" (Ep. 1)
- Chen Chvn Ting as Luo Bu Shi (Ep. 1)
- Liang Ching Ming as food stall customer (Ep. 1)
- Chen Po Che as food stall customer (Ep. 1)
- Chiang Chiu Hung as Cai Fu Kai (Ep. 9)
- Tom Zhang as gangster boss (Ep. 9)
- Chao Hsi as armed man (Ep. 9)
- Tseng Yu Jung as bartender (Ep. 12)

== Reception ==
Fight for You received mixed to positive reviews. On MyDramaList, it holds a rating of 7.7 out of 10 based on 2,898 user ratings. On IMDb, the series has a score of 7.0 based on 147 users.

Critics praised the chemistry between the leads and the show's blend of suspense and romance. The BL Xpress highlighted the series’ emotional depth and character development. Taiwanese outlet Yahoo News noted the series’ popularity among younger audiences and its unique take on espionage themes. Owlting News also covered the series’ fan engagement and behind-the-scenes interviews.
