= Twins (Thai TV series) =

Thai boys' love sports drama television series

- สลับรัก นักลูกยาง
- Genre: Boys' love; Sports drama; Romance
- Starring: Frame Ritchanon Sriprasitdacha; Ryan Panya McShane; Mimi Ruethaiphat Phatthananapaphangkorn; Pooh Phiangphor
- Country of origin: Thailand
- Original language: Thai
- No. of seasons: 1
- No. of episodes: 12

Production
- Producer: Teerapat Puangsiri
- Running time: 49 minutes
- Production company: Love Media Thailand

Original release
- Network: Channel 3 HD
- Release: 3 November 2023 – 19 January 2024

Twins (Thai: สลับรัก นักลูกยาง) is a Thai boys' love sports drama television series produced by Love Media Thailand and directed by Pro Siwasit Phondongnok and Ball Kanathorn Tabvilai. The series stars Frame Ritchanon Sriprasitdacha in a dual role as twin brothers Sprite and Zee, alongside Ryan Panya McShane.

The series aired on Channel 3 HD from 3 November 2023 to 19 January 2024 and was made available internationally through GagaOOLala.

== Synopsis ==
Sprite and Zee are identical twins raised apart after their parents divorce. Zee becomes a volleyball player, while Sprite trains in jiu-jitsu.

After Zee gets hurt in an attack meant for Sprite, he can't play in a tournament that could get him on the national team. Sprite feels guilty and agrees to pretend to be Zee on the university volleyball team. There he gets close to Zee's teammates and friends, including First, a player who often fought with Zee. As Sprite deals with sports, friendship, and romance, he starts to question his own dreams.

== Cast and characters ==
=== Main ===
- Ritchanon Sriprasitdacha (Frame) as Sprite / Zee
- Panya McShane (Ryan) as First

=== Supporting ===
- Ruethaiphat Phatthananapaphangkorn (Mimi) as Salmon
- Phiangphor (Pooh) as Thun
- Tatchanon Thongpao (Team) as Sam
- Thotsawat Sing-uppo (Tuss) as Jack
- Apivit Ueamahasopa (Ten) as Mike
- Chindanai Dechawaleekul (Hearth) as Tom
- Traipat Wuthibowornnant (Nut) as Deddeaw
- Kooppong Chumnanyong (Kong) as Ko
- Warawut Saengsriruang (Plub) as Tong
- Napatt Utsaha (Ohm) as Boy
- Tirawat Hmokchai (Tan) as At
- Phuliwat Yananruenon (Chan) as Phu
- Hovic Tarakjian (Matthew) as Max
- Pasawit Savetrittikun (Ohm) as JJ
- Phatthara Cheaujamporn (Fluke) as Tono
- Watsanakorn Tanbin as Ong
- Alicha Sripratak (Thongfah) as Namkhing
- Phuntipa Pongruangrong (Truly) as Medploy
- Nattawadee Pipobpornchai (Arhoung) as May
- Sadanan Thipchan (Mew) as Mina
- Nantawat Palakawongsna Ayudhya (Earth) as Danai
- Amata Piyavanich (Jum) as Rin
- Adisorn Athagrisna (Tao) as Coach Wit

== Production ==
Love Media Thailand produced the series as a sports-oriented boys' love drama that combines volleyball and jiu-jitsu. Producer Wisut Walla said the project aimed to promote sports among young audiences while adding romantic and coming-of-age themes. The production held a blessing ceremony on 27 July 2023 at Union Mall in Bangkok. Producers, cast members, and representatives from the Jiu-Jitsu Association of Thailand attended.

The team released promotional fitting photos in August 2023 before the series premiere. Several cast members trained extensively for their roles. Frame Ritchanon trained in jiu-jitsu for nearly a year before filming. Ryan Panya practiced volleyball techniques to play a competitive athlete.

== Release ==
Twins premiered on Channel 3 HD on 3 November 2023 and aired weekly on Fridays at 22:45 ICT. Before the TV debut, the cast and crew held a special screening of the first episode at Century Movie Plaza in Bangkok. GagaOOLala distributed the series internationally, and 3Plus streamed in Thailand.

== Reception ==
Thai media praised the series for mixing boys' love storytelling with competitive sports, especially volleyball and jiu-jitsu. After the premiere, local media reported positive audience reactions and strong fan support at events and screenings. The production said episodes from December 2023 had a television rating of 1.0. Episode four drew about 200,100 viewers, and episode five slightly more. The series also gained viewers outside Thailand, including audiences in Brazil, Indonesia, the Philippines, India, Malaysia, Colombia, Mexico, Russia, Vietnam, Laos, and the United States.

== Awards and nominations ==
Year	Award	Category	Recipient	Result
2023	Thai Television Identity of Siam Awards	Best Sports Promotion BL Series	Twins	Won
2023	Thai Television Identity of Siam Awards	Outstanding New BL Actor	Frame Ritchanon Sriprasitdacha; Ryan Panya McShane	Won
2023	Thai Television Identity of Siam Awards	Best BL Couple	Pooh Phiangphor; Team Tatchanon Thongpao	Won
