= Unexpectedly Naughty Fukami =

Japanese manga

- Cover of vol. 1 of the Japanese version

やたらやらしい深見くん (Yatara Yarashii Fukami-kun)
- Genre: Boys' love, romantic comedy
- Manga
- Written by: Ayaka Matsumoto
- Published by: Suiseisha
- English publisher: Coolmic (digital); Seven Seas Entertainment (print)
- Imprint: Glanz BL Comics
- Magazine: ComicFesta
- Original run: December 7, 2022 – present
- Volumes: 5
- Anime television series
- Directed by: Akane Ozora
- Written by: Ēyo Kurosaki
- Music by: Akinori Shiba; Crocodile
- Studio: Studio Hōkiboshi
- Licensed by: Ascendent Animation
- Original network: AnimeFesta (premium version); Tokyo MX, BS11 (standard version)
- Original run: March 14, 2025 – June 9, 2025
- Episodes: 8
- Television drama
- Directed by: Eriko Shirai
- Produced by: Kazuhiro Itō
- Written by: Nao Shioji
- Original network: Tokyo MX
- Original run: April 7, 2026 – June 9, 2026
- Episodes: 10
- icon

Unexpectedly Naughty Fukami (Japanese: やたらやらしい深見くん, Hepburn: Yatara Yarashii Fukami-kun) is a Japanese boys' love manga by Ayaka Matsumoto. It is serialized digitally on the website ComicFesta since December 7, 2022. An anime adaptation was broadcast from March 14, 2025, to June 9, 2025, with a premium version for online streaming and a standard version for television broadcast. A live-action drama adaptation was broadcast on Tokyo MX from April 7 to June 9, 2026.

== Plot ==
Akihiro Kaji, a popular "ace" from the sales department at his company, is seen as admirable by his co-workers. However, he is secretly a narcissistic playboy who looks down on others, giving them scores based on their attractiveness. One day, Kaji is paired with Yu Fukami on a business trip. Despite Kaji finding him sloppy and dishevelled at first, he becomes drawn to him after discovering he is sexually attractive.

== Characters ==
Akihiro Kaji (梶 彰弘, Kaji Akihiro)
Voiced by: Chasuke
Kaji is the "ace" of the sales department. Despite being a narcissistic playboy, he is considered attractive and respected at his company. Despite this, Matsumoto describes him as a "coward in reality" who feels "lonely" inside.
Yu Fukami (深見 悠, Fukami Yū)
Voiced by: Marshmallow Yakitaro
Fukami is a sloppy-looking man from the IT department. However, Kaji realizes he is attractive without his glasses. Fukami lost his parents at a young age and had taken care of his sister and nephew. As a result, he finds it difficult to rely on others for help.

== Media ==
=== Manga ===
Unexpectedly Naughty Fukami is written and illustrated by Ayaka Matsumoto. It is serialized on the website ComicFesta under the Screamo label since December 7, 2022. The chapters were later released in five bound volumes by Suiseisha under the Glanz BL Comics imprint. The manga is serialized in English by Coolmic in webtoon format.

On December 26, 2023, Renta! announced they were releasing the manga digitally in English, with the first volume made available on their website on January 3, 2024. On November 5, 2025, Seven Seas Entertainment announced that they would be releasing the series in print.

In an interview with Chil Chil, Matsumoto stated that although she felt the premise of Unexpected Naughty Fukami was cliché and conventional, the editorial department had suggested it as an idea when she had shared with them that she enjoyed cliché and conventional stories. While drawing the manga, she paid attention to the timing and expressions so that the story would be easy to read. The bed scene in the first episode was the first time Matsumoto had drawn a "love scene." For volume 2, Matsumoto considered having Kaji and Fukami become a couple early on in the story, but she changed some parts because she thought "it would take more time and effort [for Kaji] to become closer to Fukami."

No.	Original release date	Original ISBN	English release date	English ISBN
1	January 18, 2024	9784434328015	January 3, 2024 (Renta!); September 29, 2026 (Seven Seas)	979-8-89863-267-0
2	July 18, 2024	9784434338021	—	—
3	March 18, 2025	9784434350641 (regular edition); 9784434352614 (limited edition with booklet)	—	—
4	January 16, 2026	9784434366826	—	—
5	November 18, 2026	9784434383687	—	—

=== Anime ===
On May 21, 2024, AnimeFesta announced they were producing an anime adaptation of Unexpectedly Naughty Fukami. The anime adaptation is animated by Studio Hōkiboshi. Two versions of the anime were produced: a standard version for television broadcast and a premium version including sexual content for streaming on OceanVeil under the Toridori label. The premium version premiered on March 14, 2025, and also included an uncensored version. The standard version was broadcast on Tokyo MX. (Note: Tokyo MX lists the premiere date as April 6, 2025, at 25:00, which is April 7, 2025, at 1:00 a.m.) An additional broadcast includes BS 11.

The anime adaptation is directed by Akane Ozora, with Ēyo Kurosaki as writer. Reina Nasu is in charge of character design and animation direction. Akinori Shiba is in charge of sound direction, with Crocodile producing the soundtrack. The theme song is "Bokura no Rendezvous" by Chasuke and Marshmallow Yakitaro as their characters.

On March 22, 2025, OceanVeil announced that an English-language dub produced by Ascendent Animation would be released on April 6, 2025.

==== Episodes ====
No.	Title	Directed by	Written by	Original release date
1	"A Man Who is a Perfect Match for Me"; Transliteration: "Kanpeki na Ore-sama ni Tsuriau Otoko" (Japanese: 完璧な俺様に釣り合う男)	Unknown	Unknown	March 14, 2025 (online streaming); April 7, 2025 (television broadcast)
2	"What's Your Game, Zero?!"; Transliteration: "Nan no Tsumori da Rei-ten Otoko!" (Japanese: なんのつもりだ0点男！)	Unknown	Unknown	April 14, 2025
3	"Fukami and... a Girl?!"; Transliteration: "Fukami to... Onna!?" (Japanese: 深見と。。。女!?)	Unknown	Unknown	April 21, 2025
4	"Say My Name"; Transliteration: "Namae o Yondemite Hoshii" (Japanese: 名前を呼んでみてほしい)	Unknown	Unknown	May 5, 2025
5	"I Won't Go Easy on You"; Transliteration: "Yasashiku Nanka Sun Janē yo" (Japanese: 優しくなんかすんじゃねえよ)	Unknown	Unknown	May 12, 2025
6	"Sorry... I've Got a Cold"; Transliteration: "Warui kedo... Kaze Moratte" (Japanese: 悪いけど。。。風邪もらって)	Unknown	Unknown	May 19, 2025
7	"I Couldn't Help But Be Attracted"; Transliteration: "Dōshiyō mo Naku Hikareteta" (Japanese: どうしようもなく惹かれてた)	Unknown	Unknown	June 2, 2025
8	"Is It So Bad If I Fall in Love?"; Transliteration: "Suki ni Nattara Dame na no ka?" (Japanese: 好きになったらだめなのか？)	Unknown	Unknown	June 9, 2025

=== TV drama ===
A live-action television drama adaptation of Unexpectedly Naughty Fukami was announced on February 27, 2026. It was broadcast on Tokyo MX from April 7 to June 9, 2026. (Note: Tokyo MX lists the broadcast date as April 6, 2026, at 25:00, which is April 7, 2026, at 1:00 a.m.) It will also be streamed on DMM TV and TVer. GagaOOLala acquired the streaming rights for the series outside of Japan.

The drama is directed by Eriko Shirai and produced by Kazuhiro Itō, with Nao Shioji in charge of the script. The series stars Atsuki Kashio as Kaji and Yu Miyazaki as Fukami.
