= Jazz for Two =

2024 South Korean television series

- Promotional poster
- Hangul: 재즈처럼
- RR: Jaejeucheoreom
- MR: Chaejŭch'ŏrŏm
- Genre: BL; Musical drama; Drama; Romantic comedy
- Based on: Jazz for Two by Keul Ra-jyu
- Directed by: Song Soo-rim; Kang Hye-rim
- Starring: Ji Ho-geun; Kim Jin-kwon; Song Han-gyeom; Kim Jung-ha
- Country of origin: South Korea
- Original language: Korean
- No. of episodes: 8

Production
- Production companies: IPQ; MODT Studio

Original release
- Network: Cinema Heaven
- Release: March 26 – March 29, 2024

Jazz for Two (Korean: 재즈처럼) is a 2024 South Korean television series based on the BL web novel of the same name by Keul Ra-jyu, starring Ji Ho-geun, Kim Jin-kwon, Song Han-gyeom and Kim Jung-ha. It aired on Cinema Heaven from March 26–29, 2024, at 13:00 (KST). It is also available for streaming every Wednesday through 10 global OTT services, including Wavve, Watcha, TVING, Naver N Store, Genie TV, BTV, U+TV, FOD, GagaOOLala, and iQIYI.

== Cast and characters ==
=== Main ===
- Ji Ho-geun as Han Tae-yi
- Kim Jin-kwon as Yoon Seo-heon
- Song Han-gyeom as Seo Do-yoon
- Kim Jung-ha as Song Ju-ha

=== Supporting ===
- Byeon Seong-tae as Han Tae-joon
- Ko Jae-hyun as Se-jun
- Kim Min-ah as Song Ju Hui

=== Special appearances ===
- Kim Jae-han as Lee Da-yeol (Ep. 1)
- Shin Ye-chan as Jo Tae-hyun (Ep. 1)
