= The Bangkok Boy =

2025 Thai television series

- บางกอกบอย
- Genre: Drama; Crime; Romantic drama; Boys' love
- Directed by: Chankacha Prathuan
- Starring: Tape Worrachai Sirikongsuwan; Cho Si Hyeon; Choi Seung Ho; Paythai Ploymeeka; Jaja Jinjutha Siripheng; Phoom Praphoom Vasuratna
- Country of origin: Thailand
- Original language: Thai
- No. of seasons: 1
- No. of episodes: 12

Production
- Production locations: Bangkok, Thailand
- Running time: 45 minutes
- Production company: Munwork Mediafilm

Original release
- Network: Channel 7; WeTV; GagaOOLala
- Release: 26 April – 12 July 2025

The Bangkok Boy (Thai: บางกอกบอย) is a 2025 Thai drama and boys' love television series that aired from 26 April to 12 July 2025 on Channel 7. The series follows Sun, a former inmate who forms a secret gang in Bangkok while seeking revenge and truth. It is available for streaming on WeTV and GagaOOLala.

== Synopsis ==
After serving time in prison, Sun returns to Bangkok seeking vengeance. He establishes an underground gang known as the Bangkok Boys, aiming to uncover the truth behind the deaths of his loved ones. As his influence grows, Sun becomes entangled with Peace, a Korean artist, leading to a complex relationship where love and hatred collide.

== Cast ==
=== Main ===
- Worrachai Sirikongsuwan (Tape) as Sun
- Cho Si Hyeon as Peace / Cho Song Min

=== Supporting ===
- Choi Seung Ho as Jun Ho
- Paythai Ploymeeka as Tan
- Jinjutha Siripheng (Jaja) as Mei
- Phoom Praphoom Vasuratna (Phoom) as Tim
- Akadech Jaroonsot (Aon) as Aim
- Phee Phiangphor as Ji Hun
- Piyawat Phongkanittanon (Top) as Kawin
- Thanakorn Techawicha (Aton) as Tien
- Phanthipha Phongrueangrong (Truly) as Cherries
- Dome Petchtamrongchai as Nap
- Hwang Jun Su as Seong Hun
- Passin Reungwoot (A) as Songphum

=== Guest ===
- Peeratad Promted (Ball) as Kong

== Production ==
The series was produced by Munwork Mediafilm, a Thai production company. It is a Thai-Korean co-production.The series received coverage from Taiwanese media outlets, which highlighted its action scenes and the chemistry between the leads.

== Broadcast ==
The series consists of 12 episodes, each approximately 45 minutes long. It aired weekly on Saturdays on Channel 7 from 26 April to 12 July 2025.
