= Ash (TV series) =

2026 Hong Kong television series

- Official poster
- Traditional Chinese: 煙灰
- Literal meaning: Cigarette ash
- IPA: [jin˥ fuj˥]
- Jyutping: jin1 fui1
- Genre: Boys' love; Romantic drama; Action
- Based on: 煙灰 by Feng Nong
- Starring: Yi Xuan; Leo Peng; Sing Lee; Pat Ha; Ethan Ku; Jonathan Hau; Hugo Wong
- Country of origin: Hong Kong
- Original language: Cantonese
- No. of episodes: 9

Production
- Running time: 40–51 minutes

Original release
- Network: Youku
- Release: 14 August – 2 October 2026

Ash (Chinese: 煙灰) is a 2026 Hong Kong boys' love romantic drama television series, starring Yi Xuan (Kingston), Leo Peng and Sing Lee. Produced by Tongmeng International and based on the novel of the same name by Chinese writer Feng Nong. It premiered on Youku on 14 August 2026 and is presented as a Hong Kong BL production filmed entirely in Cantonese.

== Plot ==
The series follows Mok Fei Foon, an undercover police officer, and Hui Leuk To, the leader of a business group connected to Hong Kong's criminal underworld. As the two men grow closer while concealing their true identities, their relationship is tested by mistrust and conflicts between rival criminal groups. Meanwhile, a counterfeiting operation places them in increasing danger.

== Cast ==
=== Main ===
- Yi Xuan (Kingston) as Mok Fei-foon
- Leo Peng as Hui Leuk-to (Vincent)
- Sing Lee as Siu Yan (Shawn)

=== Supporting ===
- Ethan Ku as Hui Luk-king
- Jonathan Hau as Tam Fung
- Hugo Wong as Lam Tung-sit (Joseph)
- Vanora Hui as Ho Tung-fong
- Angelina Chiu as So Ching-lin (Chloe)
- Pat Ha as Hui Wong Wan-ping
- Maverick Mak as Fung Sir
- Justin Cheung as Leung Yee
- Bryant Mak as Ho Lok
- Kenneth Cheung as Chan Wing-yan

== Production ==
Ash is an adaptation of the novel of the same name by Chinese writer Feng Nong. The series was produced entirely in Hong Kong, with Cantonese dialogue and a production team composed predominantly of local professionals. It was produced by Tongmeng International and distributed internationally through the international version of Youku.

The official trailer was released on 7 August 2026. The three leads, Kingston Yi, Leo Peng and Sing Lee, were promoted as the series' main cast.

The series premiered on 14 August 2026, with two episodes released on the first day. Subsequent episodes were released weekly on Fridays. The series consists of nine episodes, each approximately 30 minutes long.

Prior to the premiere, a screening event was held in Hong Kong with Kingston, Leo Peng, Sing Lee and other members of the cast in attendance.
