= Never Forget Your Enemy =

2026 South Korean Boys' Love television series

- 네 원수를 잊지 마라
- Genre: Drama; Romance; Boys' Love
- Starring: Lee Ja Woon; Hwang Jun Su
- Country of origin: South Korea
- Original language: Korean
- No. of seasons: 1
- No. of episodes: 8

Production
- Running time: 31 minutes
- Production company: WeTV

Original release
- Network: WeTV
- Release: 17 March – 1 April 2026

Never Forget Your Enemy (Korean: 네 원수를 잊지 마라) is a South Korean romantic drama television series with a Boys' Love (BL) theme, produced by WeTV. Starring Lee Ja Woon and Hwang Jun Su, it premiered on 17 March 2026 and is scheduled to conclude on 1 April 2026, with eight episodes of approximately 31 minutes each. It is considered the first original Korean BL series by WeTV.

== Synopsis ==
Ki Ha Neul and Yeo Sae Byeok were once school rivals but eventually became lovers. After an accident, Ha Neul loses the memory of the past ten years and believes they are still enemies. While struggling with the missing years of his life, Sae Byeok faces the dilemma of seeing his boyfriend treat him again as a rival. Between fragmented memories and conflicting emotions, both must decide whether love can overcome the forgotten past.

== Cast ==
=== Main ===
- Lee Ja Woon as Yeo Sae Byeok
- Hwang Jun Su as Ki Ha Neul

=== Supporting ===
- Oh Jae Hyeong as Yun Jeong Han
- Fila Lee as Ki Saet Byeol
- Sim So Yeon as Kim Yeong Suk (Ha Neul's mother)
- Park Eun Jo as Lee Se Ri

=== Guest ===
- Kohi as male student 1

== Production ==
The series was announced by WeTV in 2025 as part of its expansion into BL content. With eight episodes, it was officially released in March 2026. Thai Post and MGR Online highlighted the project as a major investment by the platform in the Korean market.

== Broadcast ==
Never Forget Your Enemy premiered on 17 March 2026 and is scheduled to conclude on 1 April 2026, with episodes released on Tuesdays and Wednesdays. The series was broadcast on WeTV and also made available on digital platforms such as Sanook.

== Reception ==
TrueID published a review highlighting the mix of romance and rivalry as central elements of the plot, while PPTV emphasized the cultural impact of the series as the first Korean BL produced by WeTV.

The Standard also reported on the production, noting the collaboration between the Thai and Korean entertainment industries in bringing the series to life.
