= At 25:00, in Akasaka =

Japanese manga series

- Cover of vol. 1 of the Japanese version

25時、赤坂で (Nijūgo-ji, Akasaka de)
- Genre: Boys' love, romance
- Manga
- Written by: Hiroko Natsuno
- Published by: Shodensha
- English publisher: NA: Seven Seas Entertainment
- Imprint: On BLUE Comics
- Magazine: Gōgai On BLUE (2017–2018); On BLUE (2018–present)
- Original run: November 25, 2017 – present
- Volumes: 5
- Television drama
- Directed by: Takahiro Horie (season 1); Ryo Kawasaki (season 1); Yuka Yasukawa (season 2); Shinju Funabiki (season 2); Takashi Haga (season 2)
- Produced by: Tomoshi Edogawa
- Written by: Miho Aotsuka; Kumiko Asō
- Licensed by: GagaOOLala
- Original network: TV Tokyo
- Original run: April 19, 2024 – December 4, 2025
- Episodes: 20
- icon

At 25:00, in Akasaka (Japanese: 25時、赤坂で, Hepburn: Nijūgo-ji, Akasaka de) (Note: Also spelled without a comma in Seven Seas' print releases. See also 30-hour clock in Japan.) is a Japanese manga series by Hiroko Natsuno. It was first serialized in the bimonthly boys' love manga magazine Gōgai On BLUE in November 2017. It was then moved to the main On BLUE magazine in April 2018.

A live-action television drama adaptation aired on TV Tokyo from April to June 2024, as part of their MokuDra 24 programming block. A second season aired from October to December 2025.

== Plot ==
Yuki Shirasaki, a rookie actor, gets his first lead role in the same-sex romance television drama Afternoon Dreams, starring opposite of Asami Hayama, a popular, handsome actor. Shirasaki also knows Hayama as an upperclassmen two years his senior from his university's film club. Throughout filming and getting to know Hayama on a deeper level, Shirasaki immerses himself deeper into his role and begins questioning his sexuality. In an effort to understand both his and his character's feelings, Shirasaki goes to a gay bar in Akasaka, Tokyo, to find a sexual partner; however, Hayama finds him at the bar and offers to become his sexual partner. As the two continue to spend time with each other both on and off set, Shirasaki realizes he has fallen in love with Hayama. Meanwhile, Hayama remains secretive about his own feelings and attraction towards Shirasaki, having been in love with him since they were in university.

== Characters ==
Yuki Shirasaki (白崎 由岐, Shirasaki Yuki)
Voiced by: Soma Saito (audio drama), Portrayed by: Taisuke Niihara (TV drama)
Shirasaki is a rookie actor. Natsuno described him as a "troublesome, yet honest junior who gives it his all", as well as being "insensitive".
Asami Hayama (羽山 麻水, Hayama Asami)
Voiced by: Takuya Satō (audio drama), Portrayed by: Kiita Komagine (TV drama)
Hayama is a popular, handsome actor. He is two years Shirasaki's senior and was in the same film club while he was a university school student. Natsuno described Hayama as "a little otherworldly".
Hajime Sakuma (佐久間 はじめ, Sakuma Hajime)
Voiced by: Shōhei Komatsu (audio drama), Portrayed by: Takuma Usa (TV drama)
Sakuma is a veteran actor. He is part of the supporting cast of Afternoon Dreams.
Kazuma Yamase (山瀬 一真, Yamase Kazuma)
Voiced by: Makoto Furukawa (audio drama), Portrayed by: Shōma Nagumo (TV drama)
Yamase is a new cast member of Afternoon Dreams, appearing in the show's film sequel as a love interest for Shirasaki's character. First appearing in volume 2, he becomes interested in Shirasaki and Hayama's relationship. He is from the same talent agency as Sakuma and is his junior. Natsuno described Yamase as someone who "goes at his own pace" and is "aggressive". She drew him while "thinking it'd be great" if Yamase became a "cute" character.
Nozomu Mihara (三原 望, Mihara Nozomu)
Voiced by: Jun Fukuyama (audio drama), Portrayed by: Yūshin Shinohara (TV drama)
Mihara is Hayama's friend from university and the owner of a gay bar.
Makita (牧田)
Voiced by: Reiou Tsuchida (audio drama), Portrayed by: Kenzō Fukutsu (TV drama)
Makita is the producer of Afternoon Dreams. In the television drama adaptation, he was given the full name Daisuke Makita (牧田 大輔).
Shinoda (篠田)
Voiced by: Genta Nakamura (audio drama), Portrayed by: Atsushi Hashimoto (TV drama)
Shinoda is Shirasaki's manager. In the television drama adaptation, he was given the full name Shōta Shinoda (篠田 翔太).
Akeno (明野)
Voiced by: Natsuki Aikawa (audio drama), Portrayed by: Moemi Katayama (TV drama)
Akeno is Hayama's manager. In the television drama adaptation, she was given the full name Kei Akeno (明野 圭).

== Media ==
=== Manga ===
At 25:00, in Akasaka is written and illustrated by Hiroko Natsuno. It was serialized in Gōgai On BLUE, a spin-off of the bimonthly boys' love manga magazine On BLUE, in the 2nd Season vol. 8 released on November 25, 2017. The series was later moved to the main On BLUE magazine beginning with vol. 34 released on April 25, 2018, where it was serialized beginning with the first chapter. The chapters were later released in five bound volumes by Shodensha under the On BLUE Comics imprint.

On July 13, 2019, Futekiya, a boys' love manga news website, announced that they had licensed At 25:00, in Akasaka for English language distribution through their manga subscription service as one of their launch titles. On March 6, 2024, Seven Seas Entertainment announced that they were licensing the series in English for North American distribution in print, where they released it under the title At 25:00 in Akasaka.

In 2018, Natsuno stated through an interview with Chil Chil that she enjoyed drawing Shirasaki's emotions as he is filming a drama, where it would be difficult to tell if he was acting or not. She also felt pressure in drawing the characters beautifully as they were celebrities. Due to depicting scripts from dramas, she also found it interesting choosing dialogue that "had a little [more] atmosphere" than how she normally drew manga. While working on the second volume, Natsuno came down with an undisclosed health condition, where she stated that it was the "first time she rode an ambulance" and that her condition was "nothing serious". For volume 3, Natsuno wanted to depict maintaining work and romance "pleasantly" and had fun writing dialogue for Mihara. For volume 5, Natsuno worked hard to depict Shirasaki and Hayama being apart and focusing on their jobs while still thinking of each other.

No.	Original release date	Original ISBN	English release date	English ISBN
1	November 24, 2018	9784396784652	July 13, 2019 (Futekiya); September 3, 2024 (Seven Seas)	9798891602144
2	February 25, 2020	9784396785017	January 10, 2021 (Futekiya); December 10, 2024 (Seven Seas)	9798891602151
3	May 25, 2021	9784396785246 (regular edition); ISBN 9784396785253 (limited edition with booklet)	March 11, 2025 (Seven Seas)	9798891602151
4	December 23, 2022	9784396785567 (regular edition); ISBN 9784396785574 (limited edition with booklet)	July 8, 2025 (Seven Seas)	9798891607569
5	June 24, 2024	9784396785864 (regular edition); ISBN 9784396785871 (limited edition with booklet)	November 4, 2025 (Seven Seas)	9798893735994

=== Audio drama ===
An audio drama adaptation produced by Fifth Avenue was released on CD. The first CD, adapting volume 1, was released on December 16, 2020. The second CD, adapting volume 2, was released on March 16, 2022. The third CD, adapting volume 3, was released on January 25, 2023. The fourth CD, adapting volume 4, was released on November 22, 2023. The fifth CD, adapting volume 5, was released on April 23, 2025.

=== Television drama ===
A live-action television drama adaptation of At 25:00, in Akasaka was announced on March 8, 2024. At the time of the announcement, Natsuno was in the process of finishing the fifth volume of the manga. The television drama adaptation was co-produced by TV Tokyo and GagaOOLala, and early in production, TV Tokyo sought GagaOOLala for opinions that would help make the series more accessible for a global audience. The series was broadcast from April 19 to June 21, 2024, (Note: TV Tokyo lists the broadcast date as April 18, 2024, at 00:30, which is April 19, 2024, at 12:30 a.m.) for 10 episodes on TV Tokyo as part of their MokuDra 24 programming block. Other broadcasts include TV Osaka, TV Aichi, TV Setouchi, TV Hokkaido, and TVQ Kyushu Broadcasting. The series is licensed by GagaOOLala for English-language distribution outside of Japan.

The series stars Taisuke Niihara as Shirasaki and Kiita Komagine as Hayama. Niihara and Komagine stated that they found it challenging to portray themselves as actors who "act within a show". The supporting cast includes Takuma Usa as Sakuma; Shōma Nagumo as Yamase, Atsushi Hashimoto as Shinoda; Moemi Katayama as Akeno; Yūshin Shinohara as Mihara; and Kenzō Fukutsu as Makita. Uchū Imagawa also appears in the drama as Asuka Kawada, an original character made for the drama adaptation.

The television drama adaptation is directed by Takahiro Horie and Ryo Kawasaki; it is written by Miho Aotsuka and Kumiko Asō. It is produced by Tomoshi Edogawa. Niihara stated that some scenes from the original manga were left out or changed through discussions with the producers and Natsuno. The opening theme is "Kakkaku" by Kujiragi. The ending theme is "Tokyo Night Lonely" by Mel.

A second season was announced on June 22, 2025, with the cast reprising their roles. Aotsuka and Asō returned to write the screenplays, while the new directors for the second season consist of Yuka Yasukawa, Shinju Funabiki, and Takashi Haga. The season aired from October 2 to December 4, 2025.

==== Season 1 (2024) ====
No.	Title	Directed by	Written by	Original release date
1	"Can't I Be Your Sex Partner?"; Transliteration: "Sekkusu no Aite, Ore ja Dame?" (Japanese: セックスの相手、俺じゃダメ?)	Takahiro Horie	Miho Aotsuka	April 19, 2024
2	"Let's Continue Kissing at Home... A Secret Contract Between the Two of Us"; Transliteration: "Kisu no Tsuzuki wa Ie de... Futari Dake no Himitsu no Keiyaku" (Japanese: キスの続きは家で...二人だけの秘密の契約)	Takahiro Horie	Miho Aotsuka	April 26, 2024
3	"A Secret Date at Home?! On the Double Bed, We..."; Transliteration: "Himitsu no O-ie Dēto!? Daburu Beddo de Futari wa..." (Japanese: 秘密のお家デート!?ダブルベッドで二人は...)	Ryo Kawasaki	Kumiko Asō	May 3, 2024
4	"These Special Feelings Are Just For the Drama... But Even So...?!"; Transliteration: "Kono Tokubetsu na Kimochi wa Dorama no Tame... Soretomo...!?" (Japanese: この特別な気持ちはドラマのため...それとも...!?)	Ryo Kawasaki	Kumiko Asō	May 10, 2024
5	"Overnight Stay at the Filming Location on the Hot Springs Street... A Forbidden Love Triangle Starts?!"; Transliteration: "Onsen Machi de no Tomari Roke... Kinshi no Sankaku Kankei Sutāto!?" (Japanese: 温泉街での泊まりロケ...禁断の三角関係スタート!?)	Ryo Kawasaki	Miho Aotsuka	May 17, 2024
6	"Someone I Can't Ever Forget"; Transliteration: "Zutto Wasurarenai Hito" (Japanese: ずっと忘れられない人)	Ryo Kawasaki	Miho Aotsuka	May 24, 2024
7	"The Most Beautiful Memory"; Transliteration: "Ichiban Kirei na Omoide" (Japanese: 一番きれいな思い出)	Takahiro Horie	Miho Aotsuka	May 31, 2024
8	"Our Starting Point"; Transliteration: "Boku-tachi no Genten" (Japanese: 僕たちの原点)	Takahiro Horie	Kumiko Asō	June 7, 2024
9	"I Want You to Sleep With Me"; Transliteration: "Ore to Nete Hoshiin Desu" (Japanese: 俺と寝てほしいんです)	Takahiro Horie	Miho Aotsuka	June 14, 2024
10	"Goodbye, Asami"; Transliteration: "Sayonara, Asami-san" (Japanese: さよなら、麻水さん)	Takahiro Horie	Miho Aotsuka	June 21, 2024

== Reception ==
At 25:00, in Akasaka won the Best Series category in the 2023 Chil Chil BL Awards. In the same year, the second CD won Best BLCD. In 2024, the series had sold over 1.2 million copies.

Anime News Network gave mixed reviews for the first volume, praising the art while criticizing the lack of focus on the characters.

The Television reviewed the television drama adaptation favorably, referring to the romantic moments as "exciting". The series reached no. 1 on GagaOOLala worldwide during its initial broadcast.
