= Secret Lover (TV series) =

2025 Taiwanese television series

- 秘密關係
- Genre: Romantic drama; Boys' Love
- Based on: Secret Lover by Shigu Komeoka
- Directed by: Chiang Ping Chen
- Starring: Wang Junhao; Cheng Hsiying; Lin Yentzu; Tzu Chuyuan; Lin Chiawei; Chang Kaiyi
- Country of origin: Taiwan
- Original language: Mandarin
- No. of seasons: 1

Production
- Producer: Brainwave Entertainment
- Running time: 40 minutes
- Production company: Brainwave Entertainment

Original release
- Network: GTV; GagaOOLala; iQIYI
- Release: 22 July 2025 – present

Secret Lover (Chinese: 秘密關係) is a 2025 Taiwanese boys' love television series produced by Brainwave Entertainment. It premiered on GTV and is distributed internationally via GagaOOLala and iQIYI. The series is based on the Japanese manga Secret Lover by Shigu Komeoka.

== Synopsis ==
Lu Junxi and Han Tuo have been close friends since childhood. During a college theater performance, Han Tuo confesses his feelings, and their bond begins to evolve into a romantic relationship. As they explore their connection through mock dates and playful intimacy, Junxi eventually reciprocates.

The couple keeps their relationship secret while facing external pressures: family disapproval, workplace harassment from Junxi's internship supervisor Vincent, and Han Tuo's father's insistence that he abandon his dream of becoming an architect to take over the family business. As graduation approaches, the duo must decide whether to reveal their relationship or part ways.

== Cast ==
- Wang Junhao as Lu Junxi
- Cheng Hsiying as Han Tuo
- Lin Yentzu as Lin Xiaoyang
- Tzu Chuyuan as He Youmei
- Lin Chiawei as Zhan Wensen
- Chang Kaiyi as Lu Yushu

== Reception ==
The series received positive commercial performance. Within three weeks of its premiere, the first episode's Chinese and English subtitle version accumulated over 1.8 million views on GTV's YouTube channel.

In December 2025, GagaOOLala released its year-end "Global BL Top 10" list, which ranked Secret Lover as the third most-viewed BL series on the platform for the year, behind Revenged Love (#1) from China and Desire (#2) from Hong Kong. The series was also noted by ContentAsia as highlighting Taiwan's continuing leadership in LGBTQ+ storytelling in the Chinese-language market.

The series also performed well on other platforms, reaching the top five on iQIYI International in North America, Vietnam, and Thailand.
