= Reloved =

2025 Thai television series

- เริ่มใหม่หัวใจเดิม
- Genre: Comedy; Romance; Drama; Boys' love
- Written by: Wittawat Sangsakit; Kongkiat Charusakul
- Directed by: Nob Sanathapong Limwongthong
- Country of origin: Thailand
- Original language: Thai
- No. of seasons: 1
- No. of episodes: 10

Production
- Editor: Por Poramin Phimthep
- Running time: 48 minutes
- Production company: Mojo Muse

Original release
- Network: One31
- Release: 29 November 2025 – present

Reloved (Thai: เริ่มใหม่หัวใจเดิม, RTGS: Roem Mai Huachai Doem) is a Thai romantic comedy-drama boys' love television series released in 2025. Starring Sakolrat Puntace (Singto), Paratthakorn Duangsawang (Peter) and Kunavut Jirattikorn (Golf), the series is directed by Sanathapong Limwongthong (Nob) and written by Wittawat Sangsakit and Kongkiat Charusakul. Produced by Mojo Muse, it airs on One31 and is distributed internationally by iQIYI.

== Synopsis ==
Than and Akin dated in the past, but their relationship ended painfully. Years later, they meet again as single fathers and discover that their children attend the same school. Frequent contact during school events forces them to deal with unresolved issues from the past. The series shows whether an old love can survive and be revived after so many complications.

== Cast ==
=== Main ===
- Sakolrat Puntace (Singto) as Atom's father
- Paratthakorn Duangsawang (Peter) as Than
- Kunavut Jirattikorn (Golf) as Akin

=== Supporting ===
- Chotritud Wannaworrawit (Year) as Donlaphat
- Kittaya Iemnopmanee (Cartoon) as Mild
- Rusameekae Fagerlund (James) as Tu
- Rangsit Sirananon (Auan) as Nat
- Waruttha Imraporn (Noey) as Meya
- Amarin Nitibhon as Kan
- Chanokwanun Rakcheep as Da
- Chattiwut Rungrojsuporn (Wut) as Indy

== Production ==
The series was produced by Mojo Muse. A total of 10 episodes were planned. The series was announced as part of One31's programming lineup. The series premiered on 29 November 2025, airing on One31 every Saturday, with episodes running approximately 48 minutes. Internationally, it is available on iQIYI. Kapook described the series as a romantic drama BL project. TrueID highlighted its warm atmosphere and second-chance theme. Dtime News announced the broadcast schedule.

== Awards and nominations ==
Award nominations for RELOVED
Year	Award	Category	Nominee(s)	Result	Ref.
2026	Thailand Y Content Awards 2025	Best Cinematography	RELOVED	Nominated	
