= FOD (streaming service) =

Japanese on-demand media service

- FOD's logo
- Website type: OTT platform
- Available in: Japanese
- Founded: September 2005; 21 years ago
- Headquarters: Japan
- Area served: Japan
- Owner: Fuji Television (Fuji Media Holdings)
- Key people: Jiro Komaki (Founder)
- Industry: Entertainment
- Products: Streaming media; video on demand; digital distribution
- Services: film distribution; television production; television distribution
- Website: fod.fujitv.co.jp
- IPv6 support: Yes
- Commercial: Yes
- Registration: Required
- Users: ▲1.5 million paid subscribers (As of September 2024)
- Launched: September 2005; 21 years ago
- Current status: Active

FOD, originally launched as Fuji TV On Demand (フジテレビオンデマンド), is a Japanese over-the-top, video on-demand, streaming television service, and digital publishing platform, owned and operated by Fuji Television. Introduced in July 2005, the service operates as a digital platform combining video streaming with a library of e-books, digital comics, and digital magazines.

FOD offers a hybrid business model that includes subscription, ad-supported—featuring catch-up distribution for select Fuji Television programs—and transactional on-demand video services. The platform's video catalog includes Fuji Television's terrestrial broadcasts, such as drama series, variety shows, and Noitamina late-night anime block. It also features exclusive original programming, live sports events such as Formula One, and third-party content from domestic and international partners.

As of August 2024, the platform had over 1.5 million paid subscribers, with its applications accumulating over 33 million combined downloads across mobile and smart TV devices. The service has continued to expand its offerings into new formats, including short-form dramas and exclusive live sports broadcasting.

== History ==
=== 2005–2011: Launch and early development ===
Fuji TV On Demand was launched by Fuji Television on July 15, 2005. Initially, the premium video-on-demand service was distributed through partnerships with various internet service providers (ISPs) and content distribution platforms.

During its early stages, the platform's library primarily consisted of original programming from Fuji Television's satellite broadcasting channels (Fuji Television 721 and 739), alongside live events such as the 2005 FIVB Volleyball World Grand Prix and music concerts. At the time of its launch, the distribution of terrestrial television dramas was delayed due to complexities surrounding copyright clearance.

In April 2008, Fuji Television significantly expanded the service by launching its own direct-to-consumer websites for PCs and mobile phones. Internally referred to as the flagship store project, this strategic move allowed the network to establish a direct relationship with viewers independent of third-party ISPs, while still maintaining its existing distribution partnerships. The update introduced a mix of free and premium content, accessible via a free Fuji Television ID registration system.

With the launch of its proprietary platforms, the service's catalog was broadened to include terrestrial broadcasts such as the variety show Idoling!!! and anime series like Skull Man and Mushishi. Fuji Television also began focusing on content specifically tailored for online streaming, offering exclusive spin-offs and digital-only episodes. Despite this digital expansion, the company remained cautious about distributing content on video-sharing platforms like YouTube, citing the necessity of strict anti-piracy measures and the complete removal of illegally uploaded videos as a prerequisite.

In March 2014, the platform expanded into linear internet broadcasting with the launch of Fuji Television NEXTsmart. Positioned by the network as a "fourth television screen" alongside its terrestrial, BS, and CS broadcasts, the 24-hour streaming channel provided a direct simulcast of the Fuji Television NEXT satellite network. This introduced live, real-time coverage of premium sports events, including Formula One and the Bundesliga, as well as live music concerts directly to the service.

=== 2012–2017: Transition to SVOD and rebranding ===
To ensure long-term financial stability and mitigate revenue fluctuations, the platform introduced a subscription video-on-demand (SVOD) monthly membership in April 2012, transitioning away from its strict reliance on a transactional (TVOD) model.

In February 2015, the service expanded its ecosystem by integrating an e-book and digital comic distribution service directly into the platform. This was followed by the addition of electronic novels on June 1, 2015, featuring tie-ins to currently airing terrestrial television dramas, such as Jun Ikeido's Yōkoso, Wagaya e. This media synergy allowed users to seamlessly purchase and consume the original source materials of popular live-action and anime adaptations.

On May 29, 2015, Fuji Television established a mutual content-sharing partnership with Hulu Japan. This strategic agreement allowed FOD to further diversify its streaming library by acquiring popular overseas television series, such as The Walking Dead, while licensing its own critically acclaimed Noitamina anime titles, including Psycho-Pass, to Hulu's platform.

On August 1, 2015, the service underwent a major renewal and was officially rebranded under the abbreviation FOD, adopting a new red-themed logo. This relaunch marked a strategic shift towards a comprehensive entertainment platform. The update included the addition of digital magazines and the restructuring of its unlimited anime streaming tier. Formerly restricted to Fuji Television's late-night Noitamina block, the tier was significantly broadened to include over 1,000 episodes across 28 titles, featuring series like Nobunaga Concerto and content from rival networks. Concurrently, FOD debuted its first exclusive original short anime series, Osiris no Tenbin.

Driven by this expanded catalog, which successfully attracted a diverse demographic including a notably high proportion of female users, the platform achieved profitability by October 2015. At that time, FOD reported 800,000 paid subscribers and 2 million monthly active users, establishing it as the largest streaming service operated by a Japanese commercial broadcaster.

By 2016, Fuji Television had solidified a unique digital strategy that differentiated it from other major Japanese commercial broadcasters. While participating in the joint commercial broadcaster catch-up service TVer, Fuji Television opted to route users from TVer back to its own proprietary FOD application rather than hosting playback directly on the shared platform. This approach was central to the network's strategy of creating a self-contained ecosystem where users could seamlessly circulate between free catch-up television, premium video, and digital publications. Crucially, the company deliberately sought to dilute its strict association with the Fuji Television brand, curating a diverse library that included third-party content to attract a broader audience.

On August 1, 2016, the service launched FOD Premium, a comprehensive subscription video-on-demand (SVOD) tier. Replacing its previous, more fragmented monthly plans, FOD Premium offered unlimited access to a vast library of domestic and international films, overseas dramas, and exclusive original programming alongside Fuji Television's terrestrial broadcasts. Furthermore, the subscription integrated unlimited access to a selection of digital magazines, cementing FOD's position as a multifaceted digital entertainment platform.

=== 2018–2024: Smart TV expansion and subscriber growth ===
In March 2018, Fuji Television expanded FOD's accessibility to smart TVs and connected devices by launching dedicated applications for Android TV, Amazon Fire TV, and Apple TV, initially supporting only the premium SVOD tier. Concurrently, the platform's free ad-supported catch-up service experienced rapid growth in viewership. By October 2018, the catch-up broadcast of the television drama Suits,a remake of the American series of the same name, generated over 900,000 streams within its first week, setting a new viewership record for a single episode on the platform.

In April 2019, the free catch-up service was fully integrated into the smart TV applications, allowing users to watch missed broadcasts on television screens alongside the premium content. FOD also continued to diversify its live programming, notably acquiring the streaming rights for all home games of the Tokyo Yakult Swallows baseball team for the 2019 season. Driven by the expansion to connected TVs and the unified integration of free and paid tiers, the FOD mobile application surpassed 12 million downloads, while its smart TV counterpart reached 1 million downloads by October 2019. The platform continued its steady growth, surpassing one million paid subscribers by November 2022. Throughout 2023, FOD broadened its accessibility by launching the FOD Channel for Prime Video for Amazon Prime subscribers, and expanding its application support to PlayStation 5 consoles and additional smart TV brands.

By mid-2024, the service had achieved significant milestones. In July 2024, the FOD mobile application reached 23 million cumulative downloads, while its smart TV counterpart surpassed 10 million downloads. Concurrently, Fuji Television's free ad-supported catch-up streams broke national commercial broadcasting records, exceeding 100 million monthly views across its distribution network. To further diversify its premium catalog, FOD partnered with Video Market in June 2024 to offer major Hollywood titles from studios such as Walt Disney Pictures and Warner Bros. Driven by this expanded library, classic Fuji Television dramas, and exclusive live events, the platform's paid subscriber base exceeded 1.5 million in August 2024.

=== 2025–present: Short-form content and sports acquisitions ===
Adapting to the growing demand for mobile-optimized content, Fuji Television expanded its streaming ecosystem in 2025 with the launch of FOD SHORT. This dedicated application marked the network's entry into the vertical short drama market, combining its traditional television production expertise with the established FOD infrastructure to deliver original, bite-sized live-action series formatted for smartphone screens.

In late 2025, FOD continued to expand its live sports offerings by providing free, comprehensive live streaming of the 93rd All Japan Speed Skating Championships in December, which served as the final domestic qualifiers for the 2026 Winter Olympics.

Entering 2026, Fuji Television significantly bolstered its sports portfolio by securing an exclusive five-year all-rights agreement for Formula One in Japan, covering the 2026 through 2030 seasons. Coinciding with the network's 40th anniversary of F1 coverage, the deal consolidated linear and digital distribution rights. As part of this major expansion, FOD established a first-of-its-kind partnership with Formula 1's official streaming service, integrating F1 TV Pro and F1 TV Premium into its platform. This allowed FOD to provide live coverage of all sessions across the 24-race calendar, aligning its digital streaming strategy with the return of select F1 races to Fuji Television's terrestrial network for the first time in 11 years.

== Programming ==
As of 2023, FOD operates on three main pillars: video streaming (encompassing over 15,000 episodes), live broadcasting, and a massive digital publishing ecosystem.

=== Catch-up television and library content ===
FOD serves as the primary catch-up television platform for Fuji TV. The free, ad-supported catch-up service, initially launched as +7 in January 2015 to combat piracy and encourage real-time viewing, offers the latest episodes of terrestrial programs for seven days after their broadcast. Since April 2021, Fuji TV's catch-up streams have been fully integrated for direct playback within the national commercial broadcaster portal, TVer.

The platform's premium video library is highly regarded for its extensive archive of Fuji TV's classic terrestrial programming. The catalog features iconic dramas from the 1980s to the 2000s, such as Kita no Kuni kara (1981–1982), Tokyo Love Story (1991), Bayside Shakedown (1997), and Nodame Cantabile (2006), including older titles that were never released on DVD. It also houses popular variety shows like Run for Money (Tosochu). Furthermore, the catalog is supplemented by content from affiliated regional networks (such as Kansai Television), rival domestic broadcasters (including NHK and WOWOW), and a robust selection of international and Korean dramas. The platform also offers 24-hour linear simulcasts of Fuji TV's three premium satellite channels (ONE, TWO, and NEXT).

=== Original programming ===
The platform heavily invests in exclusive original content, ranging from live-action dramas and reality television to variety shows and animation. During its early stages, Fuji TV entered a strategic co-production agreement with Netflix to produce original series such as the drama Atelier (2015) and reality shows like Terrace House (2012–2020), which were distributed on both platforms.

In subsequent years, FOD continued to produce exclusive live-action adaptations, including a modern remake of the iconic 1991 romantic drama Tokyo Love Story (2020). Recently, the service has found notable success in producing Boys' Love (BL) adaptations and romantic comedies, such as the hit 2024 drama Perfect Propose. Adapting to modern viewing habits, Fuji TV expanded the platform's ecosystem with the launch of FOD SHORT in late 2024, a dedicated section for vertical, bite-sized live-action dramas optimized for smartphone consumption. Additionally, FOD produces exclusive content featuring Fuji TV's own roster of news anchors and announcers under the FOD Anamaga banner.

=== Sports broadcasting ===
Live sports streaming is a major pillar of FOD Premium's programming. The platform provides extensive coverage of professional domestic baseball, holding the streaming rights to all home games of Tokyo Yakult Swallows and Yokohama DeNA BayStars, alongside domestic soccer tournaments like the J.League YBC Levain Cup.

It is also recognized as a primary broadcaster for winter sports, particularly figure skating in Japan. The service provides extensive, unedited live streams of major domestic and international competitions, including the World Figure Skating Championships and the All Japan Figure Skating Championships. Motorsports represents another cornerstone of the catalog; beginning in 2026, Fuji TV secured an exclusive five-year all-rights agreement for Formula One in Japan, providing live coverage of all sessions across the racing calendar through a direct partnership with F1 TV.

=== Anime ===
The service is tightly integrated with the network's Noitamina and +Ultra late-night programming blocks, frequently securing exclusive streaming rights or early distribution windows for highly anticipated series. Notable exclusive titles have included Keep Your Hands Off Eizouken!, Akudama Drive, and the third season of Golden Kamuy. A significant draw for the service is its dedicated Unlimited Anime tier, which offers thousands of episodes encompassing both classic properties and current simulcasts from Fuji TV and third-party networks, including popular franchises like Psycho-Pass.

=== Digital publishing ===
A unique distinguishing feature of FOD compared to traditional SVOD platforms is its integrated digital publishing service. The platform offers an extensive digital bookstore featuring over 150,000 manga volumes and electronic novels across 40,000 titles, supported by an offline reading application called FOD Manga.

This ecosystem is designed to create media synergy; users can seamlessly purchase and read the original manga or novel source material of a live-action drama or anime series they are currently watching on the same platform. Notably, Fuji TV utilizes FOD as an IP incubator; original manga titles published digitally on the platform have been subsequently adapted into live-action dramas exclusively for the streaming service. Furthermore, FOD provides premium subscribers with an "all-you-can-read" digital magazine service granting unlimited access to over 100 popular Japanese lifestyle, fashion, and weekly publications.
