= Watcha =

South Korean online streaming platform

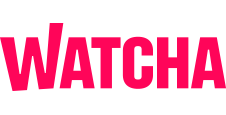
- Native name: 왓챠
- Website type: OTT platform
- Founded: September 2011; 15 years ago (company); January 31, 2016; 10 years ago (OTT)
- Area served: South Korea
- Key people: Park Tae-hun (founder)

Watcha (Korean: 왓챠) is a South Korean software company and subscription video on-demand, over-the-top service. Watcha distributes television series, specials, variety shows, films, documentaries, animations, and sports. Watcha began its original webtoon service in the second half of 2022.

In August 2025, when creditor Enlight Ventures filed for corporate rehabilitation due to Watcha's failure to refinance 49 billion won worth of convertible bonds, the Seoul Bankruptcy Court initiated corporate restructuring proceedings for Watcha. As of the end of 2024, Watcha's cumulative losses exceed 267 billion won.

== Original programming ==
=== Television series ===
- Next Door Witch J (2021)
- Damn Good Company (2021–2022)
- Semantic Error (2022)
- Alice, the Ultimate Weapon (2022)
- Recipe for Farewell (2022)
- The King of Desert (2022)
- The Destiny Changer (2024)

=== Film ===
- Unframed (2021)
- Semantic Error: The Movie (2022)

=== Variety show ===
- Double Trouble (2021)
- Join My Table (2022)
- Goblin Who Steals Wisdom (2022)
- No Ki Deuk Zone (2022)
- Inside Lyrics (2022)

=== Documentary ===
- Hanwha Eagles: Clubhouse (2022)
- Let Them Dance (2023)
- Feel the Blink (2023)

== Watcha Pedia ==
Watcha Pedia is a movie review website operated by Watcha.
