= Rakuten Viki =

American video streaming service

- Company type: Subsidiary
- Website type: OTT platform
- Available in: English
- Founded: 2007; 19 years ago
- Headquarters: San Mateo, California, United States
- Country of origin: United States
- Area served: Worldwide
- Founders: Razmig Hovaghimian; Changseong Ho; Vikram Bhatta; Jiwon Moon
- Products: Streaming media; Video on demand
- Parent: Rakuten Group
- Website: www.viki.com
- Advertising: Supported
- Registration: Optional
- Users: 70+ million (2024)
- Launched: December 2010
- Current status: Active

Rakuten Viki is an American over-the-top streaming television service owned by Rakuten. It is available in premium subscription video on-demand and free ad-supported tiers. The service specializes in Asian television series and films, particularly Korean drama, Chinese, Taiwanese, and Japanese productions, which are distributed globally with community-created subtitles.

Users can watch content with subtitles provided in more than 200 languages through a crowdsourced translation system. Headquartered in San Mateo, California, the company operates additional offices in Singapore, Tokyo, and Seoul.

The name Viki is a portmanteau of the words video and wiki, reflecting the platform's reliance on volunteer communities to create subtitles and translations for international audiences.

Viki won the TechCrunch Crunchie Award for Best International Startup in 2011. The platform was later acquired by Rakuten in 2013 and integrated into the company's global digital content ecosystem.

== History ==
=== 2007–2012: Early years ===
Viki was founded in 2007 by Razmig Hovaghimian, Changseong Ho and Jiwon Moon. Funding for the company originally came from Neoteny Labs, a Singapore-based start-up fund headed by Joichi Ito, and from the co-founder of LinkedIn, Reid Hoffman.

The company moved to Singapore in 2008 to take advantage of government backing and the city-state's role as a pan-Asian hub. In December 2010, Viki exited the beta phase of its software and made its services available to the general public. It was purchased by Rakuten in 2013.

In September 2011, Viki debuted a new iPhone app called Viki On-The-Go, allowing users to watch content on their smartphones. The company also partnered with Samsung Southeast Asia that year to develop an Android app. Viki.com drew 14 million unique views in August 2011. Viki raised $20 million from Greylock Partners, Andreessen Horowitz, and BBC Worldwide in October of that year.

In May 2012, Viki announced deals with Warner Music Group, SEED Music Group of Taiwan, and LOEN Entertainment of South Korea, bringing thousands of music videos to the site. In that same month, BBC Worldwide announced an extension of its relationship with Viki, including a deal to work with the company on advertising.

In July 2012, Viki signed a non-exclusive deal with the Chinese social network Renren, in which Viki would provide a video site for the social network called VikiZone. The deal includes only a portion of the Viki catalog and is offered for free.

=== 2013–present: Purchase by Rakuten ===
In the year following its acquisition by Japanese technology conglomerate Rakuten in 2013, Viki went from about 22 million monthly active users with 10 million on mobile to 35 million monthly active users and 25 million mobile users.

The company has a list of partners for sourcing original content, including BBC Worldwide. The company has also signed distribution deals for its original content with Hulu, Netflix, Yahoo!, MSN, NBC, and A&E, as well as TVB in Hong Kong, SBS in South Korea, Fuji TV in Japan and Amedia in Russia.

== Services ==
Viki streams premium licensed content in a similar way that Hulu does in U.S. markets. The site then puts the content on one of its channels, and the content can be subtitled by community volunteers. Community members can subtitle their favorite videos in their preferred languages, under a Creative Commons license using Viki's subtitling technology, enabling individuals to collaborate globally, in dozens of languages at once. The subtitling software developed for the company allows many volunteers to translate a video concurrently in up to 160 languages. Viki also syndicates its shows with fan-generated subtitles to partners such as Hulu, Netflix, and Yahoo!, and receives fees and revenue from those distributors. Of the approximately 200 language subtitles available on the site, roughly 50 of these are vulnerable or endangered languages.

== Original programming ==
Viki has more than 100 original programs, including entertainment shows, drama and mini-series.

- Dramaworld (2016)
- Where Your Eyes Linger (2020)
- Light on Me (2021)
- Bad Memory Eraser (2024)
- DNA Lover (2024)
- My Girlfriend Is the Man! (2025)

== External ==
- Official website
- Coolest Offices in Singapore - Viki Office Tour
