= GagaOOLala =

Video on demand service specializing in LGBTQ content

- Website type: OTT platform
- Available in: English; Simplified Chinese; Traditional Chinese; Thai
- Headquarters: Taipei, Taiwan
- Area served: Worldwide
- Founder: Jay Lin
- Products: GagaOOLala app; GagaOOLala Originals
- Services: Video on demand; Television production; Digital distribution; Web syndication
- Website: www.gagaoolala.com
- Registration: Required
- Users: 5 million (As of 2025)
- Launched: November 11, 2016

GagaOOLala is a Taiwan-based worldwide over-the-top, subscription video on demand, streaming television service specializing in uncensored LGBTQ-related films, LGBTQ TV films & LGBTQ TV drama series. It has partnered with Japanese-based Line TV, initially in Thailand, and then across Asia, to provide the service with GagaOOLala-produced series. GagaOOLala is owned by Portico Media, which also carried pay TV channels for Taiwan cable TV provider along with Chunghwa Telecom's MOD platform.

The service launched in March 2017, initially only in Taiwan, before rolling out to the 10 ASEAN nations in South East Asia in 2017, Hong Kong and Macau in 2018 and the rest of Asia in 2019. GagaOOLala became available globally, except in mainland China and North Korea, by May 2020.

It is the first LGBTQ-focused OTT service in Asia. The GagaOOLala catalog includes films, short videos, documentaries, television series, and original content.

== History ==
Portico Media is one of the co-founders of the Taiwan International Queer Film Festival and was in charge of the organization of the festival during its first three editions (2014, 2015, 2016). However, Jay Lin still found the film festival experience limiting regarding the availability of LGBTQ content for Asian audiences and decided to establish Asia's first LGBTQ-streaming platform, GagaOOLala. GagaOOLala was first launched in Taiwan on November 11, 2016. Its first expansion into the Asian market took place with the launch in the 10 countries that conform ASEAN in Southeast Asia on April 28, 2017. On May 13, 2018, GagaOOLala was launched in Hong Kong and Macau. On June 14, 2019, the streaming service started operations in all of South Asia. The company made the announcement together with a distribution tie-in with KASHISH Mumbai International Queer Film Festival. On May 15, 2020, GagaOOLala became available globally.

=== Activism ===
On October 28, 2016, GagaOOLala celebrated the first ever Queermosa Gala, an award ceremony "to bring broad media visibility to the people and companies working hard to have LGBTQ voices heard in Taiwan." The ceremony was supported by GLAAD. Among the first year winner's were television host Dee Hsu, singer A-Mei and rights activist Chi Chia-wei.

During the Taipei Pride celebrations of 2018, GagaOOLala, GagaTai and LalaTai organized together with the Singaporean fashion photographer Leslie Kee the photography exhibition Out in Taiwan. The project was composed of black-and-white portraits of LGBTQ people living in Taiwan in order to humanize the LGBTQ community.

GagaOOLala is also one of the five founding members of the Marriage Equality Coalition Taiwan, one of the main LGBTQ rights group in Taiwan. The organization was one of the main driving forces behind the passing of the same-sex marriage law in Taiwan on May 17, 2019, making it the first country in Asia.

=== Name ===
In a 2019 interview, Jay Lin, CEO of GagaOOLala, revealed the story behind the name: "Lala' and 'gaga' are slang terms for lesbian and gay in Chinese. The 'oo' comes from the French 'ou' which means 'or'".

== Content ==
The platform currently hosts more than 1,000 LGBTQ titles including feature films, shorts, documentaries, and series worldwide but with a focus on Asian queer cinema. It is the home for the films of international queer directors like Zero Chou, Simon Chung, Kit Hung, Stanley Kwan, Scud, Cui Zi'en, Loo Zihan, Yonfan, Marco Berger, Antony Hickling or Joselito Altarejos, and the distributor in Asia of international hit titles like Blue is the Warmest Color, Moonlight, Front Cover or Weekend.

=== Original Content ===
GagaOOLala has produced original content since its launch date. In 2016, they produced Ting-Chun Huang short film Sodom's Cat, one of the first R-rated queer stories from the island's filmography. The film was selected at that year's Outfest, Frameline and nominated to the Iris Prize.

The next year, 2017, GagaOOLala produced its first feature film, Tale of the Lost Boys, by Filipino director Joselito Altarejos. The film, a Taiwanese-Filipino cross-cultural story that tackles issues of sexuality and self-identity, was awarded Best Picture, Best Screenplay, Best Editing, and Best Office Award at Sinag Maynila Film Festival. That same year, the platform also commissioned its first original series Queer Taiwan, an episodic documentary about the circumstances that have made of Taiwan a beacon for LGBTQ rights in Asia and, eventually, the first country in the continent to legalize same-sex marriage. The first season focused on four main topics in Taiwan: religion and the marriage equality movement, the drag culture, sex and disability, and surrogacy.

In 2018, Queer Taiwan was renewed for a second season and re-branded as Queer Asia. The move to four new different territories (Hong Kong, the Philippines, Japan and Vietnam), "to highlight the steep cultural differences in Asia within the LGBTQ community".

In 2024, GagaOOLala unveiled their first co-production with Japanese broadcaster TV Tokyo on yaoi manga adaptation At 25:00, in Akasaka; the series will be premiere simultaneously with the Japanese broadcast.

=== GOL Studios ===
In March 2019, GagaOOLala launched GOL Studios, a crowd-sourcing platform to assist in the production and distribution of LGBTQ content around the world. GOL Studios is open to all filmmakers, where they can upload any projects they are working on, request resources, and connect with other film professionals. The platform will bring more original content into GagaOOLala. In its first year, GOL Studios commissioned 11 projects that will be released in 2020. Among the selected projects are Hong Kong independent film director Kit Hung's latest project Forever 17, a Zero Chou's new film and series, and the surrogacy-themed documentary Made in Boise, that premiered in 2019 at Independent Lens on PBS.
