= Taro no To =

Japanese television series

Taro no To (Japanese title TAROの塔) is a 2011 dorama created by NHK. Directed by NHK employees Yoshihiko Nagikawa and Mitsuhiro Fukui, it stars Suzuki Matsuo as Okamoto Taro during his rise to fame and the construction of the Tower of the Sun in Osaka.

== Overview ==
The drama aired on Saturdays beginning at 9:00 on February 26, 2011, a special 4-episode series to commemorate 100 years since the establishment of NHK. The broadcast was disrupted and schedule changed due to the Tohoku earthquake on March 11th that year.

== Cast ==
- Okamoto Taro - Matsuo Suzuki
- Okamoto Toshiko - Takako Tokiwa - Taro's wife
- Okamoto Ippei - Tanabe Seiichi - Taro's father, a famous writer and manga artist
- Okamtoto Kanako - Terashima Shinobu - Taro's mother, a writer
- Okazaki Kozo - Nishida Toshiyuki
- Tange Kenzo - Kohinata Fumiyo - famous architect
- Togo Seiji - Nakao Akira

== Staff ==
- Script - Ohmori Sumio
- Producers - Kitamura Nobuhiko
- Directors - Yoshihiko Nagikawa and Mitsuhiro Fukui
- Camera - Soma Kazunori
- Soundtrack - Haishima Kuniaki
- Kappore director - Sakuragawa Pinsuke
