= Suzuki Matsuo =

Apanese theatre director, actor and writer (born 1962)

Matsuo Suzuki 松尾スズキ
- Born: Katsuyuki Matsuo (松尾 勝幸); 15 December 1962 (age 63); Kitakyushu, Fukuoka, Japan
- Occupations: Theatre director, actor, novelist, screenwriter

Suzuki Matsuo (松尾 スズキ, Matsuo Suzuki; born 15 December 1962) is a Japanese theatre director, actor, novelist, and screenwriter.

== Career ==
Born in Kitakyushu, Fukuoka, Suzuki started his own theatre troupe, Otona Keikaku, in 1988 and was joined by such talent as Kankuro Kudo and Sadao Abe. He won the Kishida Prize for Drama in 1997 for Fankī! Uchū wa mieru tokoro made shika nai. In addition to acting and directing, he also writes, and won the Japan Academy Prize for Screenplay of the Year in 2008 for Tokyo Tower: Mom and Me, and Sometimes Dad. As a novelist, he has twice been nominated for the Akutagawa Prize.

== Selected filmography ==
=== As director ===
- Otakus in Love (2004)
- Female (2005) segment "Yoru no Shita (Licking Nights)"
- Welcome to the Quiet Room (2007)
- Jinuyo Saraba: Kamuroba Mura e (2015)
- 108: Revenge and Adventure of Goro Kaiba (2019)

=== As actor ===
==== Film ====
- Ichi the Killer (2001)
- Be with You (2004)
- Yaji and Kita: The Midnight Pilgrims (2005)
- Forbidden Siren (2006)
- The Shock Labyrinth (2009)
- Tada's Do-It-All House (2011)
- Shin Godzilla (2016)
- Tornado Girl (2017)
- Louder!: Don't See What You Are Singing (2018)
- Dragon Quest: Your Story (2019)
- 108: Revenge and Adventure of Goro Kaiba (2019) - Gorō Kaiba
- Kaiji: Final Game (2020)
- I Am Makimoto (2022)
- Shin Kamen Rider (2023)

==== Television ====
- Taro no To (2011) - Okamoto Taro
- Amachan (2013)
- Chikaemon (2016) – Chikamatsu Monzaemon
- Miotsukushi Ryōrichō (2017)
- Idaten (2019) – Tachibanaya Enkyō IV
- Sanctuary (2023) – Inushima-oyakata
- Queen of Mars (2025) – Keito Shiraishi
