= Redhorse Osaka Wheel =

Ferris wheel in Suita, Japan

Coordinates: 34°48′22.5″N 135°32′5.1″E

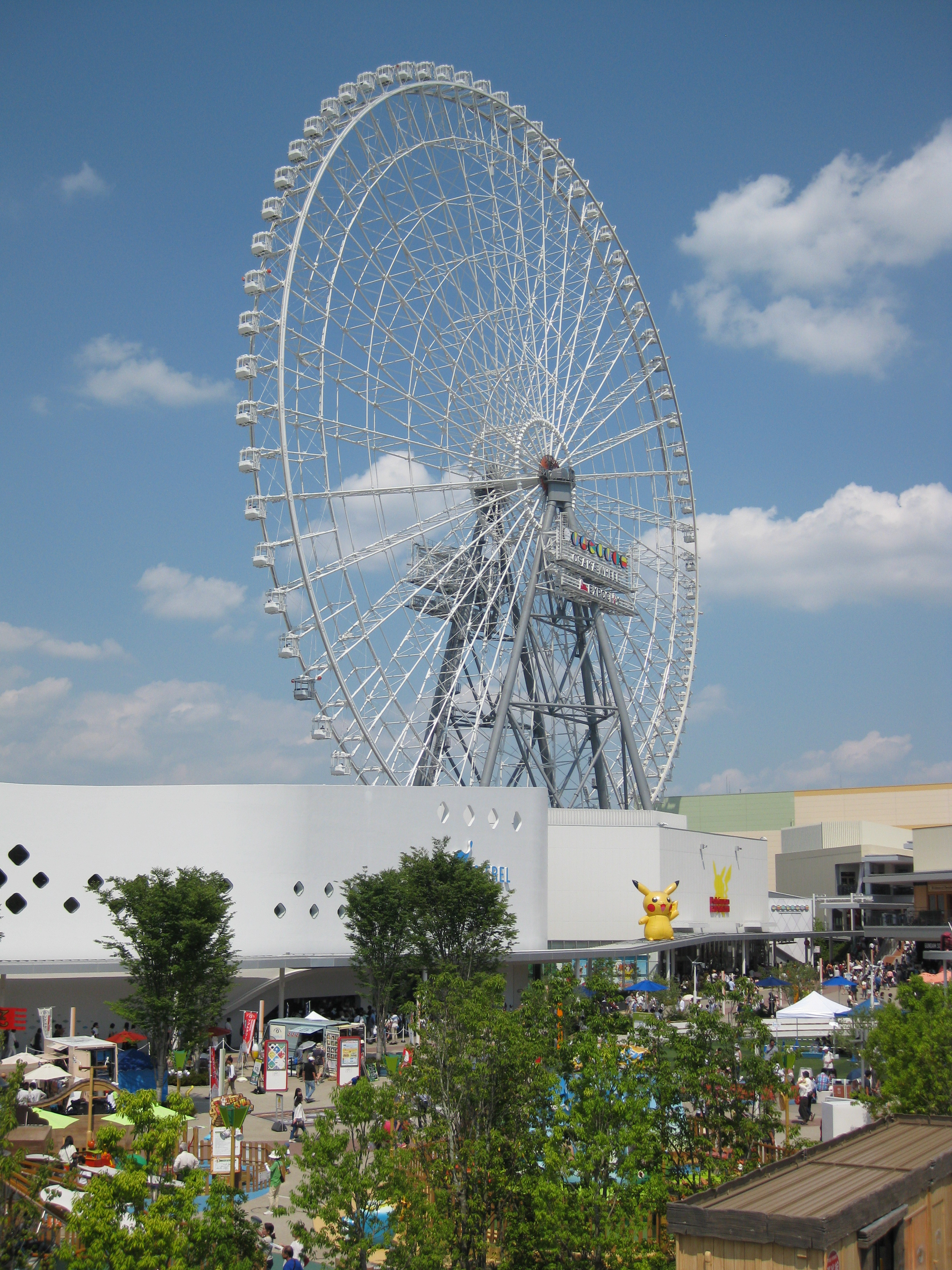
Redhorse Osaka Wheel

Redhorse Osaka Wheel is a 123-metre (404 ft) tall, 118.3-metre (388 ft) diameter giant Ferris wheel at Expocity in Suita, Osaka Prefecture, Japan.

Installed in the Expo Commemoration Park, in the city of Suita. Inaugurated in 2016, it has 72 gondolas. From the gondolas, you can look down at the "Tower of the Sun", symbol of Expo '70.

== Safety ==
The base of this wheel has a seismic isolation, as safety in case of seismic movements.

== History ==
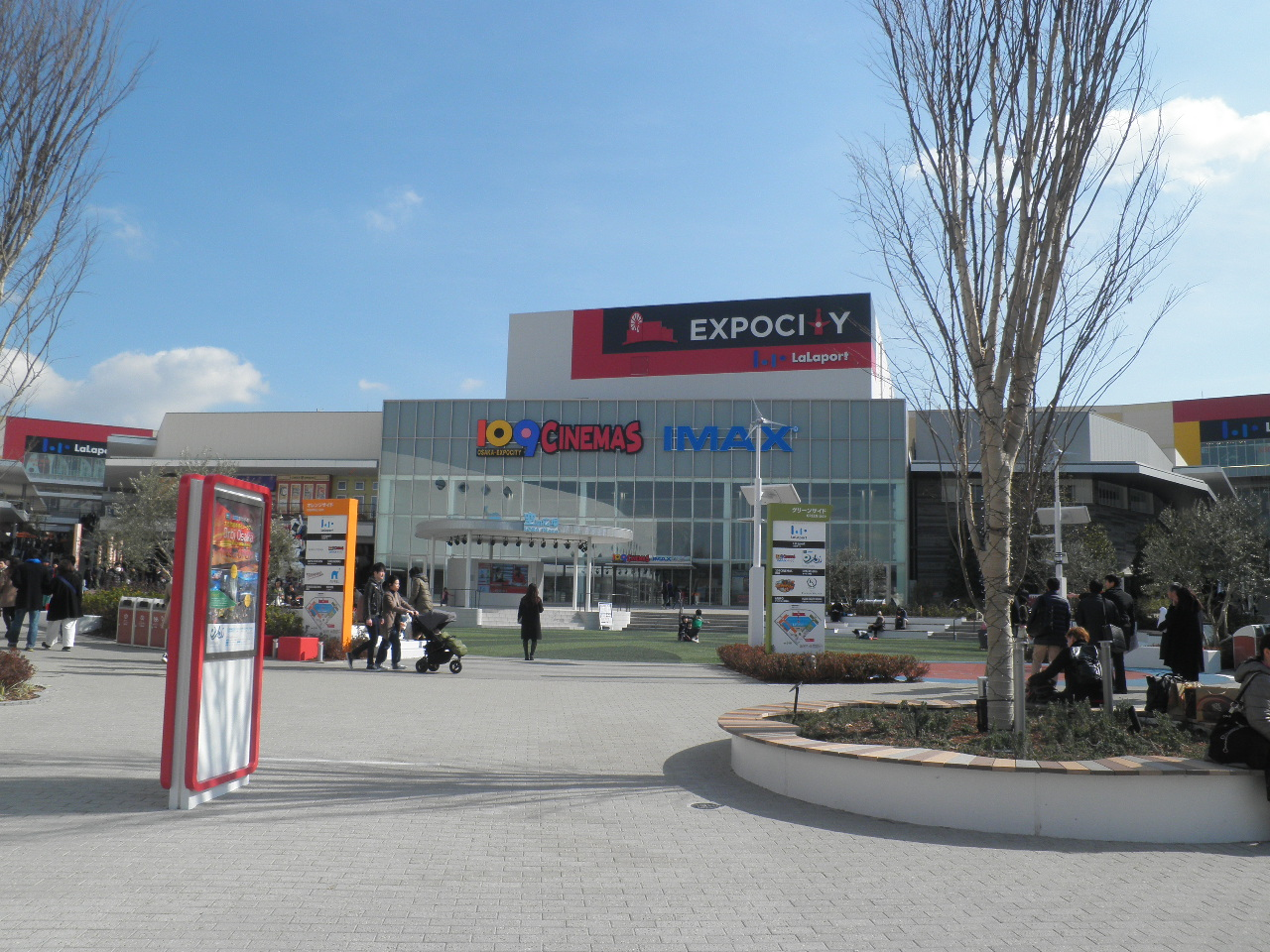
Expocity opened in 2015

A Ferris wheel has been built three times on the same site.

The first wheel that existed in the place, the so-called “Wonder Wheel”, installed in 1970 during the Expo '70 and lasted there until 1986.

The second wheel was the Technocosmos, which after finishing Expo '85 in Tsukuba, was moved to Suita city in 1986 and renamed Technostar. It was dismantled in 2009, when Expoland was closed.

The third wheel is the one named in this article, Redhorse Osaka Wheel, installed in 2016; as part of Expocity created in 2015.

The height of the three wheels has increased over time (40 m → 85 m → 123 m), and the number of gondolas has also increased (24 → 48 → 72).
