= Expo '70 =

World's fair held in Osaka Prefecture, Japan

1970 Osaka
- Logo designed by Takeshi Otaka

Overview
- BIE-class: Universal exposition
- Category: First category General Exposition
- Name: Expo 70
- Motto: Progress and Harmony for Mankind
- Building(s): Symbol Zone's space frame
- Area: 330 hectares (820 acres)
- Visitors: 64,218,770

Participant(s)
- Countries: 78 along with 4 international organizations

Location
- Country: Japan
- City: Osaka
- Venue: Suita
- Coordinates: 34°48′31″N 135°32′6.8″E

Timeline
- Awarded: September 14, 1965
- Opening: March 15, 1970
- Closure: September 13, 1970

Universal expositions
- Previous: Expo 67 in Montreal
- Next: Seville Expo '92 in Seville

Specialized Expositions
- Previous: HemisFair '68 in San Antonio
- Next: Expo 71 in Budapest

Horticultural expositions
- Previous: Paris 1969 in Paris
- Next: Floriade (Netherlands) 1972 in Amsterdam

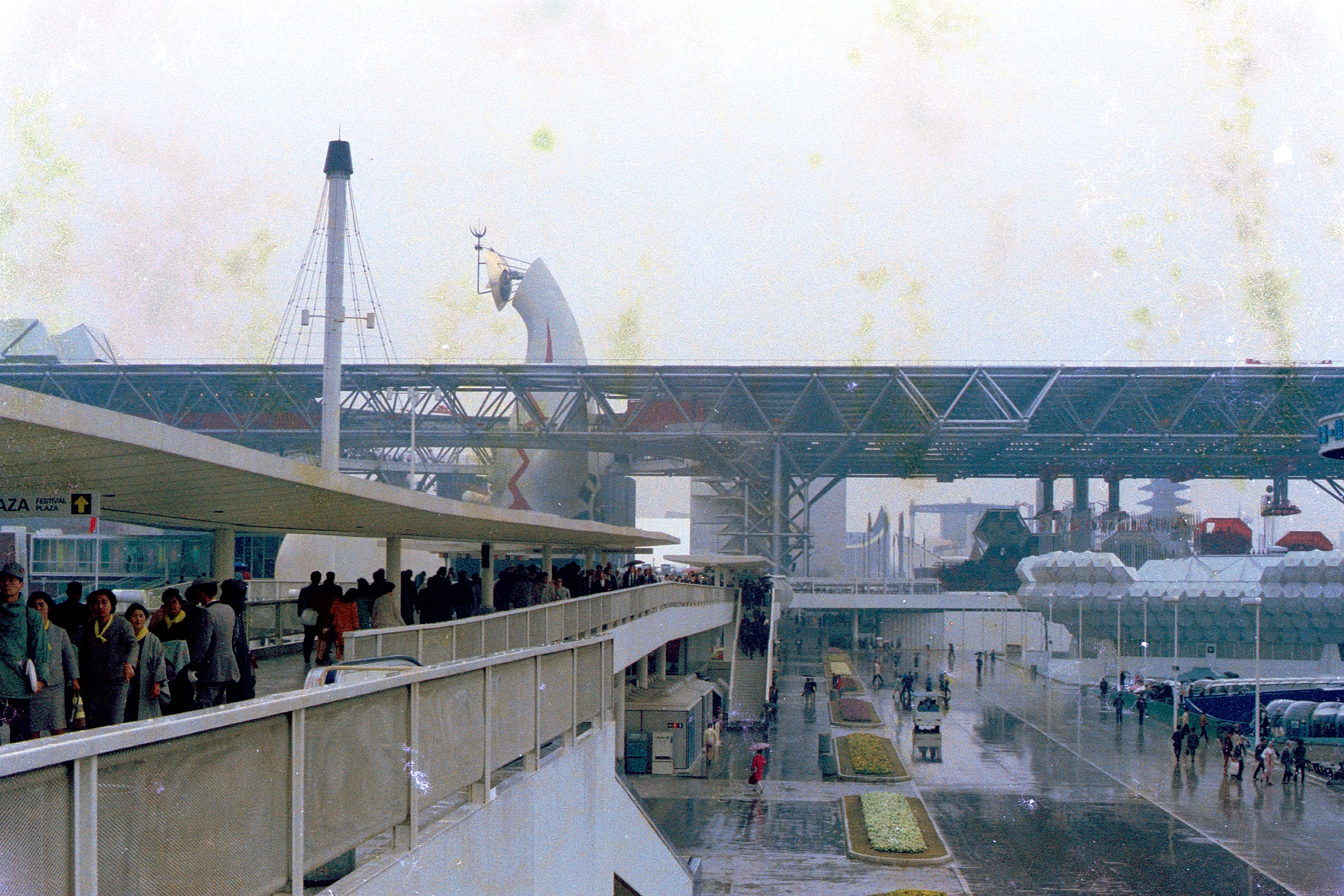
Space frame roof of the Festival Plaza, Osaka Expo, 1970

The Japan World Exposition, Osaka, 1970 (日本万国博覧会, Nihon Bankoku Hakuran-kai) or Expo '70 was a world's fair held in Suita, (Note: Suita is within the Osaka metropolitan area and effectively a suburb of the city of Osaka. So depending on context, references to the exposition may identify its location as either Suita (specifically) or Osaka (more generally).) Osaka Prefecture, Japan, between 15 March and 13 September 1970. Its theme was "Progress and Harmony for Mankind." In Japanese, Expo '70 is often referred to as Ōsaka Banpaku (大阪万博). It was the first world's fair held in Japan as well as in Asia.

The Expo was designed by Japanese architect Kenzō Tange, assisted by 12 other Japanese architects. Bridging the site along a north–south axis was the Symbol Zone. Planned on three levels, it was primarily a social space with a unifying space frame roof.

The Expo attracted international attention for the extent to which unusual artworks and designs by Japanese avant-garde artists were incorporated into the overall plan and individual national and corporate pavilions. The most famous of these artworks is artist Tarō Okamoto's iconic Tower of the Sun, which remains on the site.

== Background ==
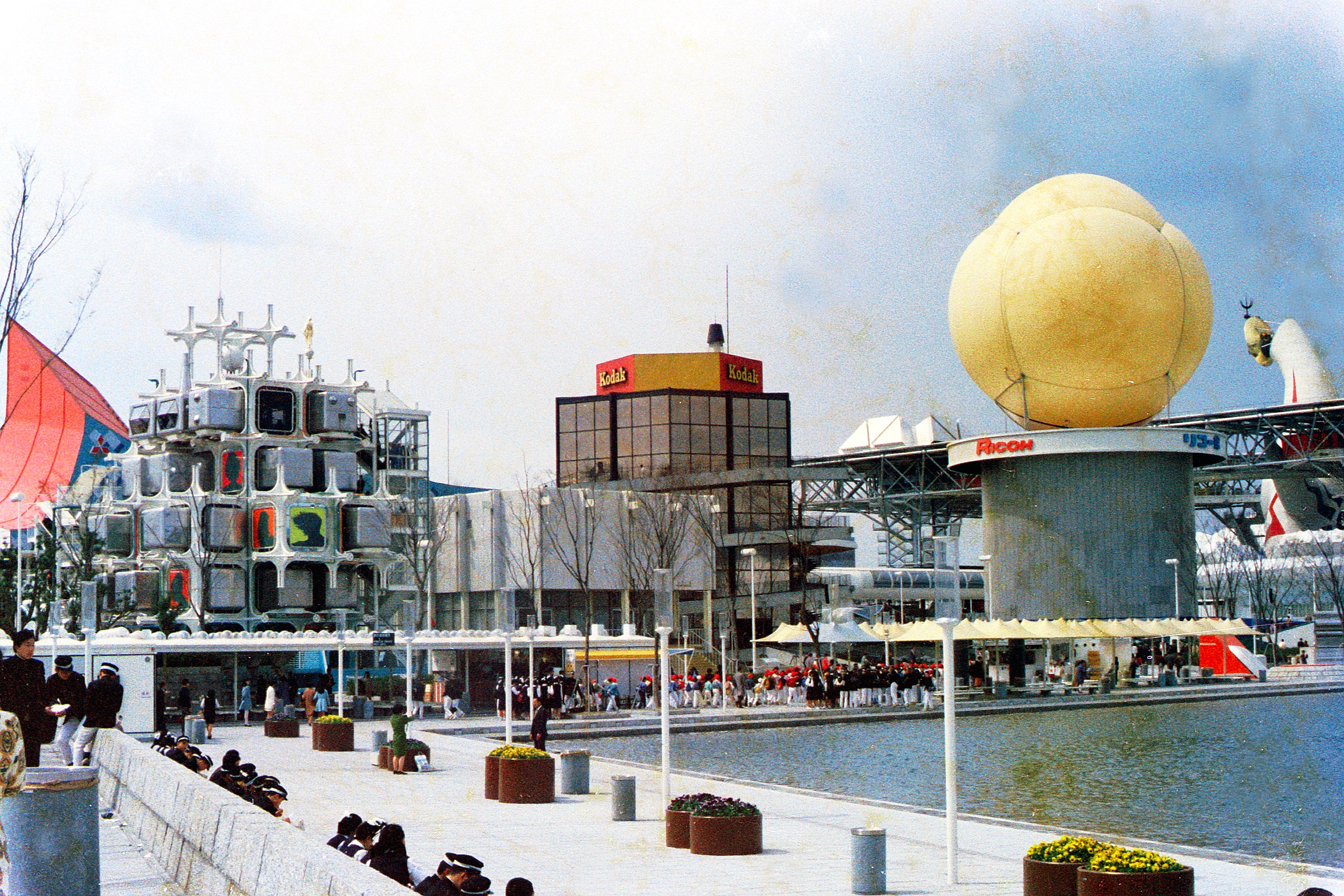
Osaka Expo '70 Kodak & Ricoh pavilion

Osaka was chosen as the site for the 1970 World Exposition by the Bureau International des Expositions (BIE) in 1965. 330 hectares in the Senri Hills outside Osaka had been earmarked for the site and a Theme Committee under the chairmanship of Seiji Kaya was formed. Kenzo Tange and Uzo Nishiyama were appointed to produce the master plan for the Expo. The main theme would be Progress and Harmony for Mankind. Tange invited 12 other architects to elucidate designs for elements within the master plan. These architects included: Arata Isozaki for the Festival Plaza mechanical, electrical and electronic installations; and Kiyonori Kikutake for the Landmark Tower.

== Master plan ==
Two main principles guided the master plan. The first was the idea that the wisdom of all the world's peoples would converge here to inspire new ideas; the second was that it should be less an exposition and more a festival. Unlike earlier expositions, the designers aimed to create a central, unifying Festival Plaza where people could gather and socialise. They called this the Symbol Zone and covered it and the themed pavilions with a giant space frame roof.

The designers liked the idea that, like the 1851 Great Exhibition in London, the roof of the Symbol Zone could be a unifying entity for the expo. They did not want the constraint imposed by the London Exhibition of having everything contained under one roof, so the space frame contained only the Festival Plaza and themed pavilions. Tange compared the concept to a tree. The idea was that although the national pavilions were like individual flowers they needed to be connected to the whole via branches and a trunk. Thus the Symbol Zone became the trunk and the moving pedestrian walkways and sub-plazas became the branches. These elements were reinforced with colour, with the trunk and branches in plain white and the pavilions in their own colours that were determined by the national architects.

The Symbol Zone ran north–south across the site, spanning an arterial road running east–west. The Festival Plaza was to the north of road and had the main gate on its southern end. To the north of the main gate and central to the Festival Plaza was the Tower of the Sun from which visitors could join pedestrian walkways that travelled out towards the north, south, east and west gates.

The Theme Space under the space frame was divided into three levels, each designed by the artist Tarō Okamoto, The underground level represented the past and was a symbol of the source of humanity. The surface level represented the present, symbolising the dynamism of human interaction. The space frame represented the future and a world where humanity and technology would be joined. Tange envisioned that the exhibition for the future would be like an aerial city and he asked Fumihiko Maki, Noboru Kawazoe, Koji Kamiya and Noriaki Kurokawa to design it. The Theme Space was also punctuated by three towers: the Tower of the Sun, the Tower of Maternity and the Tower of Youth.

To the north of the Theme Space was the Festival Plaza. This was a flexible space that contained a flat area and stepped terrace. The plaza could be rearranged to provide for different requirements for seating capacity, from 1500 to 10000. The flexibility extended to the lighting and audio visual equipment allowing for a range of musical performances and electronic presentations. Festival Plaza was covered by the world's first large-scale, transparent membrane roof. It was designed by Tange and structural engineer Yoshikatsu Tsuboi + Kawaguchi & Engineers. Measuring 75.6 m in width and 108 m in length, it was 30 m high and supported by only six lattice columns.

Seventy-seven countries participated in the event, and within six months the number of visitors reached 64,218,770, making Expo '70 one of the largest and best attended expositions in history. It held the record for most visitors at an Expo until it was surpassed by the Shanghai World Expo in 2010. It generated a profit of 19 billion Yen.

== Major pavilions ==
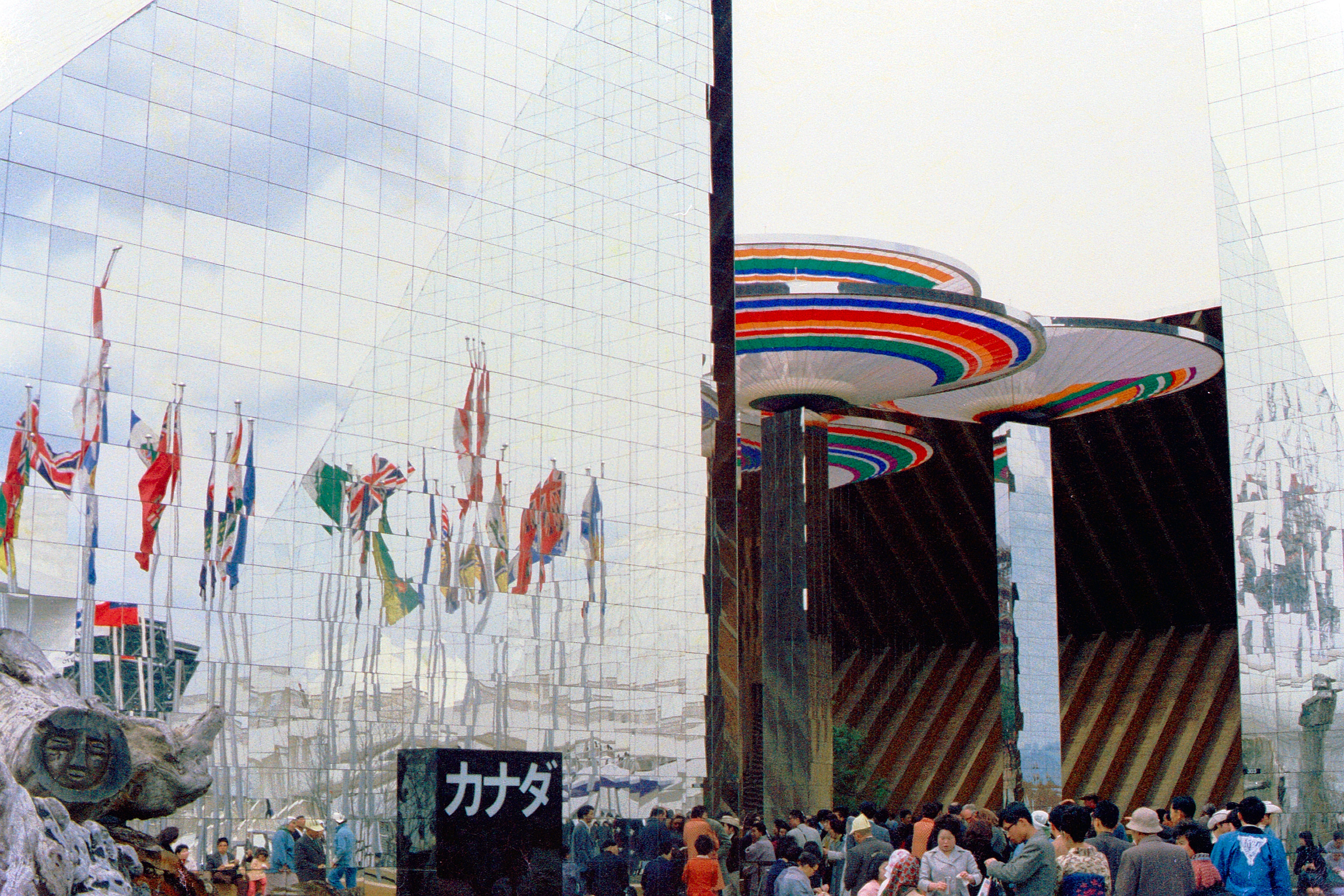
Canadian pavilion

- The Canadian pavilion, designed by architect Arthur Erickson, featured two National Film Board of Canada productions: The Land, a look at Canada from coast to coast, filmed for the most part from a low-flying aircraft, as well as the animated short The City, directed by Kaj Pindal. Montreal artist and architect Melvin Charney had submitted a radically different design for the Canadian pavilion, fashioned from construction cranes and scaffolding, which was rejected.

The Korean (left-center, in the distance) and West German (foreground) pavilions (far background: Tower of the Sun)

- The West German pavilion, designed by Fritz Bornemann, featured the world's first spherical concert hall, based on artistic concepts by Karlheinz Stockhausen. The pavilion theme was "gardens of music", in keeping with which Bornemann "planted" the exhibition halls beneath a broad lawn, with the connected auditorium "sprouting" above ground. Inside, the audience was surrounded by 50 loudspeaker groups in seven rings at different "latitudes" around the interior walls of the sphere. Sound was sent around the space in three dimensions using either a spherical controller designed by Fritz Winckel of the Electronic Music Studio at Technische Universität Berlin, or a ten-channel "rotation mill" constructed to Stockhausen's design. Works by Johann Sebastian Bach, Ludwig van Beethoven, Bernd Alois Zimmermann, and Boris Blacher were played from multi-track tape. As the main feature, however, Stockhausen was invited to present five-and-a-half-hour live programs of his music every day over a period of 183 days to a total audience of about a million listeners. In the course of the exhibition, 19 performers in Stockhausen's ensemble gave concerts for over a million visitors. "Many visitors felt the spherical auditorium to be an oasis of calm amidst the general hubbub, and after a while it became one of the main attractions of Expo 1970".
- The USSR pavilion was the tallest in the fairgrounds, a sweeping red and white design by Soviet architect Mikhail V. Posokhin.
- The U.S. pavilion was an air-supported dome, a joint design by architects Davis Brody and structural engineer David H. Geiger
- The Netherlands pavilion was the work of Carel Weeber and Jaap Bakema.
- The Hong Kong pavilion, topped by sails that were raised and lowered twice daily, was designed by Alan Fitch, W. Szebo & Partners.
- The Philippine Pavilion was designed by renowned Filipino Architect Leandro Locsin and was very well received and was judged as one of the ten most popular pavilions at the exhibition with its dramatic roof sweeping up from the ground using fine Philippine hardwoods and other native materials.

== Other attractions ==
A popular highlight of the fair was a large Moon rock on display in the United States' pavilion. It had been brought back from the Moon by Apollo 12 astronauts in 1969.

Expo '70 also saw the premiere of the first-ever IMAX film: the Canadian-produced Tiger Child for the Fuji Group pavilion.

The Expo also featured demonstrations of conveyor belt sushi, early mobile phones, local area networking and maglev train technology.

== After the fair ==
=== Today ===
The site of Expo '70 is now Expo Commemoration Park. Almost all pavilions have been demolished, but a few memorials remain, including part of the roof for Festival Plaza designed by Tange. The most famous of the still-intact pieces is the Tower of the Sun. The former international art museum pavilion designed by Kiyoshi Kawasaki was used as the building for the National Museum of Art, Osaka until March 2004 (the museum moved to downtown Osaka in November 2004).

Additionally, there is a time capsule that is to be left for 5,000 years and opened in the year 6970. The capsule was donated by The Mainichi Newspapers Co. and the Matsushita Electric Industrial Co. The concept creating time capsules at world's fairs started with the two Westinghouse Time Capsules, which are to be opened in 6939.

Part of the Expo Commemoration Park is now ExpoCity, a shopping mall that features the Redhorse Osaka Wheel.

Osaka successfully bid for Expo 2025 alongside Yekaterinburg, Russia, and Baku, Azerbaijan. However, the world's fair did not reuse the park space, and was instead hosted on Yumeshima island in Konohana, on the waterfront of Osaka Bay.

=== 50th anniversary ===
To celebrate the 50th anniversary, "Expo '70 50th Anniversary Special Exhibition" was held in Tennozu area of Tokyo from February 15 to 24, 2020.

Osaka Monorail operated a wrapping train that reproduced the monorail design that operated at the Expo to commemorate the anniversary.

== In popular culture ==
Expo '70 appears in Shōwa nostalgia fiction, where it is used as a symbol of the financial prosperity of Shōwa era Japan. For example, Expo '70 plays a central role in the plot of the Naoki Urasawa's manga 20th Century Boys; and various Expo '70 pastiches are featured in Crayon Shin-chan: The Storm Called: The Adult Empire Strikes Back.

- Expo '70 is the setting for the Daiei Motion Picture Company production of Noriaki Yuasa's Gamera vs. Jiger (1970), which was extensively filmed on location at the Expo grounds. The final battle between the monsters takes place at the Expo site. The film was marketed overseas as Monsters Invade Expo '70.
- Expo '70 is the setting for film Tracing to Expo '70 (1970)
- Kamen Rider episode 7 was filmed on the fairgrounds of Expo '70.
- Director Douglas Trumbull stated that the design of the space freighter Valley Forge in the 1971 science fiction drama Silent Running was inspired by the Expo Landmark Tower.
- Expo '70 is the main setting for the Canadian director Robert Lepage's 1998 film entitled Nô, based on his play The Seven Branches of the River Ota.
- Expo '70 is the climax setting for the Tamil film Ulagam Sutrum Valiban directed by M. G. Ramachandran.
- Expo '70 is an experimental psychedelic drone musical act from Kansas City, Missouri led by Justin Wright (2003–present).
- Expo '70 is referenced in Yasuo Ohtagaki's manga Moonlight Mile, as the protagonist Gorou comes from Suita.
- Expo '70 is referenced in the 2012 novel Miracles of the Namiya General Store by Keigo Higashino.

== See also ==
- List of world's fairs
- Osaka Expo '70 Stadium
- Expo Commemoration Park
- Expoland
- Expo '90
- Expo 2025
- 1970 Tenroku gas explosion
