= 108: Kaiba Gorō no Fukushū to Bōken =

2019 Japanese film

- Directed by: Suzuki Matsuo
- Written by: Suzuki Matsuo
- Based on: 108 by Suzuki Matsuo
- Produced by: Makiko Nagasaka; Ryū Nagai; Yūsuke Wakabayashi
- Starring: Suzuki Matsuo; Miho Nakayama
- Cinematography: Hironori Yamazaki
- Edited by: Sōichi Ueno
- Music by: Takashi Watanabe
- Distributed by: Phantom Film
- Release date: October 25, 2019
- Running time: 102 minutes
- Country: Japan
- Language: Japanese

108: Kaiba Gorō no Fukushū to Bōken (Japanese: 108〜海馬五郎の復讐と冒険〜, Hepburn: Ichi Maru Hachi ~Kaiba Gorō no Fukushū to Bōken~; lit. 108: Revenge and Adventure of Gorō Kaiba) is a 2019 Japanese dark comedy film written, directed by, and starring Suzuki Matsuo, based on his 2018 novel 108. The film also stars Miho Nakayama, Shunsuke Daitō, Shori Doi, Louis Kurihara, and LiLiCo.

== Synopsis ==
Screenwriter Gorō Kaiba discovers a Facebook post revealing that his wife, former actress Ayako, is having an extramarital affair. Furthermore, he notices that the post has 108 likes. Gorō can easily divorce Ayako, but he would end up paying her half of his assets, which total an estimated 10 million yen. Instead, he uses that money on a one-month womanizing streak, aiming to have sex with 108 women.

== Cast ==
- Suzuki Matsuo as Gorō Kaiba
- Miho Nakayama as Ayako Kaiba
- Shunsuke Daitō as Seiya
- Shori Doi as Azusa
- Louis Kurihara as Michio
- LiLiCo as Adrianne
- Seizō Fukumoto
- Naoki Inui as Doctor Snake
- Miwako Shishido as Sumire Horikiri
- Mayu Hotta as Mizuki Arai
- Seminosuke Murasugi
- Shūji Okui
- Hideto Iwai as Itoi
- Wakana Sakai
- Maki Sakai as Mari Kaiba
- Natsuko Akiyama as Mitsuko Sunayama

== Music ==
Gen Hoshino wrote and recorded the theme song "Yoru no Boat" (夜のボート, Yoru no Bōto; "Boat at Night").

== Release ==
The film was released in Japan by on October 25, 2019.
