= Otakus in Love =

Japanese manga series

- DVD cover

恋の門 (Koi no Mon)
- Manga
- Written by: Jun Hanyunyū
- Published by: Enterbrain
- Magazine: Comic Beam
- Original run: 1998 – 2001
- Live-action film
- Directed by: Suzuki Matsuo
- Released: October 9, 2004

Otakus in Love (Japanese: 恋の門, Hepburn: Koi no Mon) is a Japanese manga series written and illustrated by Jun Hanyunyū. It was adapted into a live action film directed by Hideaki Anno and Suzuki Matsuo in 2004.

== Cast ==
- Ryuhei Matsuda as Mon Aoki
- Wakana Sakai as Koino Akashi
- Suzuki Matsuo as Marimoda
- Kiyoshirô Imawano
- Hijiri Kojima as Mejina
- Shinya Tsukamoto as Noro
- Hideaki Anno
- Moyoco Anno
