= A Riot of Goldfish =

1937 short story by Okamoto Kanoko

A Riot of Goldfish (金魚撩乱, Kingyo ryōran; lit. 'A profusion of goldfish') is a short story written by Japanese author Okamoto Kanoko in 1937.

== Background ==
Okamoto Kanoko (岡本かの子; 1889–1939) wrote A Riot of Goldfish in 1937. Okamoto was a Buddhist scholar, an aesthete, and a feminist, all of which influences appear in the text. She was an active member of the feminist group Bluestockings (青踏社, Seitōsha). Also common in her work is water-related imagery, sensual descriptions of female beauty, the rejection of traditional female roles, an embellished prose style, and a unique use of language. The protagonist in A Riot of Goldfish, Mataichi, attempts in vain to create the perfect goldfish. This obsession with artistry is also seen in Okamoto's The Food Demon, in which the protagonist Besshiro strives to create the perfect culinary dish. Goldfish breeding is still an art practiced in Japan. Specialty goldfish mentioned in the text include the ranchū, ryūkin, and shūkin. Okamoto utilizes the natural landscape of eastern Tokyo and the Kansai region to create stunning imagery.

== Summary ==
The short story, set in early 20th-century Japan, follows the life of Mataichi, the adoptive son of a goldfish shop owner. The story begins in media res, with Mataichi reflecting upon his life and his obsession with Masako.

As children, Mataichi often teased and tormented Masako, driving her to the point of tears. Eventually, Masako fights back and throws a fistful of petals into Mataichi's face. After the fight, Mataichi changes his attitude towards Masako and falls in love with her.

After graduating high school, Mataichi becomes a research student at a fisheries station in the Kansai region, with an emphasis on domesticated fish. When Mataichi leaves Tokyo, he feels conflicting feelings of love and resentment towards Masako. Mataichi becomes involved with Yoshie, the daughter of a fishing family. He flaunts his relationship with Yoshie in his letters to Masako and compares the two women.

When Masako finally responds to his letters, she confesses that she is pregnant and engaged to be married soon. Mataichi becomes devastated by the news. After completing his field study, Mataichi focuses his entire energy on creating the perfect goldfish to mimic Masako's beauty. He spends over a decade on his attempt to produce a goldfish unrivaled in beauty. Finally, dispirited by his failures, Mataichi ventures to the pond where he keeps his unwanted, culled goldfish. The story ends with Mataichi's discovery of the ultimate goldfish in the muddy pond.

== Characters ==
Mataichi is the protagonist of the story. His adoptive family owns a goldfish shop, which sparks his initial interest in fishery. Mataichi studies domesticated fishery in school. He becomes driven by the desire to create the perfect goldfish. Mataichi falls in love with Masako, a childhood friend.

Masako is Mataichi's primary love interest. Known as the ‘young Miss from the big house on the cliff’ (4). Masako is somewhat shy and inconspicuous as a girl. She grows into a beautiful lady. When Masako becomes pregnant she marries the father and starts a small family.

Sōjurō is Mataichi's adoptive father. He owns a goldfish shop and considers himself a so-called “specialist in goldfish” but lacks the skills to raise fancy varieties aside from the hibuna goldfish. He often compares Masako to a ranchū goldfish because of her slow and exaggerated movements. Sōjurō eventually closes shop and teaches ogiebushi singing instead.

Otsune is Mataichi's adoptive mother. She encourages Mataichi to find a wife and settle down.

Teizō is Masako's father. He is described as scrawny and dark complexioned. A rich man, Teizō lost his wife when Masako was young. Teizō keeps a mistress in a separate house. Teizō is a great lover of goldfish and one of Sōjurō's best customers. During the financial crisis in Japan, Teizō loses most of his wealth and decides to pour his remaining resources into breeding and selling goldfish. He becomes Mataichi's patron.

Yoshie is a woman who was briefly involved with Mataichi. Mataichi flaunts his relationship with Yoshie in front of Masako and often compares the two: “[Yoshie] is not as beautiful as [Masako], but she’s not as icy as [Masako is] either”(28).

== Major themes ==
=== Buddhism ===
The author Okamoto Kanoko is a Buddhist scholar, which is reflected in her short story. The protagonist Mataichi is a secular man consumed by his desire for the beautiful girl Masako and driven by his ambitions to breed elaborative goldfish. He is not in the slightest a practitioner of Buddhism, which emphasizes emptiness and the need to break away from all worldly desires. The removal of all desire includes attachments to living beings: “The Dharma knows nothing of living beings, because it is removed from the defilement of such concepts as ‘living beings'(38). Buddhism advocates detachment from other humans, including parents, friends, and family. However, Mataichi possesses a maniacal desire for Masako. He even attempts to breed a goldfish unparalleled in beauty to recreate Masako’s loveliness. Driven mad by his desires and ambitions, Mataichi ruins his reputation, his livelihood, and his life.

At the end of the story, Mataichi experiences a change of heart: “Having once fainted from shock and then recovered, Mataichi had entered a clear-headed trance. He remembered nothing and thought of nothing, but beheld the beauty of nature as it was, transforming into ecstasy itself” (52). Here is when the author's Buddhist influences become apparent. Mataichi's trance is amazingly similar to meditation, a common Buddhist practice to empty the mind and enter a state of complete tranquility. As Mataichi meditates and reflects upon his life, “Mataichi’s desire was gradually overcome, sucked out of him and scattered by sheer fascination” (53). Mataichi frees himself and makes spiritual progress when he abandons his worldly desires. By the end of the story, Mataichi becomes free of his existential suffering and is at peace with the world.

=== Obsessions ===
Another central theme of the short story is obsession. Mataichi is driven by his obsessions: his obsession for the beautiful girl Masako and his obsession to create the perfect goldfish. These obsessions nearly drive Mataichi to ruin; by the end of the story, Mataichi appears older than his years. “He was not yet thirty, but his body and mannerisms were those of someone already ravaged by age.”

=== Human manipulation of nature ===
Throughout the story, Mataichi attempts to create the perfect goldfish by genetically engineering goldfish and breeding different varieties of goldfish together. He is unsuccessful in his attempts of human manipulation of nature and the resulting goldfish are tossed into a small pond. Eventually, Mataichi visits the small pond to discover that nature has created what humans could not: the ideal goldfish.

== Main scenes and events ==
Pivotal childhood encounter: After numerous encounters with Mataichi's incessant teasing, Masako finally retaliates. To Mataichi, the girl who lives on the hill has started to bloom into a woman.

Sponsorship: Teizō sponsors Mataichi's secondary vocational education at a school in the Kansai region. At school, Mataichi is praised as an artist and he remains away from home for four years.

Correspondence between Tokyo and Kansai: Masako writes to Mataichi that she is pregnant and set to marry a man that Mataichi has never met. In the same letter she mentions that she is more interested in the goldfish he will create than her future child. Soon after, Teizō informs Mataichi that he is experiencing financial hardship and prefers that Mataichi stop treating his work scholarly and instead focus of the goldfish enterprise. Mataichi becomes more determined to succeed in creating the perfect goldfish. He knows that he and Masako will never be together.

Return to Tokyo: Teizō calls Mataichi back to Tokyo due to financial hardship and Mataichi does not complete his degree. He returns to his decrepit fishponds, which were damaged in the Great Kanto earthquake. Without Masako in his life, he devotes himself entirely to goldfish. Change: Teizō dies and his son takes over the business. Due to the business' financial hardship, less money is give to Mataichi as he becomes more and more obsessed with creating the perfect goldfish.

Heavy rains: Rainstorms wash away the fishponds leaving everything behind in disarray. The water sweeps Mataichi down the hill to the pond designated for rejected experiments. Muck and debris left behind by the storm float in the pond.

Ending: In contrast to the beginning of the novel, which highlights Mataichi's repeated failures in goldfish breeding, Mataichi finds the one fish that he had desired to create for over ten years swimming amongst the sludge. Mirroring the beginning, he finds himself in a reclining position on the mud, but now he is overwhelmed by a sense of peace.

== Available translations ==
J. Keith Vincent, a professor of Japanese and comparative literature at Boston University, translated the novel into English. It was first published by Kodansha International in 2004 in the book Kingyo: The Artistry of Japanese Goldfish. In 2010, Hesperus Press published this translation along with one of The Food Demon (Shokuma) by Okamoto. In 2022 Anna Wołcyrz translated it to Polish.
