= Irving (talent agency) =

Japanese talent and advertising agency

Irving Co., Ltd
- Native name: 株式会社アービング
- Company type: Kabushiki gaisha (Joint-stock company)
- Industry: Service industry (entertainment)
- Genre: Tarento, entertainment industry management, advertising agency
- Founded: April 1997
- Headquarters: Kita Otemachi Building 4th Floor, Uchi-Kanda 1-7-16, Chiyoda, Tokyo, Japan; ZIP 101-0047
- Area served: Japan
- Key people: Yu Hagino (Representative director)
- Website: irving.co.jp

Irving Co., Ltd (株式会社アービング) is a Japanese talent agency and advertising agency headquartered in Uchi-Kanda, Chiyoda, Tokyo. It was found in 1997 under Aoyama Mainland, a real estate development group, and focuses on talent management for actors, Japanese idols, fashion models and tarento.

The company headquarters changed locations several times, originating in Roppongi to currently stationed in Chiyoda.

== Notable talents ==
=== Oversea talents ===
Representing agency in Japan only

- Block B
- Fly to the Sky
- Myname
- Ryu Si-won
- Sung Si-kyung

=== Idols/models/tarento ===
- Manami Hashimoto
- Haruka Katayama (former AKB48)
- Mariya Nagao (former AKB48)
- Ruy Ramos (former Japan national football team player)
- Wakana Sakai

== Former notable talents ==
- Chisato Amate
- Takako Inoue
- Jung Woo-sung
- Shinobu Kandori
- Hiromitsu Kanehara
- Kazutomo Miyamoto
- Hitomi Nishina
- Park Hyun-bin
- Kwon Sang-woo
- Seo In-guk
- Super Beaver
- Haruna Yabuki
- Jurina Matsui (former SKE48)
