= Okamoto Ippei =

Japanese illustrator, cartoonist, and writer

- 岡本一平
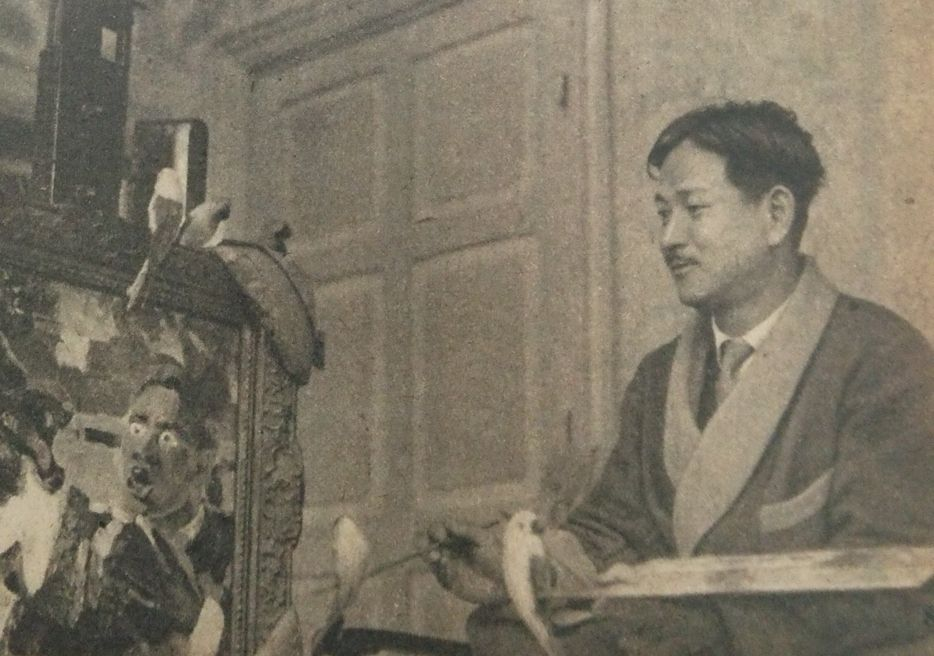
- Born: June 11, 1886; Hakodate, Hokkaido, Japan
- Died: November 11, 1948 (aged 62)
- Occupations: Mangaka, writer
- Spouse: Okamoto Kanoko

Okamoto Ippei (岡本 一平) (June 11, 1886 – October 11, 1948) was a Japanese illustrator, cartoonist, and writer.

== Biography ==
Okamoto Ippei was the second son of the Confucian scholar Katei Okamoto. He studied Western-style painting at Tokyo School of the Arts under the instruction of Japanese painter Fujishima Takeji. He started working as a scenery painter for Teikoku Theater in 1910. After getting married, he set up in Kyobashi with his family.

Okamoto traveled to Europe and the United States and brought to Japan several comics. In 1912, he started to draw manga for the newspaper Asahi Shinbun.

During the World War II, he moved to Hamamatsu and Gifu. He opened a school called Ippei Juku, where he was teacher of cartoonists Hidezo Kondo and Yukio Matsuura.

== Style ==
‘Cafe and Flapper (1927)’ by Ippei, featured at the Honolulu Museum of Art.

Okamoto became popular as a manga artist in the Taisho era due to his style that combined manga with refined writing. He included features of film in his comics. Manga artist Osamu Tezuka mentioned Okamoto as one of his main influences.

== Personal life ==
Okamoto Ippei met Kanoko Okamoto (then Ōnuki) when she sent him a poem that fed his interest. They met in the fall of 1909. In 1910, he married Kanoko Okamoto. In 1911, they had a son, the artist Tarō Okamoto (d.1996). He used to train younger drawers and after retiring, he helped his wife in her work as a novelist.
