= Punks Triangle =

Japanese manga series

- Cover of vol. 1 of the Japanese version, first released on July 25, 2023
- Genre: Boys' love, romance
- Manga
- Written by: Yuho Okita
- Published by: Tokyo Mangasha (2021); Homesha (2022–present)
- English publisher: NA: Seven Seas Entertainment
- Imprint: Eyes Comics
- Magazine: Nuude (2021); Dot Bloom (2022–present)
- Original run: May 21, 2021 – present
- Volumes: 2
- Television drama
- Directed by: Takehiro Shindō
- Written by: Hiroko Kanasugi
- Music by: Kōji Endō
- Studio: Video Planning
- Licensed by: GagaOOLala
- Original network: Fuji TV; Fuji TV On Demand
- Original run: October 10, 2025 – November 28, 2025
- Episodes: 8
- icon

Punks Triangle (stylized as PUNKS△TRIANGLE) is a Japanese manga series by Yuho Okita. It was first serialized in the bimonthly boys' love digital manga magazine Nuude from May 21, 2021, to July 16, 2021. Initially published by Tokyo Mangasha, it was later transferred to Homesha's boys' love digital manga magazine, Dot Bloom, where it continues to be serialized since November 25, 2022. Originally released as a single-volume work, a sequel continuation titled Punks Triangle Stitch began serialization on September 25, 2024.

A live-action television drama adaptation was broadcast on Fuji TV (Note: The live-action drama adaptation was broadcast on Fuji TV stations in the Kantō region only.) from October 10, 2025, to November 28, 2025.

== Plot ==
Since watching a fashion show featuring the punk fashion model Ai when he was a high school student, Chiaki Sumiura dreams of becoming a fashion designer and having Ai wear his clothes on the runway. At fashion college, Chiaki's class is given a project to design an outfit, in which Ai will choose one of them to model at his next fashion show. Chiaki is motivated but feels reluctant when he is partnered with the clumsy Enaga. However, unbeknownst to Chiaki, Enaga is Ai.

As the two work on their project, Chiaki begins to encounter Ai, who introduces him to the nightlife, and he falls in love with him as gets to know him on a personal level. At the same time, Chiaki becomes fond of Enaga. Enaga also falls in love with Chiaki, but he is reluctant to reveal the truth after learning Chiaki hates people who hide secrets.

== Characters ==
Chiaki Sumiura (純浦 千明, Sumiura Chiaki)
Portrayed by: Ryota Nagano (TV drama)
Chiaki is a fashion college student who idolizes the model Ai. He is described as "pure-hearted" and a "tsundere". He faces a childhood trauma where his mother had left his family, and because of this, he dislikes people who lie.
Ayumu Enaga (江永 歩, Enaga Ayumu)
Portrayed by: Yasunari Fujibayashi (TV drama)
Enaga is Chiaki's classmate and becomes his partner for their class project. Unbeknownst to Chiaki, he is a punk fashion model who models under the name Ai (アイ). As they become closer, Enaga becomes reluctant to reveal his secret, as Chiaki had confided to him that he dislikes people who hide secrets.

== Media ==
=== Manga ===
Punks Triangle is written and illustrated by Yuho Okita. Okita stated that the idea for the manga was "created through character designs", in that she had thought that boys in punk fashion looked cute. She decided that a fashion school was the most appropriate setting for the setting because they wore punk fashion. Okita stated that she faced challenges with the patterns on drawing the clothing and depicting fashion sketches realistically.

Punks Triangle was serialized in the bimonthly boys' love digital manga magazine Nuude from vol. 12 released on May 21, 2021, to vol. 13 released on July 16, 2021. Punks Triangle then changed publishers, transferring from Tokyo Mangasha to Homesha. It was then serialized in the bimonthly boys' love digital manga magazine Dot Bloom from vol. 35 released on November 25, 2022, to vol. 38 released on May 25, 2023. After the series' initial end, Okita followed up with a sequel, titled Punks Triangle Stitch, in vol. 46 of Dot Bloom, released on September 25, 2024. Okita decided on continuing the series because she had wanted to draw the community around Chiaki and Enaga and depict what their lives would have looked like in the future. She described Stitch as being "different" from the original volume and that the sequel will show "new sides" to Chiaki and Enaga's relationship and new side characters to create a "pleasant friend group". The chapters were later released in two bound volumes by Homesha under the Eyes Comics imprint. Animate sold the first volume with a limited edition 4-page booklet upon its initial release.

On October 2, 2024, Seven Seas Entertainment announced they had licensed Punks Triangle for North American distribution in English. On October 29, 2025, they announced that they had also licensed the sequel series, Punks Triangle Stitch.

No.	Title	Original release date	English release date
1	Punks Triangle; PUNKS△TRIANGLE	July 25, 2023; 9784834265361	April 15, 2025; 9798893731644
2	Punks Triangle Stitch vol. 1 PUNKS△TRIANGLE stitch	June 25, 2025; 9784396785376	August 11, 2026; 9798898630904

=== Television drama ===
On March 31, 2025, director Takehiro Shindō posted a public casting call for extras for a shoot involving a fashion show in June. A live-action television drama adaptation of Punks Triangle was later announced on June 25, 2025. It was broadcast on Fuji TV from October 10, 2025, (Note: Fuji TV lists the premiere date as October 9, 2025, at 25:40, which is October 10, 2025, at 1:40 am. Subsequent broadcasts are listed on Thursdays at 25:15, which are Fridays at 1:15 am.) to November 28, 2025, with a total of 8 episodes. Fuji TV On Demand, the channel's online streaming service, is also releasing weekly episodes with uncut content. The series is directed by Takehiro Shindō, with Hiroko Kanasugi in charge of the script and Kōji Endō in charge of music. The drama adaptation is produced by NBCUniversal Entertainment Japan. The theme song is "Double Face" by Urashimasakatasen, of which the CD jacket illustration was also provided by Yuho Okita. It was streamed internationally outside of Japan and South Korea through GagaOOLala.

The series stars Genin wa Jibun ni Aru member Ryota Nagano as Chiaki Sumiura and Yasunari Fujibayashi as Ayumu Enaga / Ai. To prepare for their roles, Nagano and Fujibayashi began wearing punk fashion in their daily lives. Supporting cast members include Akiko Hinagata as Yoshie Nakano, Chiaki and Enaga's teacher; Louis Kurihara as Naoki Murase, the manager of a clothing store where Chiaki works part-time; Rinta as Chiaki's senior co-worker; Kiyosuke Nakamura as Shō Saeki, Ai's hair and make-up stylist; Mone Akitani, Masaki Himekomatsu, Yūha Ōkawa, and Gōshu Suzuki as Chiaki and Enaga's classmates.

==== Episodes ====
No.	Title	Directed by	Written by	Original release date
1	"I'll Teach You About the Nightlife"; Transliteration: "Yoasobi no Shikata, Oshiete Ageru" (Japanese: 夜遊びの仕方、教えてあげる)	Takehiro Shindō	Hiroko Kanasugi	October 10, 2025
The fashion school students are given a group project to design an outfit based on the theme "human connection", in which Ai will select one of the outfits to wear at his next fashion show. Having idolized Ai since high school, Chiaki is excited, however, he is partnered with Enaga, the clumsiest student in class. At home, Chiaki reminisces about how his admiration for Ai led him to become interested in punk fashion and decides to visit a nightclub that Ai had posted about on social media. Chiaki runs into Ai, who introduces him to the nightlife. They exchange contacts, and after returning home, it is revealed that Ai is Enaga.
2	"We Meet Even "Here""; Transliteration: ""Kocchi" demo Deau to wa" (Japanese: 【こっち】でも出会うとは)	Takehiro Shindō	Hiroko Kanasugi	October 17, 2025
Chiaki and Enaga design a punk outfit, but the teacher asks them to revise it. For inspiration, Chiaki leads Enaga to the nightclub, where a paintball t-shirt painting event is taking place. Enaga is intrigued at the difference between how Chiaki is around him and Ai, and he begins to feel attracted to him. At night, as Ai, he messages Chiaki about meeting.
3	"Someone Who Doesn't Hide Secrets"; Transliteration: "Kakushigoto, Shinai Hito" (Japanese: 隠し事、しない人)	Takehiro Shindō	Hiroko Kanasugi	October 24, 2025
Chiaki accepts Ai's invitation to a bar, and Ai shows him more of the nightlife, from dancing in the nightclubs to hiding out in the backrooms. Chiaki gets drunk, and Ai helps him throw up in the bathroom by sticking his finger in his mouth. Later, Ai asks Chiaki about what kind of people he likes, and Chiaki tells him that he likes people who doesn't hide secrets.
4	"My Bias is Ai"; Transliteration: "Ore no Oshi, Ai-kun nanda" (Japanese: オレの推し、アイくんなんだ)	Takehiro Shindō	Hiroko Kanasugi	October 31, 2025
Enaga realizes that he has fallen in love with Chiaki but cannot reveal his true identity to him. He becomes curious as to why Chiaki dislikes people who hide secrets. At class, Enaga suggests Chiaki model their outfit at the school fashion show, and they gain their teacher's approval to begin constructing the outfit after finalizing the punk design. The two are unable to finish their outfit before the school closes, so Chiaki invites Enaga to come visit him so that they can finish at his home. After seeing the memorabilia of Ai, Chiaki shares that Ai is his favorite model.
5	"The Smell of Perfume and Cigarettes"; Transliteration: "Kōsui to Tabako no Nioi" (Japanese: 香水とタバコのにおい)	Takehiro Shindō	Hiroko Kanasugi	November 7, 2025
While sharing about how he admires Ai and finishing their project, Chiaki admits to Enaga that he hates people who lie after his mom left his family when he was younger. Enaga becomes drawn to Chiaki after seeing a side of him that he would never show Ai. At bedtime, Chiaki admits that he met Ai in person but is worried that Ai is upset with him as he had never contacted him since. Enaga comforts him, leaving Chiaki flustered, while still conflicted about revealing the truth.
6	"Are You Ready? I'm Putting It In"; Transliteration: "Ii? Ireru yo" (Japanese: いい？―――入れるよ)	Takehiro Shindō	Hiroko Kanasugi	November 14, 2025
As Enaga becomes worried about hurting Chiaki, Chiaki sees him as Ai in town and follows him to a bar for a drink. After he accidentally spills a drink on Ai's shirt, he suggests they go to a hotel to get it cleaned. In the process, Chiaki discovers Ai has a navel piercing and has him pierce his own as a "memory" before they part.
7	"Enaga is Ai"; Transliteration: "Enaga wa, Ai da" (Japanese: 江永は、アイだ)	Takehiro Shindō	Hiroko Kanasugi	November 21, 2025
As the fashion show approaches, Chiaki becomes confused about his feelings for Enaga and Ai. By the time the fashion show takes place, Chiaki trips on the runway, ripping the outfit and injuring his foot. Enaga alters it with safety pins from their classmates and models the outfit in his stead. As Enaga walks down the runway, Chiaki is startled to realize that Enaga and Ai are the same person.
8	"Teach Me How to Kiss"; Transliteration: "Kisu no Shikata mo, Oshiete" (Japanese: キスの仕方も、教えて)	Takehiro Shindō	Hiroko Kanasugi	November 28, 2025
Chiaki recognizes Ai from his runway walk and feels betrayed that Enaga had lied to him. After Chiaki refuses to accept Enaga's apology, the two become distant. One day, Enaga gives Chiaki a ticket to his fashion show, where he will be modeling their outfit, to which Chiaki reluctantly attends. At the end of the show, Enaga gives a speech on how the outfit he and Chiaki made represented "human connection". When Chiaki leaves, Enaga pursues him and confesses that he is in love with him. Chiaki shares that he feels the same, and the two begin a relationship.

== Reception ==
The original Punks Triangle volume won the Chil Chil BL Awards 2024 in the Deep category. Three reviewers at Anime News Network praised Okita's artwork and the romance; however, they directed some criticisms towards the story being "tropey". On the other hand, an editorial at Animate reviewed the series favorably, describing the series as "stylish" and the portrayals of fashion school as realistic. Over 280,000 physical copies have been sold consecutively in Japan since 2025. By 2026, over 380,000 digital and physical copies have been sold consecutively in Japan.
