= Louis Kurihara =

Japanese fashion model, TV personality and actor

- 栗原 類
- Born: 6 December 1994 (age 31)
- Other name: Rui Kurihara
- Occupations: Model, TV personality, actor
- Years active: 2013–present
- Agent: Ever Green Entertainment
- Height: 1.77 m (5 ft 9 1/2 in)
- Website: ameblo.jp/louiskurihara-ege

Louis Kurihara (栗原 類, Kurihara Rui; born 6 December 1994) is a Japanese fashion model, TV personality, and actor represented by the Ever Green Entertainment agency. He appears on Japanese TV, playing on his "overly negative" character, and debuted as a film actor in the 2013 film Zekkyō Gakkyū.

== Early life ==
Louis Kurihara was born on 6 December 1994 to a Japanese mother and a British father.

== Career ==
On 1 July 2013, Kurihara left the Junes Acting & Modeling agency to work for Ever Green Entertainment and devote more time to his acting career.

== Filmography ==
=== Film ===
- Zekkyō Gakkyū (2013) as Akira Gotō
- Daily Lives of High School Boys (2013), as Saino
- Black Butler (2014)
- Boku wa Tomodachi ga Sukunai (2014)
- 108: Revenge and Adventure of Goro Kaiba (2019) as Michio
- Signal 100 (2020)
- Tonkatsu DJ Agetarō (2020) as Jōsuke Shirai
- Daughter of Lupin the Movie (2021)
- Prisoners of the Ghostland (2021)

=== TV ===
- Odoru Sanma Goten! (????)
- Osama no Brunch (????)
- Waratte Iitomo! (2012)
- Magical x Heroine MagiMajo Pures! (2018)
- Daughter of Lupin (2019–20)
- Punks Triangle (2025), Naoki Murase
- Brothers in Arms (2026), Sakakibara Yasumasa

=== Magazines ===
- Fineboys
- Men's Non-No
- Popeye
- Street Jack

=== TV commercials ===
- Aeon Laketown shopping mall
- JR Central
- Nisshin Cup Noodle

== Photobooks ==
- Kurihara, Louis (7 November 2012). Never Mind the Negativity. Fusosha Publishing. ISBN 978-4594067137.
