= LiLiCo =

Swedish-Japanese TV personality and film critic (born 1970)

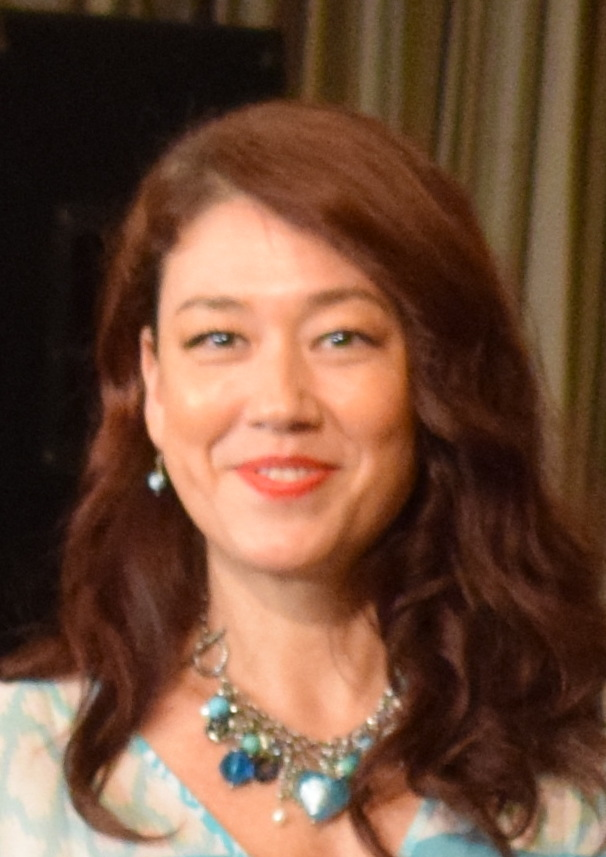
- LiLiCo, in 2018
- Born: Ann-Sophie Lennerfors; 16 November 1970 (age 55); Stockholm, Sweden
- Occupations: TV personality, actress, professional wrestler, film critic
- Years active: 1989-present
- Agent: Plan Chime
- Spouse: Ryohei Odai (m. 2018)

Ann-Sophie Lennerfors (born 16 November 1970) is a Swedish-Japanese TV personality, film critic and part-time professional wrestler who lives and works in Japan, best known under the stage name LiLiCo.

== Biography ==
=== Early life ===
LiLiCo was born Ann-Sophie Lennerfors in Stockholm, Sweden, to a Japanese mother and a Swedish father. As a biracial child in Sweden, LiLiCo was bullied while at school. Her father left the family when LiLiCo was 9 years old.

=== Career in Japan ===
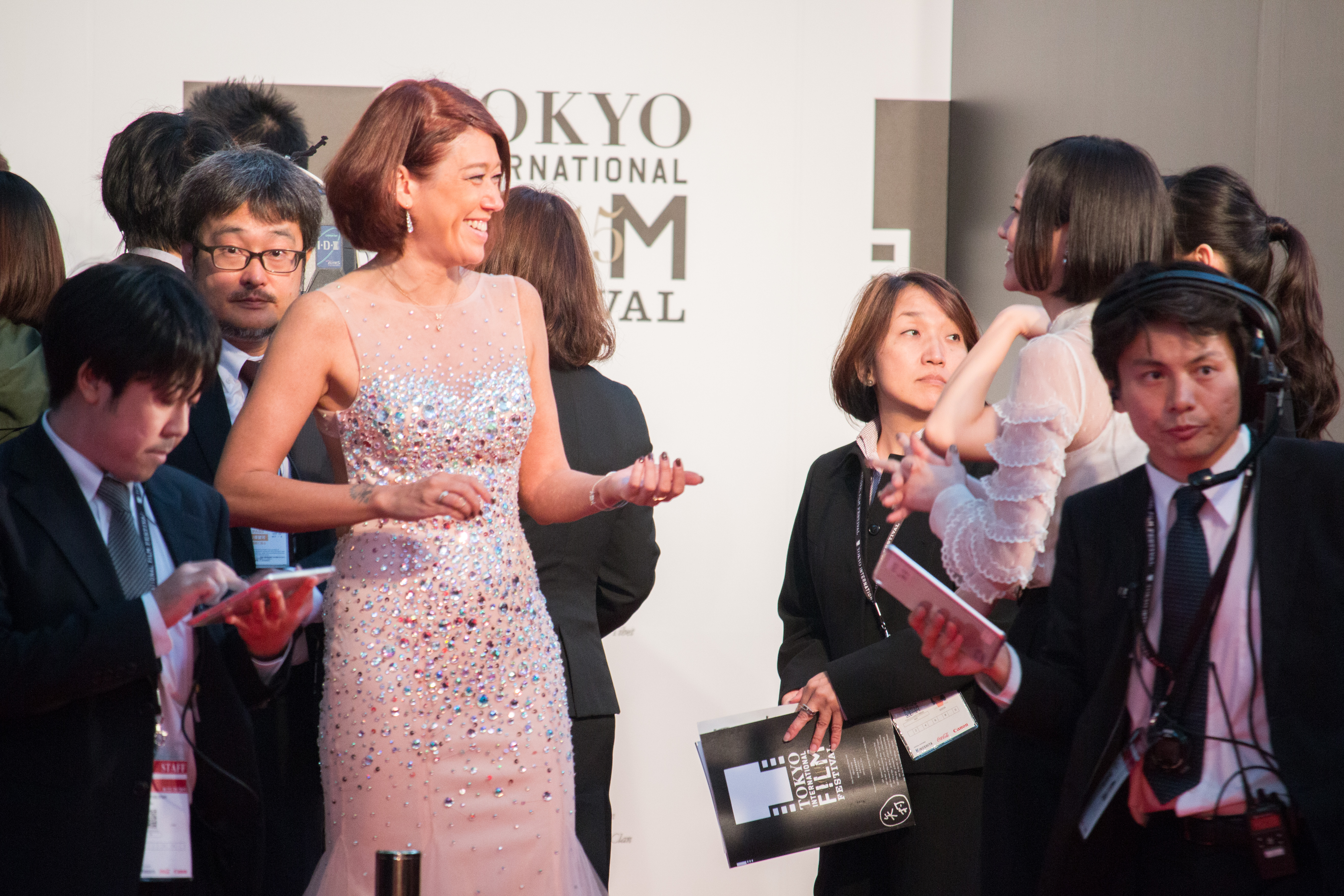
LiLiCo at 2015 Tokyo International Film Festival

LiLiCo moved to Japan in 1988 at the age of 18, initially staying with her grandmother in Katsushika, Tokyo. In May 1989, LiLiCo embarked on a career as a singer, releasing her first single in 1992. In 2001, she was offered a job as a film critic on TBS's Saturday morning King's Brunch programme.

=== Professional wrestling ===
In 2014, LiLiCo began working for Japanese professional wrestling company DDT Pro-Wrestling (DDT), where, over the next three years, she won the Ironman Heavymetalweight Championship twice and the DDT Extreme Championship once, while also becoming part of the inaugural KO-D 10-Man Tag Team Champions.

After having fractured her patella in 2020, forcing her to give up wrestling, LiLiCo was invited back to DDT to have a retirement match on March 20, 2022, at Judgement 2022: DDT 25th Anniversary.

== Filmography ==
=== Cinema ===
- Kiki's Delivery Service (2014), voice of radio DJ
- Smokin' on the Moon (2018)
- 108: Revenge and Adventure of Goro Kaiba (2019), Adrianne
- Niwatori Phoenix (2022)
- Let's Talk About the Old Times (2022), herself
- The Ohara Family Rhapsody (2024), Rikako
- 90 Years Old – So What? (2024)
- Goodbye, My Loved Ones! (2026), Rikako

=== TV drama ===
- Woman of Maruho (マルホの女) (2014, TV Tokyo), Ryoko Azuma

=== Dubbing ===
==== Live-action ====
- Barbie (Mermaid Barbie (Dua Lipa))
- Cirque du Freak: The Vampire's Assistant (Madame Truska (Salma Hayek))
- Wonka (The Countess (Sophie Winkleman))

==== Animation ====
- The Addams Family (Margaux Needler)
- The Lorax (Mrs. Wiggins)
- Mary and Max (Vera Lorraine Dinkle)
- South Park (Eric Cartman)
- A Turtle's Tale: Sammy's Adventures (Vera)

== Bibliography ==
- LiLiCo no Eiga-teki Seikatsu (LiLiCoの映画的生活; English translation: LiLiCo's Film-like Life) (2007, Goma Books), ISBN 978-4777107056
- I Love Sweden (2008, Goma Books), ISBN 978-4777111213
- Zarigani to Himawari (ザリガニとひまわり; English translation: Crayfish and Sunflowers) (2010, Kodansha), ISBN 978-4062165389

== Championships and accomplishments ==
- DDT Pro-Wrestling

- DDT Extreme Championship (1 time)
- Ironman Heavymetalweight Championship (2 times)
- KO-D 10-Man Tag Team Championship (1 time) – with Ken Ohka, Ladybeard, Makoto Oishi and Super Sasadango Machine
