= Akiko Hinagata =

Japanese actress and former gravure idol (born 1978)

- Born: January 27, 1978 (age 48); Tokyo, Japan
- Occupations: Actress, model
- Years active: 1992–present
- Known for: Television drama series
- Spouses: Kazuma Yamamoto (m. 1998; div. 2003) Kousei Amano (m. 2013)
- Children: 1

Akiko Hinagata (雛形あきこ, Hinagata Akiko; born January 27, 1978) is a Japanese actress and former gravure idol.

== Career ==
=== Television ===
She made her acting debut in 1992 in the TBS drama Obenkyō. In 1994, she was chosen Fuji Television Visual Queen. Two years later, Hinagata received the Golden Arrow Graph prize. In 1997 she was awarded a Special Prize at the 10th annual Japan Glasses Best Dressed Awards. She appeared on the Fuji TV program Iron Chef in 1999 as a judge in two battles. Hinagata has appeared in at least 25 television roles, including the Fuji Television production Ring.

=== Film ===
Hinagata had the assignment of playing herself in a voice role in Crayon Shin-chan: Great Adventure in Henderland. She also appeared in a Gokudō no Onna-tachi film, and in the 2004 Ghost Shout.

=== Radio ===
Additionally, she has hosted five radio programs. She regularly appears on television variety shows, and has acted on stage. In commercials, she has represented Nissin Foods' ramen and udon, Mitsubishi (now Nippon) Oil, Asahi Soft Drinks' Sawayaka Budō, Pola Cosmetics, and Japan Tobacco's Yamucha-rō beverages. She has released five photo books and published two collections of essays.

== Personal life ==
In May 1998, Hinagata married commercial director Kazuma Yamamoto. After she gave birth to her daughter on May 11, 2000, she was able to balance between work and parenting with the help of her fellow mothers. They divorced on November 28, 2003.

In 2013, she remarried actor Kousei Amano.

== Filmography ==
=== Films ===
- Crayon Shin-chan: Great Adventure in Henderland (1996), herself (voice)
- Akumu-chan (2014), Noriko Higuchi
- Nomitori Samurai (2018)

=== Television ===
- Akumu-chan (2012), Noriko Higuchi
- Hana Moyu (2014), Ikumatsu
- Punks Triangle (2025), Yoshie Nakano
