= Kanoko Okamoto =

Japanese author, tanka poet and Buddhist scholar

- 岡本 かの子
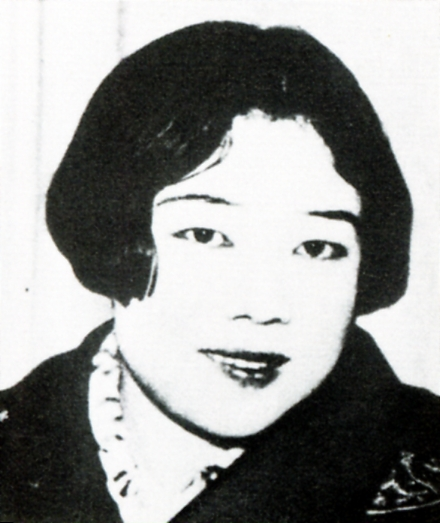
- Born: Kano Ōnuki (大貫 カノ); 1 March 1889; Tokyo, Japan
- Died: 18 February 1939 (aged 49); Yokosuka, Kanagawa, Japan
- Occupation: Writer
- Writing career
- Genres: Novels and poetry
- Notable work: Tsuru wa yamiki

Kanoko Okamoto (岡本 かの子, Okamoto Kanoko; 1 March 1889 – 18 February 1939) was the pen-name of Kano Ōnuki (大貫 カノ, Ōnuki Kano), a Japanese author, tanka poet, and Buddhist scholar active during the Taishō and early Shōwa periods.

== Early life ==
Kanoko's maiden name was Ōnuki Kano. She was born in Aoyama, Akasaka-ku (present day Minato, Tokyo), to an extremely wealthy family. Her father suffered from lung disease, and Kanoko was sent to the Ōnuki family estate in Futako Tamagawa, Kawasaki, Kanagawa, where she was raised by a governess. Her tutor encouraged her affinity for music, calligraphy and traditional dance, and introduced her to Japanese classical literature, especially the Tale of Genji and Kokin Wakashū.

== Literary career ==
Okamoto was influenced greatly by her older brother, Shosen, and his classmate Jun'ichirō Tanizaki who studied at the First Higher School and Tokyo Imperial University. While still a student at the Atami Gakuen girls' high school, Kanoko called on the poet, Yosano Akiko, and this encounter prompted her to start contributing tanka to the poetry magazine Myōjō ("Bright Star"). Along with Yosano, she joined Hiratsuka Raichō, Tamura Toshiko, and others, to be one of the initial contributors to the influential Bluestocking (Seitō) journal, helping to set the course for women writers and feminist ideas, in 1911. Later, she played an active part as a key contributor to another journal, Subaru ("Pleiades"). She published Karoki-netami, the first of her five tanka anthologies, in 1912.

Okamoto Kanoko is an authority on Buddhism, after she plunged into Buddhist practice and research during her marriage to the famous cartoonist Okamoto Ippei.

In 1908, she met cartoonist Okamoto Ippei while on a holiday in Karuizawa, Nagano, together with her father. However, her family was extremely opposed to the relationship, and she created a scandal by moving in together with him in 1910 without marrying. Their eldest son, the avant-garde painter Tarō Okamoto, was born the next year. However, Kanoko's family life was filled with tragedy. Soon after she moved in with Ippei, her brother and then her mother died. Her eldest daughter was born with mental health problems, and soon died. Her common-law husband was opposed to her independence, jealous of her artistic successes and was unfaithful. Her younger son was also born with weak health, and died in infancy.

These problems led Okamoto to turn to religion. She was first interested in Protestant Christianity, but did not find it to her liking. She then turned to the Jodo Shinshu sect of Buddhism, as expounded by Shinran, which was the start of her work as a researcher of Buddhism, about which she wrote numerous essays.

After releasing her fourth tanka anthology Waga saishū kashū ("My Last Anthology") in 1929, she decided to become a novelist. She took her whole family to Europe to complete her literary studies. They traveled to Paris, London, Berlin, and (leaving their son behind) toured around the United States, returning to Japan in 1932.

After returning home, Okamoto continued her researches into Buddhism, but also found time to a novelette called Tsuru wa yamiki ("The Dying Crane"), describing the last days of writer Ryūnosuke Akutagawa, while staying at an inn near Kamakura Station in the summer of 1923. Published in the magazine Bungakukai in 1936, it marked the start of her activity with prose fiction.

After that, she published many more works in quick succession, including Boshi jojō ("The Relationship between Mother and Child"), Kingyo ryōran ("A Riot of Goldfish"), and Rōgishō ("Portrait of an Old Geisha"). A recurring theme in her work is the effect of a person's familial ancestral karma on their present-day lives. While praising the richness of her use of language, some critics have felt that she tended towards excessive passion and unnecessary literary flourishes.

She died of a brain hemorrhage in 1939. She was 49 years old. Her grave is at the Tama Cemetery in Fuchu, Tokyo.

Because she did not begin writing actively until her later years, most of her works were published posthumously.

Kanoko Okamoto has always wanted to become a novelist, but only began publishing ‘secular’ fiction until the end of her life. Her reputation as a fiction writer was assured with the publication of her novella Boshi Jojo (A Mother’s Love). Boshi Jojo is published in 1937, and is a daring look at the erotic side of maternal feeling.

Okamoto Kanoko dedicated herself to presenting straightforward images of strong, mysterious, even shamanic female characters. The combination of power and female beauty is represented in many of her works including ‘A Mother’s Love,’ ‘A Riot of Goldfish,’ and ‘The Record of Old Geisha.’ Her works like ‘Kakoze’ also explore themes like homoerotic aestheticism and the female gaze.

== Selected works ==
- Tsuru wa yamiki (The Dying Crane) (1936)
- Manatsu no yoru no yume (A Midsummer Night's Dream) (1937)
- Boshi jojō (The Relationship between Mother and Child) (1937)
- Kingyo ryōran (A Riot of Goldfish) (1937)
- Rōgishō (Portrait of an Old Geisha) (1938)
- Kawa akari (Stream of Light) (1938)
- Marunouchi sōwa (Story of Inside the Grass Circle) (1939)
- Seisei ruten (Lively Ebb and Flow) (1940)
- Nyotai kaiken (The Opening of the Female Body) (1943)

=== English translations ===
- A Riot of Goldfish (Kingyo ryōran). Translated by J. Keith Vincent. London, Hesperus Press (2010). (Also includes "The Food Demon" [Shokuma])

=== Spanish translations ===
- Sushi y el cuentito zen del pescadero (Sushi / Totoya zentan).Translated by Victoria Chávez. Santiago, Inti ediciones (2026).

== See also ==
- Japanese literature
- List of Japanese authors
