= Uzō Nishiyama =

- 西山夘三 にしやま うぞう
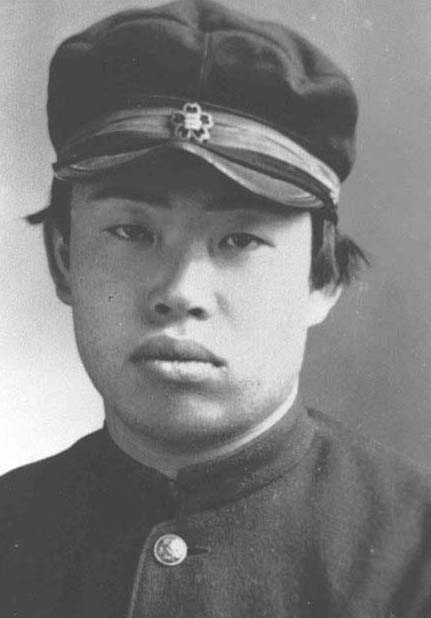
- Young Uzo Nishiyama
- Born: 1 March 1911; Osaka, Japan
- Died: 2 April 1994 (aged 83)
- Education: Kyoto Imperial University
- Occupation: Architect

Uzō Nishiyama (西山 夘三, Nishiyama Uzō; 1 March 1911 – 2 April 1994) was a Japanese modernist architect, city planner, and architectural scholar. He is noted for his application of methods of scientific research to the study of architecture and urban planning. Nishiyama served as a professor at Kyoto University for over 25 years, and produced a number of seminal writings on architectural theory.

The Uzo Nishiyama Memorial Library in Kyoto, which specializes in works relating to architecture and urban planning, is named after Nishiyama.
