= Tower of the Sun =

Building by Tarō Okamoto

Coordinates: 34°48′34.7″N 135°31′56.3″E

Exterior of the Tower of the Sun

The Tower of the Sun (太陽の塔, Taiyō no Tō) is an avant-garde sculpture and building created by Japanese artist Tarō Okamoto. It was known as the symbol of Expo '70 and is currently preserved and located in Expo '70 Commemorative Park in Suita, Osaka Prefecture, Japan. The tower has multiple faces on its front and back.

It was designated a Tangible Cultural Property of Japan in 2020.

== Design and history ==
A side view of the tower as seen from the Expo '70 Korean Pavilion, April 1970.

The tower was designed by Tarō Okamoto and built for Expo '70. It was located within the central Festival Plaza building known as "Big Roof", itself designed by Japanese architect Kenzo Tange. The tip of the tower projected out of a circular hole cut in Big Roof's ceiling due to its height. After the completion of the tower, Expo '70 organizer and science fiction writer Sakyo Komatsu said to Okamoto that it reminded him of a scene in the 1955 novel Season of the Sun where a character sticks his penis through a sliding paper door, and suggested the name "Tower of the Sun".

During the Expo, the tower was open to the public and visitors were able to enter inside. The interior featured escalators and elevators surrounding a 41-meter-tall artwork titled the "Tree of Life" (生命の樹 Seimei no Ki), representing the evolution of all creatures. Tsuburaya Productions produced figurines that featured in the artwork. One elevator led up to the ceiling of Big Roof, accessible through an open wall; this was closed after the Expo ended.

Two other artworks by Tarō Okamoto, "The Tower of Mother" and "The Tower of Youth", were originally placed in the east and west areas of the Expo park, and were later removed.

Big Roof was dismantled in 1979, causing the tower to be further exposed to the elements. Due to deterioration of the outside and abandonment of the inside, a proposal was made for demolition, resulting in efforts to instead preserve the sculpture; repair work began in November 1994 and lasted until March 1995.

On October 11 and 12, 2003, the inside of the Tower of the Sun was opened to a selected 1,970 people (due to the year the World Expo was hosted). The lottery process drew over 24,000 applicants, resulting in the Commemorative Organization for the Japan World Exposition '70 opening the tower again in November and December of the same year. These events and subsequent, similar openings of the tower, held at irregular intervals until October 2006, were attended by over 40,000 people. Due to significant repairs and renovation in preparation for the 40th anniversary event for Expo '70, held in 2010, access to the tower's interior was once again closed. The inside was scheduled to be re-opened to the public starting in 2014. After four years of delays, the tower was permanently reopened in March 2018, featuring earthquake reinforcement, a restored Tree of Life, and a reconstructed "Sun of the Underworld".

== Overview ==
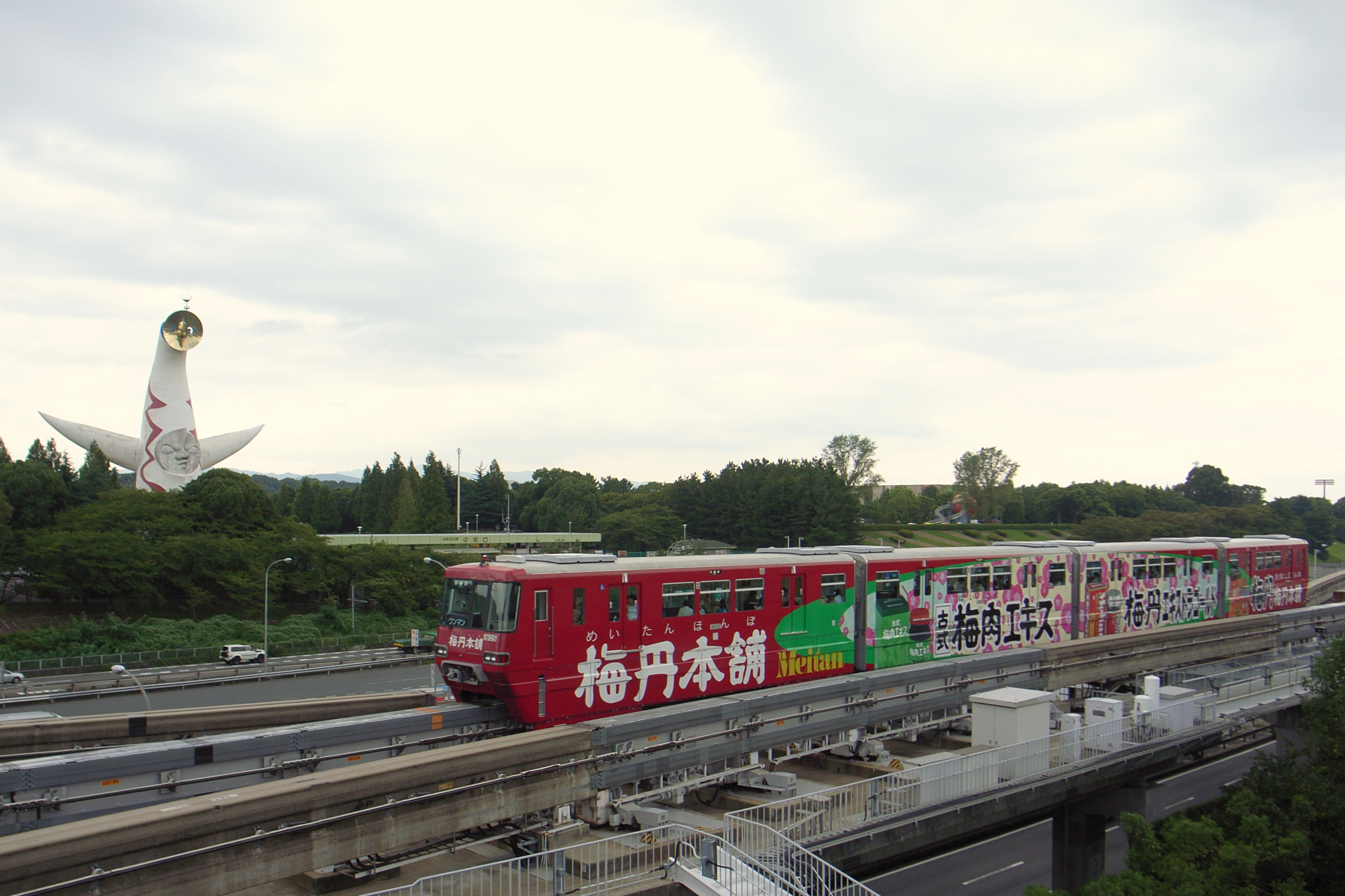
The Osaka Monorail runs in front of the Tower of the Sun and Expo '70 Commemorative Park.

The tower is approximately 70 meters tall, 20 meters wide at its base, and has two 25-meter-long arms. The tower currently has three faces:

- The "Golden Mask", located at the top, representing the future. It is 11 meters wide; the antenna protruding from its mouth works as a lightning rod.
- The "Face of the Sun", located on its front between the two arms, representing the present.
- The "Black Sun", on its back, representing the past. This face also symbolizes a sun that has been "scientifically analyzed by humans", and nuclear energy.

A fourth face, titled the "Underground Sun" or "Sun of the Underworld", was present during Expo '70 in a subterranean space titled "PRAYER". Rather than representing a temporal aspect, this face was said to express "the inner spiritual world of humans." When the Expo closed, the face "disappeared" and was moved to an unknown location. A reconstruction was created and has been exhibited since 2018, but the original sculpture has never been found.

The tower's outside was constructed using shotcrete and is bumpy, a style that was chosen in order to come across as a "natural texture" rather than an industrial surface.

Lights are installed in the eyes of the Golden Mask and are lit up at night. Xenon arc floodlights were originally used during Expo '70, but were later turned off due to electrical problems and concerns that they may disrupt aircraft operations at the nearby Osaka Itami Airport. On September 25, 2004, an external battery was connected and the lights were lit to advertise a countdown to Expo 2005. In 2010, the floodlights were replaced with 148 lower brightness LEDs.

The original Golden Mask was constructed from 337 steel plates. Due to deterioration from wind and rain, it was replaced with a second-generation stainless steel replica in 1992. Around half of the original plates that were mostly undamaged remain in storage within Expo '70 Commemorative Park.

The jagged red paintings on the front of the tower represent thunder.

Inside of the tower, a gigantic artwork called the "Tree of Life" is exhibited. Attached to the trunk and branches of the Tree are 292 different models of living organisms of various species and sizes. Large lit-up amoebas appear on the bottom while humans appear at the top, smallest.

A miniature version of the Tower of the Sun is located in the Taro Okamoto Museum of Art. The tower has also been listed as one of the Best 100 Media Arts in Japan by the Agency for Cultural Affairs.

== Interpretation ==
"Progress functions backwards. We are losing our real lives, the integrity of our lives, our bodies and physicality. I myself have deep doubts about progress. You say Apollo is progress. Progress to what?"

— Tarō Okamoto

Art historian Fumihiro Sunahara has said that the Tower was Okamoto's way of rebelling against or reinterpreting the theme of Expo '70, "Harmony and Progress for Mankind". Sunahara claims that Okamoto instead believed that mankind had not yet achieved either progress or harmony – or, had achieved these only on a superficial level – and thought that unchecked technological advancement and progress was naïve.

Akiomi Hirano, director of the Taro Okamoto Memorial Museum, believes that Okamoto and the Tower of the Sun completely opposed ideas such as "optimistic futurism" and "the cult of technology", and disagreed with the Expo's messaging that industrialization and technical progress were the best ways for humans to be happy.

According to art critic Noi Sawaragi, the Tower of the Sun is related to mushroom clouds, with the theme of atomic bombs also present in other of Okamoto's artworks such as the mural "Myth of Tomorrow", which was created concurrently with the Tower of the Sun.

== In popular culture ==
- The 1970 Japanese kaiju film, Gamera vs. Jiger, features Expo '70 prominently, including location shots, voice-over descriptions, and scale models. See also Warning from Space.
- The Tower of the Sun and Expo '70 play a central role in Naoki Urasawa's 1996–2006 manga 20th Century Boys. In the series, the tower becomes one of the main symbols of the "cult of the friend", an evil association that wants to conquer the world.
- In 1997, Naoko Yamano, guitarist and founding member of the Osaka-based pop/punk band Shonen Knife, wrote a song called "Tower of the Sun" which appears on the band's 1997 album Brand New Knife.
- The Tower of the Sun and other sculptures at Expo '70 feature prominently and served to inspire the 2001 animated film Crayon Shin-chan: The Storm Called: The Adult Empire Strikes Back.
- Tomihiko Morimi, author of The Tatami Galaxy, entitled his 2003 debut novel "Tower of the Sun". The edifice features prominently throughout the book.
- In 2007, the tower was briefly shown in the anime Moonlight Miles season 1 and 2.
- The Tower of the Sun (along with Okamoto's other works) was used as homage in the character of Deidara from the Naruto series, with an explosion caused by the character's suicidal attack "C0" taking the shape of the tower.
- According to Pokémon Black and White art director Ken Sugimori, the Pokémon Larvesta is partially inspired by the Tower of the Sun; specifically, the red growths surrounding Larvesta's head.
  - In Pokémon the Series: Diamond and Pearl, Sunyshore Tower resembles the Tower of the Sun.
- The Tower of the Sun shows up as a pilotable giant mecha in the 2010 Shingo Honda's manga Creature!, and is depicted on the cover of volume 18.
- The 2011 television drama series Taro's Tower is a memoir of Okamoto's life, and was titled after the tower.
- The Tower appears in Hirokazu Kore-eda's 2011 film I Wish.
- In 2014, Bandai created Tower of the Sun Robot (太陽の塔のロボ), a 288 mm chogokin toy replica of the Tower of the Sun that transforms into a giant robot. As part of ad campaign for the model, the tower is shown in a short animated sequence in which transforms and briefly fight a monster, in the style of tokusatsu programs.
- In 2022, Tarōman: Tarō Okamoto Style Special Effects Action Drama, a tokusatsu television drama featuring the titular superhero designed after Tower of the Sun and Tower of the Young Sun and was broadcast on NHK Educational TV. Its film adaptation Taroman Expo Explosion (大長編 タローマン 万博大爆発) was theatrically released during the Expo 2025.
