= Wakana Sakai =

Japanese actress and writer

- 酒井 若菜
- Born: Miyuki Sakai (former stage name); September 9, 1980 (age 45); Nogi, Shimotsuga District, Tochigi, Japan
- Occupations: Actress; writer
- Years active: July (Note: Debut month; Wakana Sakai's Twitter account. Jul 2014.) 1995–present
- Agents: Moon the Child (1995–2009); A-team (2009–2024); Irving (2024–)
- Known for: Kisarazu Cat's Eye; Single Mothers; Shūden Gohan; Otakus in Love; Kisarazu Cat's Eye World Series; Reunion
- Website: Official profile

Wakana Sakai (酒井 若菜, Sakai Wakana; born 9 September 1980, in Nogi, Shimotsuga District, Tochigi, Japan) is a Japanese actress, writer, and former gravure idol. Her real and former stage name is Miyuki Sakai (酒井 美幸, Sakai Miyuki).

Sakai is represented with Moon the Child, then A-team, and later Irving. She is left-handed.

== Filmography ==
=== TV drama ===
Year	Title	Role	Notes	Ref.
1997	Psychometrer Eiji			
2000	Ikebukuro West Gate Park	Rika		
2002	Kisarazu Cat's Eye	Moko		
2010	Ryōmaden	Otoku	Taiga dama	
2015	Atelier	Mizuki Nishikawa		
2016	Hi no Ko	Kyoko Ikemoto	Episodes 4 and 5	
2023	The Child of God Murmurs		Television film	
2024	Omusubi	Sachiko Yotsugi	Asadora	

=== Films ===
Year	Title	Role	Notes	Ref.
2022	Ano Niwa no Tobira o Aketatoki			
2023	Shylock's Children			
2026	Shadow Work	Shinobu		
2026	Mentor	Maiko Ikuta		

== Publications ==
=== Photobooks ===
Year	Title	Ref.
2013	I Love You	

=== Novels ===
Year	Title	Ref.
2008	Koboreru	

=== Essays ===
Year	Title	Ref.
2012	Kokoro ga Obotsukanai Yoru ni	
2016	Wakana Sakai to 8-ri no Otoko-tachi	

=== Articles ===
Year	Title	Notes	Ref.
2013	Wakana Sakai no "Kuyokuyo Shitatte Hajimaru!"		
