= Tarō Okamoto =

Japanese artist (1911–1996)

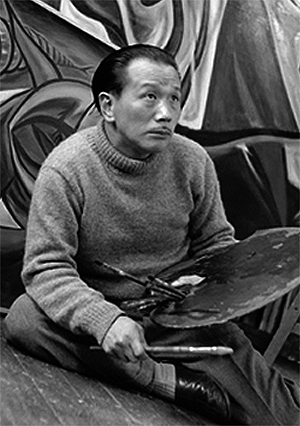
- Born: February 26, 1911; Takatsu village, Kawasaki, Kanagawa, Japan
- Died: January 7, 1996 (aged 84)
- Known for: Painting, murals, sculpture, art theory
- Movement: Avant-garde

Tarō Okamoto (岡本 太郎, Okamoto Tarō; February 26, 1911 – January 7, 1996) was a Japanese artist, art theorist, and writer. He is particularly well known for his paintings, public sculptures, and murals, his theorization of traditional Japanese culture, and his avant-garde artistic practices.

== Biography ==
=== Early life (1911–1929) ===
Tarō Okamoto was the son of cartoonist Okamoto Ippei and writer Okamoto Kanoko. He was born in Takatsu, in Kawasaki, Kanagawa Prefecture.

In 1927, at the age of sixteen, Okamoto began to take lessons in oil painting from the artist Wada Eisaku. In 1929, Okamoto entered the Tokyo School of Fine Arts (today Tokyo University of the Arts) in the oil painting department.

=== Time in Europe (1929–1940) ===
In 1929, Okamoto and his family accompanied his father on a trip to Europe to cover the London Naval Treaty of 1930. While in Europe, Okamoto spent time in the Netherlands, Belgium, and Paris, where he rented a studio in Montparnasse and enrolled in a lycée in Choisy-le-Roi. After his parents returned to Japan in 1932, he stayed on in Paris until 1940.

Much of Okamoto's formative education occurred during his stay in Paris. In 1932, he began attending classes at the Sorbonne, and enrolled in the literature department where he studied philosophy and specialized in aesthetics. He attended lectures on Hegelian aesthetics by Victor Basch. In 1938, Okamoto, along with many other Parisian artists at the time, began studying ethnography under Marcel Mauss, and he would later apply this ethnographic lens to his analysis Japanese culture.

Okamoto also began to establish himself as a painter in Paris, working with the Parisian avant-garde artists. He was inspired by Pablo Picasso's Pitcher and Bowl of Fruit (1931) which he saw at the Paul Rosenberg Gallery, and in 1932 he began successfully submitting his own paintings for exhibition at the Salon des surindépendants, for which he received some positive reviews. From 1933 to 1936, he was a member of the group Abstraction-Création, and showed works in their exhibitions. He participated in the French intellectual discussion group Collège de Sociologie and joined the secret society founded by Georges Bataille, Acéphale. His painting Itamashiki ude ("Wounded Arm") was notably included in the International Surrealist Exhibition in Paris in 1938.

Okamoto met and befriended many prominent avant-garde art figures in Paris, including André Breton, Kurt Seligmann, Max Ernst, Pablo Picasso, Man Ray, Robert Capa and Capa's partner, Gerda Taro, who adopted Okamoto's first name as her last name.

=== Wartime (1940–1945) ===
Okamoto returned to Japan in 1940 because his mother had died, and because of the outbreak of World War II. He found some artistic success in Japan upon his return, winning the Nika Prize at the 28th Nika Art Exhibition in 1942. The same year, he also had a solo exhibition of works he had completed in Europe, at the Mitsukoshi department store in Ginza.

In 1942, Okamoto was drafted into the army as an artist tasked with documenting the war, and left for service in China. He returned to Japan in 1946 after spending several months in a prisoner-of-war camp in Chang'an. During his absence, his family home and all of his works were destroyed in an air raid.

=== Postwar activity (1946–1996) ===
==== 1946–1950 ====
After the war, Okamoto established a studio in Kaminoge, Setagaya, Tokyo. He became a member of the artist association Nika-kai ("Second Section" Society) in 1947 and began regularly showing works at the Nika Art Exhibition. He also began giving lectures on European modern art, and started publishing his own commentaries on modern art. In studies of postwar Surrealism in Japan, Okamoto has been described as an important conduit of information from Paris, where he had lived for over a decade. In 1948, he and the art critic Kiyoteru Hanada established the group Yoru no Kai ("Night Society"), whose members attempted to theorize artistic expression after the war. It dissolved in 1949. Hanada and Okamoto then founded the Abangyarudo Kenkyūkai ("Avant-Garde Research Group") which mentored younger artists and critics such as Tatsuo Ikeda, Katsuhiro Yamaguchi, and Yūsuke Nakahara. Eventually these groups inspired younger artists to break off and form their own avant-garde groups.

==== 1950–1969 ====
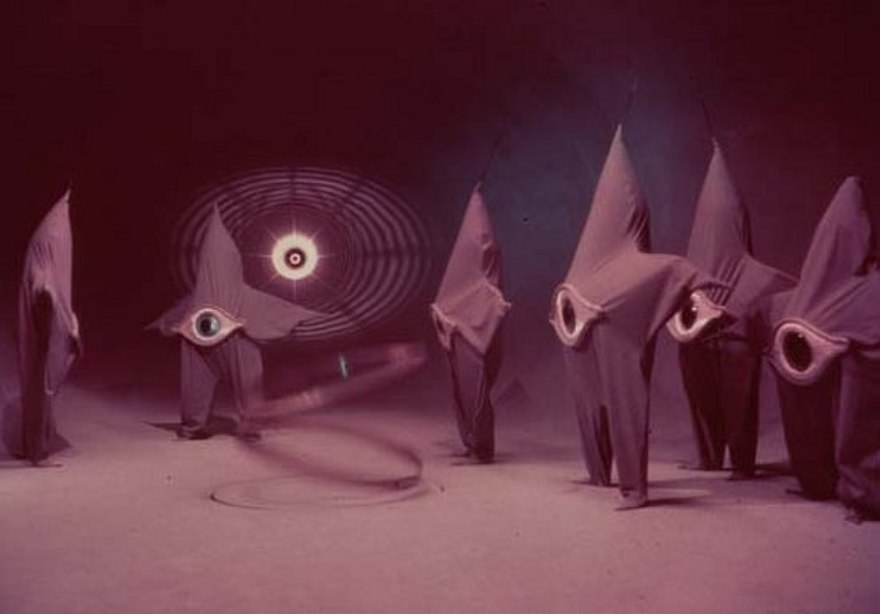
The alien "Pairan" from the 1956 film Warning from Space, designed by Tarō.

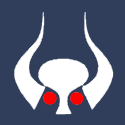
The insignia of Osaka Kintetsu Buffaloes, designed by Tarō in 1959.

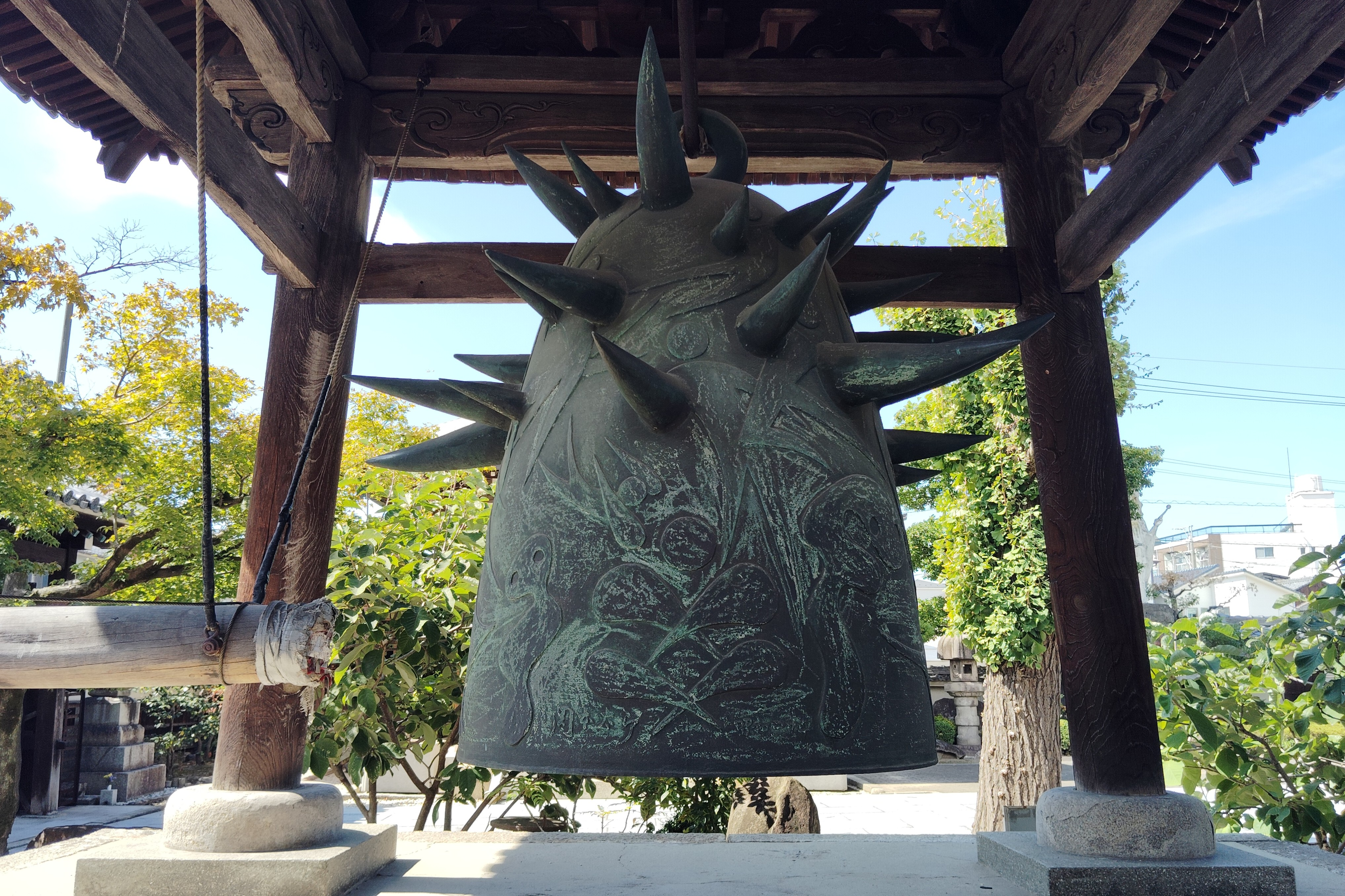
The "Bell of the Joy" on at the "Kyūkokuji" temple, Nagoya made by Tarō in 1965.

A prominent name in the art establishment, Okamoto began to have a series of solo exhibitions in the 1950s, at such prestigious venues at the art galleries of Mitsukoshi department store in Nihonbashi, Tokyo, and the Takashimaya department store in Osaka. His work was included in the Japanese presentation at the 2nd São Paulo Bienal in 1953 and the 27th Venice Biennale in 1954. Okamoto remained active as a Nika member, while also exhibiting in the non-juried, non-award-granting Yomiuri Indépendant Exhibition.

From the 1950s through the end of his career, Okamoto received numerous public commissions to create murals and large sculptures in Japan, including government buildings, office buildings, subway stations, museums, and other locations. Notable examples included ceramic murals for the old Tokyo Metropolitan Office Building in Marunouchi, designed by Kenzō Tange and completed in 1956, and five ceramic murals for Tange's Yoyogi National Gymnasium for the 1964 Tokyo Olympics.

During the 1950s, Okamoto theorized several key aesthetic ideas that helped establish his role as a public intellectual in Japanese society. First, he crafted his theory of "polarism" (taikyokushugi), the declaration of which he read at the opening of the Yomiuri Indépendant Exhibition in 1950. In 1952, Okamoto published an influential article on Jōmon period ceramics. This article was the beginning of a long engagement with prehistoric Japan, and his argument that Japanese aesthetics should take inspiration from the ancient Jōmon period helped change the public perception of Japanese culture. He continued to write on Japanese tradition and became one of the major thinkers active in the reevaluation of Japanese tradition after World War II. He later traveled around Japan in order to research the essence of Japanese culture, and published Nihon Sai-hakken－Geijutsu Fudoki ("Rediscovery of the Japan－Topography of Art") (1962) and Shinpi Nihon ("Mysteries in Japan") (1964), amply illustrated by photographs he took during his research trips. These works were an extension his ethnographic interest and taking his own photography helped provide strong evidence to his observations.

As part of his travels around Japan, in 1959 and 1966, Okamoto visited Okinawa. He was struck by what he saw as the remnants of a simpler and more indigenous life there. In 1961, he published Wasurerareta Nihon: Okinawa bunka-ron ("Forgotten Japan: On Okinawa culture"), which included many photographs from his trip. The book received the Mainichi Publication Culture Award. Many of Okamoto's photographs revisited Okinawa subject matter already photographed by other Japanese photographers, such as Ihei Kimura and Ken Dōmon. His interest in Okinawa may be seen as part of a larger modern Japanese interest in viewing Okinawa as a lingering repository of tradition, in contrast with the rapidly modernizing Japanese main islands.

In 1967, Okamoto visited Mexico, where he worked on a major mural commission and filmed a program for Japanese television entitled "The New World: Okamoto Tarō explores Latin America." Okamoto was deeply inspired by Mexican painting and saw it as an avenue to refocus the attention of Japan's art world away from Western countries. He imagined a partnership between Japanese and Mexican art worlds to launch a new, non-Western modern art aesthetic, and saw affinities between Japanese Jōmon culture and pre-Columbian art in Mexico. Allusions to Mexican art would appear in his subsequent artworks.

==== 1970–1996 ====
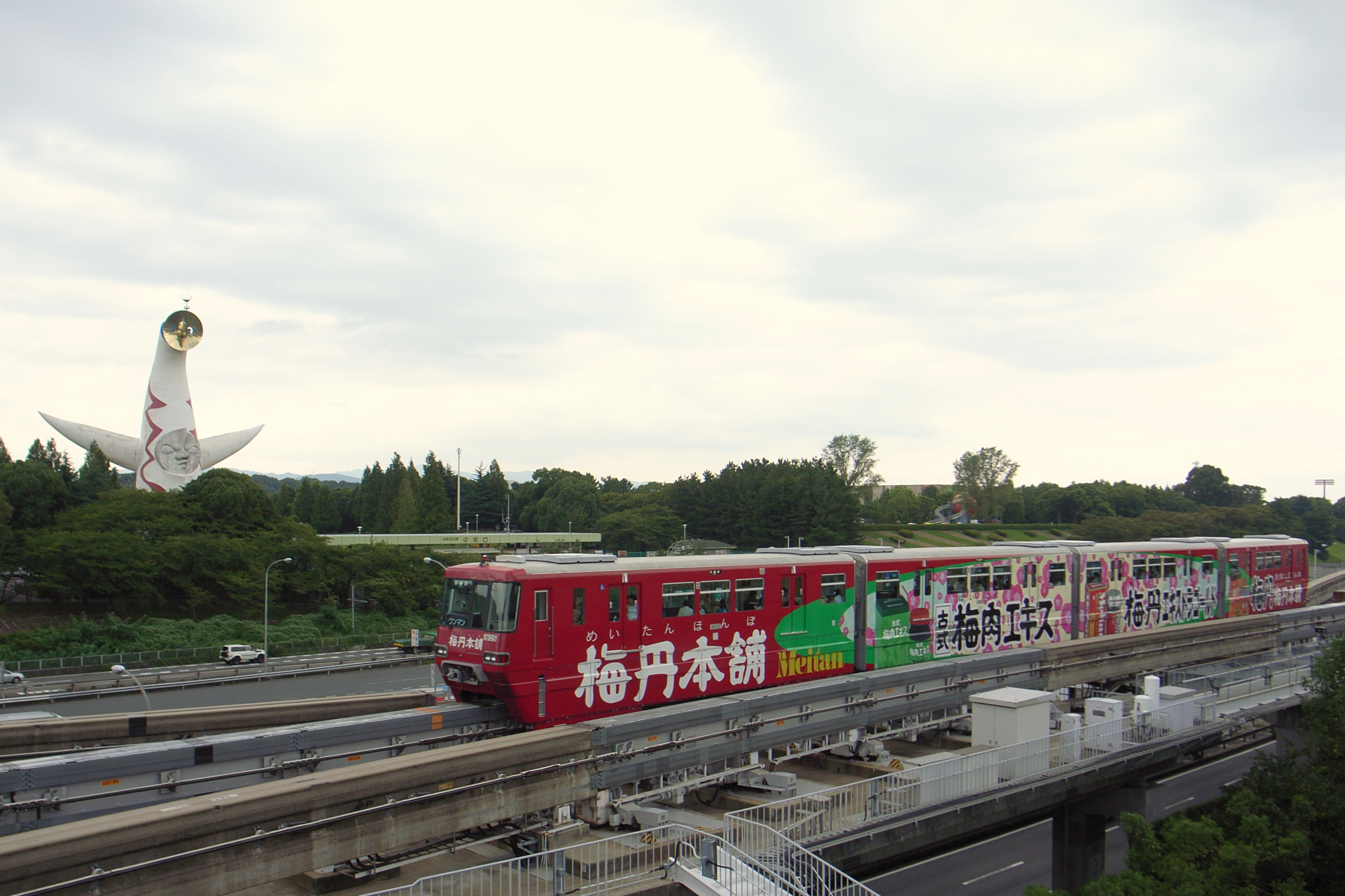
Tower of the Sun and the Osaka Monorail.

Okamoto continued to travel, write and produce public art works in the 1970s. He also began to produce prints, experimenting with silkscreen and copperplate printing.

Okamoto's most notable achievement of the 1970s was his involvement with 1970 Japan World Exposition in Osaka (Expo '70), for which he designed and produced the central Theme Pavilion, which included a monumental sculpture entitled Tower of the Sun, an exhibition in and around the tower, and two smaller towers. The distinct appearance of Tower of the Sun was influenced by Okamoto's background in European Surrealism, interest in Mexican art, and Jōmon ceramics. The pavilion was visited by over 9 million people during Expo '70, and is preserved today in the Expo Commemoration Park.

Toward the end of his career, Okamoto began to receive many more solo exhibitions of his work. In 1986, several of his early paintings were included in a major exhibition of Japanese avant-garde artists, Japon des Avant-Gardes 1910–1970 at the Centre Pompidou in Paris. In 1991, his major works were donated to Kawasaki city, and a museum in his honor was opened in 1999, following his death in 1996.

== Work ==
=== Artwork ===
==== Painting ====
Although very few of Okamoto's prewar paintings remain, during his early career in Paris he was interested in abstraction and showed a number of works with the Abstraction-Création group. However, over time he grew dissatisfied with the limitations of pure abstraction, and began to include more representational imagery in his paintings. The completion of Itamashiki ude ("Wounded Arm"), which melded abstraction and representation, convinced Okamoto that he should leave the Abstraction-Création group and explore other modes of painting. Itamashiki ude, which seems to depict a young girl through the representation of an arm, shoulder, hair, and bright red bow, disturbingly includes no human head or body, and the arm itself defies expectation with abstract stripes of flesh and bubble gum pink tones. Although the work was celebrated by the Surrealists in Paris, Okamoto opted out of joining the group.

Okamoto's postwar paintings, like his murals and public sculpture, continued to be informed by abstraction and Surrealism, but were also influenced by his theory of polarism, and by his discovery of prehistoric arts. The Law of the Jungle (1950), one of his most famous paintings, depicts a monstrous red fish-like creature with an enormous, zipper-shaped spine devouring a human figure. Small human and animal forms in vibrant primary colors surround the central creature, floating through the glowing green jungle setting. Many of the key features of this work – the mix of abstraction and surreal anthropomorphic forms, vibrant colors, and a flat picture plane – continued in his paintings for the rest of his career.

==== Key murals and sculptures ====
Tower of the Young Sun, 1969. Installed in Japan Monkey Park, Inuyama, Aichi Prefecture.

During his trip to Mexico in 1967, Okamoto painted a 5.5 x 30-meter mural in oil on canvas, entitled Myth of Tomorrow, for the Hotel de Mexico in Mexico city by Manuel Suarez y Suarez that was being constructed for the 1968 Olympics. The mural's subtitle is "Hiroshima and Nagasaki," and accordingly the painting illustrates a landscape of nuclear destruction where a skeleton burns in red and emits pointed white protrusions. Surrounding images allude to events of nuclear disaster, such as the incident with Lucky Dragon #5. The hotel was never completed and thus the mural was never installed or displayed. After being lost for 30 years in Mexico, on November 17, 2008, the mural was unveiled in its new permanent location at Shibuya Station, Tokyo.

Okamoto's Tower of the Sun became the symbol of Expo '70 in Osaka. Standing at 70 meters tall, the humanoid form was created in concrete and sprayed stucco, with two horn-shaped arms, two circular faces, and one golden metal face attached at its highest point. As a whole, it represents the past (lower part), present (middle part), and future (the face) of the human race. Visitors entered through the base of the sculpture and then ascended through it in escalators next to the so-called "Tree of Life," a sculptural tree displaying the evolution of creatures from primitive organisms toward more complex life forms. Visitors then exited through the arms of the sculpture. Constructed not long after Okamoto's visit to Mexico, the project was also inspired by pre-Columbian imagery. At the same time, the form of the tower resembled Jōmon figurines (dogū) and alluded to Cubist portraiture of Picasso. Unlike the apocalyptic Asu no shinwa ("Myth of Tomorrow"), the Tower ultimately had a more positive message: the eclectic inspirations for its imagery suggested the possibility of a more global modern art, and Okamoto imagined the tower and its surrounding plaza to facilitate a great gathering – rather than a great destruction – of people.

Both Asu no shinwa and Tower of the Sun display imagery that runs throughout much of Okamoto's public artworks. Works in a similar style include Young Clock Tower (1966) in Ginza, Tokyo, Tower of the Young Sun (1969) in Inuyama, Aichi prefecture, and Kodomo no ki ("Tree of Children") (1985) in Aoyama, Tokyo.

=== Art theory and writings ===
==== Polarism ====
Okamoto's idea of taikyokushugi (polarism) was born out of his attendance at lectures on Hegel while in Paris. He questioned dialectics and refused the notion of synthesis, believing rather that thesis and antithesis (polar opposites) could actually remain apart, resulting in permanent fragmentation rather than unity or resolution. This theory, proposed shortly after World War II, was in many ways an aesthetics that directly opposed the visual totality and harmony of Japanese wartime painting. In terms of its application to art, Okamoto saw abstract painting as synthesis – it united color, motion, and the various senses into one work. The Law of the Jungle (1950), however, is permanently fragmented: individual elements are clearly described in line and color, but resist any identification, and float in the painted space without any connection to one another. There is also a strong tension between flatness and depth, clarity and obscurity, foreground and background, representational and abstract. Dawn (1948) and Heavy Industry (1949) are also thought to be examples of polarism.

==== Tradition and contemporary art ====
Okamoto's Jōmon theory has become one of the most influential theoretical contributions to 20th century Japanese aesthetics and cultural history. The theory was first introduced in his seminal essay "Jōmon doki ron: Shijigen to no taiwa" ("On Jomon ceramics: Dialogue with the fourth dimension"), published in Mizue magazine in 1952. Inspired by a trip to Tokyo National Museum, where he viewed earthenware ceramic vessels and dogū from the prehistoric Jōmon period, the article argued for a complete rethinking of Japanese aesthetics. Okamoto believed that Japanese aesthetics until that point had been founded on the aesthetics of prehistoric Yayoi period ceramics, which were simple, subdued, restrained, and refined. This foundation gave rise to the what many considered traditional Japanese aesthetic concepts, such as wabi-sabi. By contrast, the energetic, rough, and mysterious patterns and designs of Jōmon ceramics offered a dynamic, authentic expression that was missing from contemporary Japan. He argued that Japanese artists should pursue the same dynamic power and mystery to fuel their own work, drawing inspiration from this more "primitive" culture of their ancestors. Okamoto's understanding of Japanese aesthetics drew heavily from his ethnographic studies and encounters with Surrealism in Paris, but instead of exoticizing ethnographic objects, he used Jōmon objects specifically to construct a native theoretical basis for Japanese avant-garde artistic practices.

Despite Okamoto's interest in prehistoric art, he did not advocate for any direct preservation of the past in contemporary art. His best-selling book Konnichi no geijutsu (The Art of Today), published in 1954, encouraged young artists to destroy violently any past art systems and rebuild a Japanese art world equal to the Western art world. This could be seen as a way of advocating a form of Jōmon-style energy and expression.

== "Myth of Tomorrow" Restoration Project ==
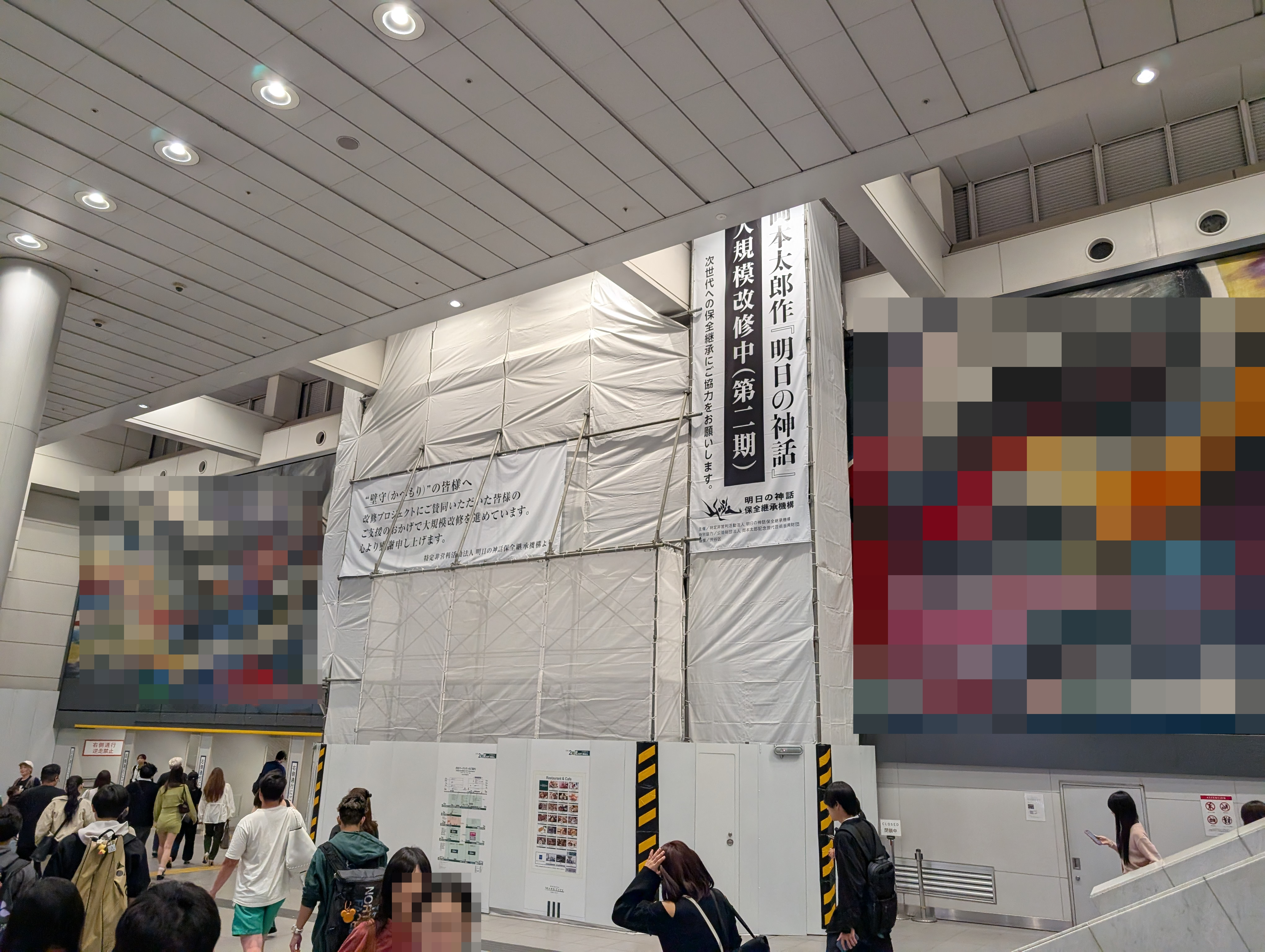
The "Myth of Tomorrow" under restoration (October 2024).

A long-lost work by Tarō Okamoto was discovered in the suburbs of Mexico City in the fall of 2003. It is a huge mural titled "Myth of Tomorrow". It depicts the tragic moment when the atomic bomb exploded. The work conveys Tarō Okamoto's strong message that people can overcome even the cruelest tragedy with pride, and that "The Myth of Tomorrow" will be born in its wake. However, the work had been left in a poor environment for many years and was severely damaged. Therefore, the Taro Okamoto Memorial Museum Foundation launched the "Myth of Tomorrow" Restoration Project to transport the work to Japan, restore it, and then exhibit it widely to the public. The restoration was completed in June 2006, and the first public viewing of the work was held in Shiodome in July of the same year, attracting a total of 2 million visitors in a short period of 50 days. The work was later exhibited at the Museum of Contemporary Art Tokyo from April 2007 to June 2008, and in March 2008 it was decided to permanently install the work in Shibuya, where it has been on view since November 18, 2008 in the connecting passageway of Shibuya Mark City. In the summer of 2023 further restoration work was done.

== Collections and legacy ==
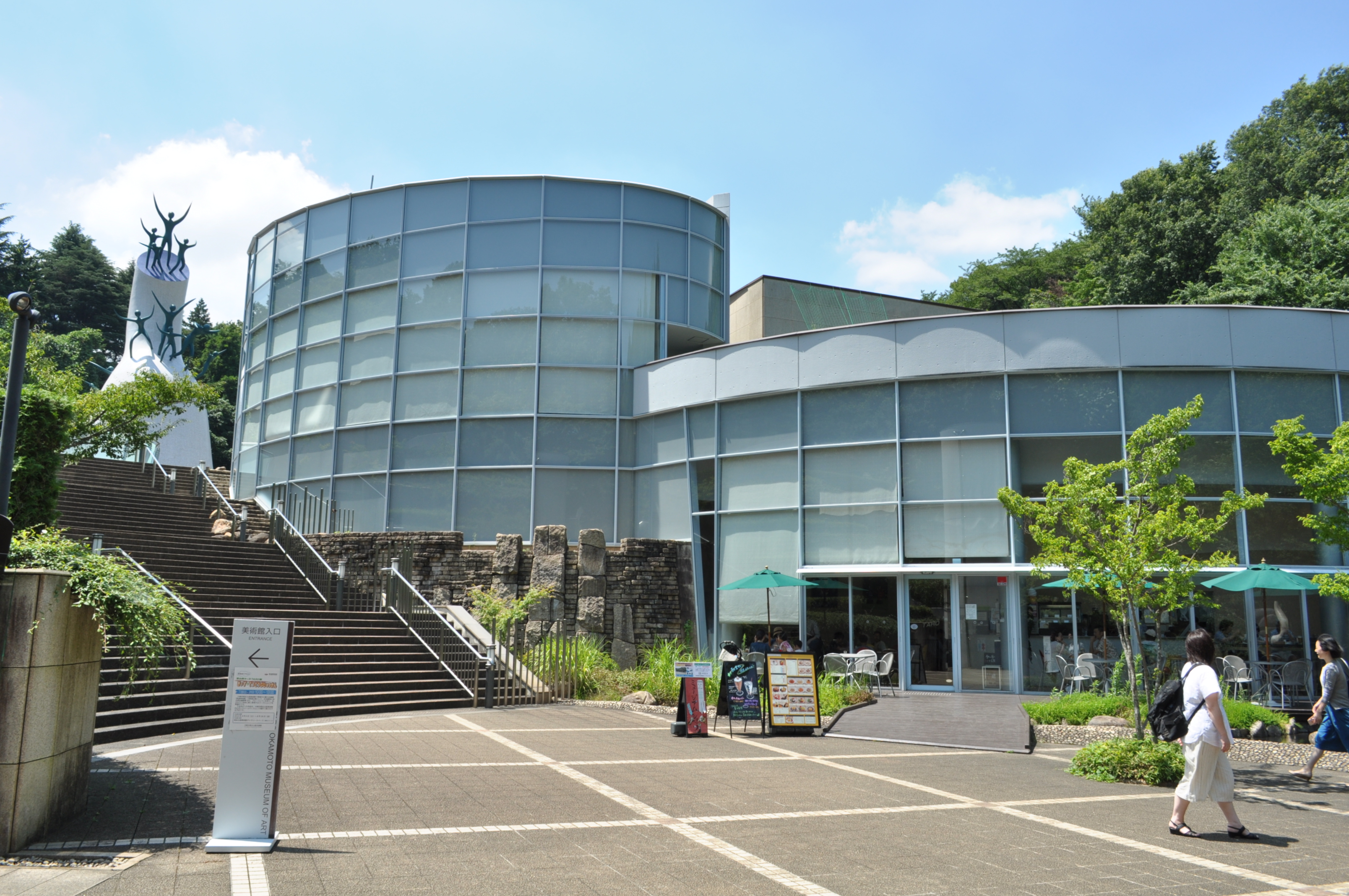
Tarō Okamoto Museum of Art, Kanagawa, with Tower of Mother (Haha no Tō) in the background

Much of Okamoto's work is held by the Tarō Okamoto Museum of Art in Kawasaki and the Tarō Okamoto Memorial Museum, which is housed in the artist's former studio and home built by the architect Junzō Sakakura in 1954 in Aoyama, Tokyo. Both museums organize special exhibitions addressing key themes in Okamoto's oeuvre, such as Jōmon artifacts, Okinawa, and public artworks. Okamoto's works are also held by the Solomon R. Guggenheim Museum, the National Museum of Modern Art, Tokyo, the National Museum of Modern Art, Kyoto, and the Toyama Prefectural Museum of Art and Design.

The Tarō Okamoto Award for Contemporary Art (TARO Award) was established in 1997 and is run by the Tarō Okamoto Museum of Art in Kawasaki. The award is given annually to young contemporary artists who are creating art of the next generation, and who display the creativity and individuality he advocated for in The Art of Today (1954).

== Sources ==
- Jonathan Reynolds, "Uncanny, Hypermodern Japaneseness: Okamoto Tarō and the Search for Prehistoric Modernism," in Allegories of time and space: Japanese identity in photography and architecture (Honolulu: University of Hawai’i, 2017), 54–85.
- K. Yoshida, Avant-garde art and non-dominant thought in postwar Japan: image, matter, separation (New York: Routledge, Taylor & Francis Group, 2021).
- Bert Winther-Tamaki, "To Put on a Big Face: The Globalist Stance of Okamoto Tarō’s Tower of the sun for the Japan World Exposition," Review of Japanese Culture and Society Vol. 23 (2011): 81–101.
- 川崎市岡本太郎美術館, ed. 岡本太郎の絵画 : 開館10周年記念展 = The Paintings of Tarō Okamoto. Kawasaki-shi: Kawasaki-shi Okamoto Tarō Bijutsukan, 2009.
- Okamoto Tarō & Jonathan M. Reynolds (Translator), "On Jōmon Ceramics," Art in Translation 1:1 (2009), 49–60, DOI: 10.2752/175613109787307645
