= The Crow Club =

2026 Thai television series

- Official series poster
- Thai: อีกาสมาคม
- Genre: Boys' love; Drama; Mystery; Romance
- Directed by: Nopachai Jayanama
- Starring: Cris Horwang; Nawaphat Thannamongkhonsawat; Natchanon Supravorawong; Pataraphol Wanlopsiri; Tanatorn Saengngernkanokkul; Phachara Thanakulwuttiporn; Nattanon Wanichakul; Hemmawich Kwanamphaiphan; Thanapon Aiemkumchai; Pimprapa Tangprabhaporn; Anuwat Choocherdratana
- Country of origin: Thailand
- Original language: Thai
- No. of seasons: 1

Production
- Producers: Saithip Montrikun Na Ayudhaya; Vorarit Vaijairanai
- Production company: Change2561

Original release
- Network: One 31; OneD; Netflix

The Crow Club (Thai: อีกาสมาคม) is a Thai boys' love mystery romance television series directed by Nopachai Jayanama (Peter ) and produced by Change2561. The series stars Hemmawich Kwanamphaiphan (Sailub), Thanapon Aiemkumchai (Pon), Cris Horwang, Nawaphat Thannamongkhonsawat (Newyear), Natchanon Supravorawong (Milk), Pataraphol Wanlopsiri (Pop), Tanatorn Saengngernkanokkul (Title), Phachara Thanakulwuttiporn (Otto), and Nattanon Wanichakul (BJ).

The project was officially announced on 28 January 2026 during the Changeverse 2026 event, alongside the BL series The Grim Lover and Class Crush Crisis, where its official pilot was released on YouTube. By July 2026, the 7-minute and 37-second pilot had surpassed 600,000 views. The series is scheduled to premiere in 2026 on One 31, OneD, and Netflix internationally.

== Synopsis ==
The Crow Club follows a secret society made up of social outcasts who undertake unusual assignments for equally mysterious clients. As they investigate strange cases, the members develop close bonds while experiencing different love stories.

== Cast and characters ==
=== Main ===
- Hemmawich Kwanamphaiphan (Sailub) as Talay
- Thanapon Aiemkumchai (Pon) as Sun
- Cris Horwang
- Nawaphat Thannamongkhonsawat (Newyear) as Rakkhun
- Natchanon Supravorawong (Milk)
- Pataraphol Wanlopsiri (Pop)
- Tanatorn Saengngernkanokkul (Title) as Run
- Phachara Thanakulwuttiporn (Otto) as Taengmo
- Nattanon Wanichakul (BJ)

=== Guest ===
- Pimprapa Tangprabhaporn (Pim)
- Anuwat Choocherdratana (Golf)

== Production ==
The series was announced by Change2561 during the Changeverse 2026 event, held on 28 January 2026 at Iconsiam in Bangkok. The event also featured the release of the series' official pilot. Workshops with the series' main cast began on June 12.
