= Natchanon Supravorawong =

Thai actor and model (born 2001)

- ณัฐชนน ศุภวรวงค์
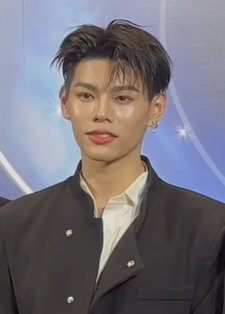
- Born: Natchanon Supravorawong; 2 May 2001 (age 25); Thailand
- Other name: Milk
- Education: King Mongkut's Institute of Technology Ladkrabang
- Occupations: Actor; Model
- Years active: 2022–present
- Agent: Change2561
- Known for: Peak in War of Y; Phat in My Universe; Willy in Pit Babe 2; Vann in The Crow Club

Natchanon Supravorawong (Thai: ณัฐชนน ศุภวรวงค์; born 2 May 2001), nicknamed Milk (Thai: มิ้ล), is a Thai actor and model signed with Change2561. He became known for starring in the AIS Play series War of Y (2022), My Universe (2023), broadcast on Amarin TV and iQIYI. In 2025, he portrayed Willy in the second season of Pit Babe 2, broadcast on One 31. In 2026, he stars in The Crow Club, which is scheduled to air on One 31 and Netflix.

== Biography and career ==
Natchanon graduated with a degree in Business Administration from the international program at King Mongkut's Institute of Technology Ladkrabang. Before becoming an actor, he worked as a model. In 2022, he appeared in the Louis Vuitton Men's Fall/Winter campaign and made his acting debut in War of Y, portraying Peak, one of the series' main characters.

In 2023, he portrayed Phat in the Right Time, Right You segment of the anthology series My Universe, also as one of the main characters. In 2025, he joined the cast of Pit Babe 2, portraying Willy, one of the series' antagonists.

In 2026, he was announced as one of the lead actors in The Crow Club, a CHANGE2561 ORIGINAL production, portraying Vann. The series will be broadcast on One 31 and Netflix. In the series, he will be paired with actor Nawaphat Thannamongkhonsawat (Newyear).

== Filmography ==
=== Television ===
Year	Title	Role	Network / Platform	Notes
2022	War of Y	Peak	AIS Play	Main role
2023	My Universe	Phat	Amarin TV	Main role
2025	Pit Babe 2	Willy	One31 iQIYI Netflix	Supporting role
2026	Class Crush Crisis	The hot, annoying guy from the movies	One31; Netflix	Guest role (Ep.2)
2026	The Crow Club	Vann	One31; Netflix oneD	Main role

== Fan meetings ==
Year	Date	Event	Country/Region	Venue	Ref.
2025	2 May	Pit Babe 2 First Premiere	Thailand	Siam Pavalai Royal Grand Theatre	
2025	25 July	Pit Babe 2 Final EP. Fan Meeting	Thailand	Siam Pavalai Royal Grand Theatre	
2025	3 August	Pit Babe 2 Level Up Fan Meeting Tour	Hong Kong	Sheraton Hong Kong Tung Chung Hotel	
2025	9 August	Pit Babe 2 Level Up Fan Meeting Tour	Vietnam	Hoa Binh Cultural Center, District 10	—
2025	23 August	Pit Babe 2 Level Up Fan Meeting Tour	Japan	Tempo Harbor Theater	
2025	6 September	Pit Babe 2 Level Up Fan Meeting Tour	Philippines	UP Theater	
2025	20 September	Pit Babe 2 Level Up Fan Meeting Tour	Macau	Lisboeta H853 Entertainment Centre	—
2025	2 October	Pit Babe 2 Level Up Fan Meeting Tour	Mexico	Circo Volador	—
2025	5 October	Pit Babe 2 Level Up Fan Meeting Tour	Brazil	Terra SP	

== Awards and nominations ==
Award	Year	Work	Category	Result	Ref.
Y Entertain Awards	2025	Pit Babe 2	Y Star on Spotlight of the Year	Won	
Kazz Awards	2026	—N/a	Rising Male Artist of the Year	Nominated	
