= Pataraphol Wanlopsiri =

Thai actor (born 2000)

- ภัทรพล วัลลภศิริ
- Born: Pataraphol Wanlopsiri; 21 March 2000 (age 26); Thailand
- Other name: Pop
- Education: Bangkok University
- Occupation: Actor
- Years active: 2022–present
- Agent: Change2561

Pataraphol Wanlopsiri (Thai: ภัทรพล วัลลภศิริ; born 21 March 2000), nicknamed Pop, is a Thai actor signed under Change2561. He is best known for portraying Ram in La Cuisine (2022), Winner in Pit Babe (2023), and Banjong in I'm the Most Beautiful Count (2025). In 2026, he stars in The Crow Club, broadcast on One31 and Netflix.

== Biography ==
Pataraphol was born in Thailand. He graduated with a degree in Hotel Management from Bangkok University in 2023.

He made his acting debut in 2022 by portraying Ram, one of the lead characters in the BL series La Cuisine.

In 2023, he joined the cast of Pit Babe, portraying Winner. In 2024, he appeared in Club Friday The Series 16: One Night Stand and Affair.

In 2025, he reprised his role as Winner in Pit Babe 2, starred in productions from the Club Friday The Series franchise, and was announced as one of the lead cast members of The Crow Club, where he is paired with Tanatorn Saenangkanikorn (Title).

== Filmography ==
=== Television ===
Year	Title	Role	Network / Platform	Notes
2022	La Cuisine	Ram	MCOT HD	Main role
2022	Friend to Enemy		Amarin TV	Supporting role
2023	Pit Babe	Winner	One31	Supporting role
2024	Club Friday The Series 16: One Night Stand	Mac	One31	Main role
2024	Golden Blood	Ben	One31	Guest role
2024	Affair	Ek	One31	Supporting role
2025	Club Friday The Series 17: Theory of 21 Days	Euro	One31	Main role
2025	Pit Babe 2	Winner	One31 iQIYI	Supporting role
2025	Club Friday The Series 17: The Rule of Obsession	Porsche	One31	Main role
2025	I'm the Most Beautiful Count	Banjong	One31; Netflix	Main role
2026	The Crow Club		One31; Netflix	Main role

== Fan meetings ==
Year	Date	Event	Country/Region	Venue	Ref.
2023	17 November	Pit Babe The Series First Premiere	Thailand	Siam Pavalai Royal Grand Theatre	
2024	9 February	Pit Babe Final EP Fan Meeting	Thailand	Siam Pavalai Royal Grand Theatre	
2024	2–3 March	Pit Babe 1st Fan Meeting: Love's Journey	Thailand	ICONSIAM Hall	
2024	17 November	Pit Babe 1st Anniversary "Level Up" Fan Meeting	Thailand	ICONSIAM Hall	
2025	2 May	Pit Babe 2 First Premiere	Thailand	Siam Pavalai Royal Grand Theatre	
2025	25 July	Pit Babe 2 Final EP Fan Meeting	Thailand	Siam Pavalai Royal Grand Theatre	
2025	August–October	Pit Babe 2 Level Up Fan Meeting Tour	Hong Kong, Vietnam, Japan, the Philippines, Macau, Mexico and Brazil		
