= Krittin Kitjaruwannakul =

Thai actor (born 2003)

- กฤติน กิจจารุวรรณกุล
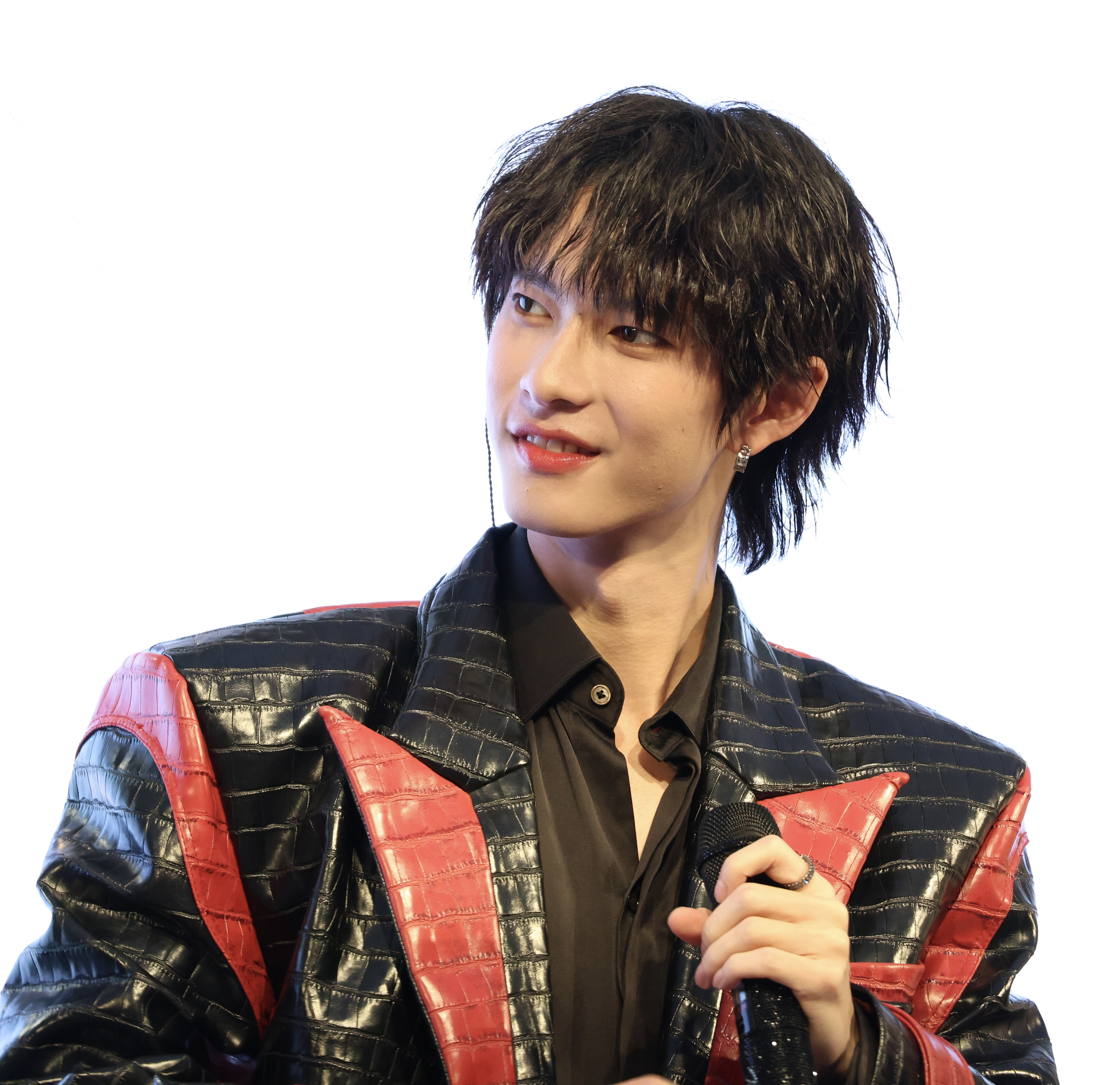
- Krittin in December 2024
- Born: 4 July 2003 (age 23); Thailand
- Other name: Pooh
- Education: Chulalongkorn University
- Occupation: Actor
- Years active: 2023–present
- Agent: Change2561
- Known for: Charlie in Pit Babe

Krittin Kitjaruwannakul (Thai: กฤติน กิจจารุวรรณกุล; born 4 July 2003), nicknamed Pooh (Thai: พูห์), is a Thai actor. He is best known for his role as Charlie in Pit Babe.

== Early life and education ==
Krittin was born in Thailand. As of 2025 he is pursuing a bachelor's degree in Robotics and Artificial Intelligence at Chulalongkorn University.

== Career ==
In 2023, Pooh signed with the production and talent agency CHANGE2561. That same year, he made his acting debut in the series Pit Babe as Charlie, a young graduate who dreams of becoming a race car driver but lacks his own car. He seeks help from Babe (Pavel Naret), a famous racer.

In May 2025, he returned for the second season of the series, titled Pit Babe 2. In late 2025 he starred in the horror mystery series Goddess Bless You from Death alongside Naret Promphaopun.

== Filmography ==
=== Television series ===
Year	Title	Role	Notes	Network
2023	Pit Babe	Charlie	Main role	iQIYI, One31
2025	Pit Babe 2	Charlie	Main role	iQIYI, One31
2025	Goddess Bless You From Death	Thup Thammawat	Main role	iQIYI, One31
2026	The Grim Lover	Fourteen/Sipsi & Rafah	Main role	iQIYI, One31

== Awards and nominations ==
Award ceremony, year, category, nominee/work and result
Award	Year	Category	Nominee/work	Result	Ref.
Bangkok Pride Awards	2026	Pride Popular of Y Series Star	with Naret Promphaopun	Nominated	
Feed x Khaosod Awards	2025	Best Chemistry	with Naret Promphaopun	Won	
Feed x Khaosod Awards	2026	Popular Male Actor	Krittin Kitjaruwannakul	Won	
Feed x Khaosod Awards	2026	Best Chemistry (Popular Vote)	with Naret Promphaopun	Won	
Feed x Khaosod Awards	2026	Boys' Love Actor of the Year	Krittin Kitjaruwannakul	Nominated	
Global Empower Awards	2026	Best Viral BL Couple Award	with Naret Promphaopun	Won	
Howe Awards	2025	Rising Icon	Krittin Kitjaruwannakul	Won	
Japan Expo	2025	Next Generation Award	with Naret Promphaopun	Won	
Kazz Awards	2026	Couple of the Year	with Naret Promphaopun	Nominated	
Kazz Awards	2026	Outstanding Actor of the Year	Krittin Kitjaruwannakul	Won	
Kinnaree Public Awards	2026	Popular Leading Actor Award	with Naret Promphaopun	Won	
Maya TV Awards	2026	Male Couple of the Year	with Naret Promphaopun	Nominated	
Mint Awards	2024	Rookie of the Year	with Naret Promphaopun	Won	
National Youth Day	2025	Artist of the Year	Krittin Kitjaruwannakul	Won	
Thailand Y Content Awards	2025	Popular Vote	Krittin Kitjaruwannakul	Won	
The Viral Hits Awards	2025	Best BL Couple of the Year	with Naret Promphaopun	Nominated	
The Viral Hits Awards	2025	Best BL Actor of the Year	Krittin Kitjaruwannakul	Nominated	
Y Entertain Awards	2024	Prince of Boys' Love	Krittin Kitjaruwannakul	Won	
Y Entertain Awards	2025	Prince of Boys' Love	Krittin Kitjaruwannakul	Nominated	
Y Entertain Awards	2025	Y Couple of the Year	with Naret Promphaopun	Nominated	
Y Entertain Awards	2026	Y Couple of the Year	with Naret Promphaopun	Won	
Y Entertain Awards	2026	Prince of Boys' Love	Krittin Kitjaruwannakul	Nominated	
