= Vasin Traiprakhong =

Thai actor and singer (born 2005)

- วศิน ไตรประคอง
- Born: 5 November 2005 (age 20); Thailand
- Other name: Jur (เจ๋อ)
- Occupations: Actor; singer
- Years active: 2023–present
- Agent: HJ / Jinloe Media
- Height: 1.83 m (6 ft 0 in)

Vasin Traiprakhong (Thai: วศิน ไตรประคอง; born 5 November 2005), nicknamed Jur (Thai: เจ๋อ), is a Thai actor and singer. He made his acting debut in 2023, starring in the BL series Hit Bite Love. The same year, he starred in the feature film Firstly "Like" You. In 2024, he appeared in Addicted Heroin.

== Early life and education ==
Vasin was born in Thailand. He is 1.83 m tall. He was in his third year of high school when he made his acting debut.

== Career ==
His acting debut came in 2023 in the series Hit Bite Love, where he played Burger (Burinphat), one of the lead characters alongside Newyear Nawaphat. The series aired on Amarin TV 34 HD and was also released on YouTube. The same year, he also appeared in the film Firstly "Like" You, reprising his role as Burger.

In 2024, Jur participated in Addicted Heroin, the Thai adaptation of the famous Chinese BL series, playing Tiger (Yawamon). He also contributed to the soundtrack, recording the song "Fly Fly Away" with other cast members.

== Filmography ==
=== Television ===
Year	Title	Role	Notes	Ref.
2023	Hit Bite Love	Burger (Burinphat)	Main role	
2024	Addicted Heroin	Yawamon (Tiger)	Supporting role	

=== Film ===
Year	Title	Role	Notes
2023	Firstly "Like" You	Burger (Burinphat)	Main role

== Discography ==
=== Soundtrack appearances ===
Year	Title	Artist(s)	Album / Notes
2023	Hit Me Bite Me	Jur, Tae, Newyear, Pure, BigBoss, Vic and Alan	Hit Bite Love OST
2024	Fly Fly Away.	August, Mac, Newyear and Jur	Addicted Heroin OST

== Events ==
Year	Event	Venue	Country	Notes
2023	LACON: A Thai Fandom Event	Philippine Trade Training Center, Manila	Philippines	Event featuring the cast of Hit Bite Love held on 8 July 2023.
2024	Addicted Heroin World Premiere	Major Cineplex Sukhumvit, Bangkok	Thailand	World premiere event for Addicted Heroin held on 13 August 2024.

== Awards and nominations ==
Year	Award	Category	Work	Result	Ref.
2024	Kinaree Thong Mahachon Awards	Best Rising Actor (นักแสดงดาวรุ่งรุ่นใหม่แห่งปี)	Hit Bite Love	Won	
