= This Love Doesn't Have Long Beans =

2024 Thai television series

- Thai: รักนี้ไม่มีถั่วฝักยาว
- Genre: Boys' love; Romantic comedy; Drama
- Based on: This Love Doesn't Have Long Beans by Ninepinta
- Directed by: Nui Suttasit
- Starring: Hemmawich Kwanamphaiphan; Thanapon Aiemkumchai; Atthanin Thaninpanuvivat; Pantach Kankham; Kiettisak Vatanavitsakul; Asre Watthanayakul; Tanawat Hudchaleelaha; Kasama Khamtanit; Jiratchaya Kittavornsakul
- Country of origin: Thailand
- Original language: Thai
- No. of episodes: 8

Production
- Executive producers: Saithip Montrikun Na Ayudhaya; Vorarit Vaijairanai
- Running time: 58 minutes
- Production company: Change2561

Original release
- Network: One 31; iQIYI
- Release: 5 July – 23 August 2024

This Love Doesn't Have Long Beans (Thai: รักนี้ไม่มีถั่วฝักยาว; RTGS: Rak Ni Mai Mi Thua Fak Yao) is a Thai boys' love romantic comedy drama television series that aired on One 31 from 5 July to 23 August 2024. Produced by Change2561, the series is based on the novel of the same name by Ninepinta, winner of the 2022 WebNovel Spirity Award.

Starring Hemmawich Kwanamphaiphan and Thanapon Aiemkumchai, the series follows a former model who infiltrates a culinary competition with a secret mission to win the heart of a famous chef and become his successor. In 2026, the series was added to the international catalogue of Netflix.

== Premise ==
Plawan, a former model with a passion for pad kaprao, is struggling financially when he accepts an unusual offer from businessman Metas. His task is to enter a competition organized by renowned chef Oab, who is searching for a successor to inherit his restaurant. As Plawan learns culinary techniques and competes against other aspiring chefs, he is secretly instructed to gain Oab's trust and persuade him to abandon his plans. However, the closer he grows to the stern but talented chef, the more difficult it becomes to separate his mission from his genuine feelings.

== Cast and characters ==
=== Main ===
- Hemmawich Kwanamphaiphan as Chef Oab
- Thanapon Aiemkumchai as Plawan

=== Supporting ===
- Pantach Kankham (Garfield) as JJ
- Atthanin Thaninpanuvivat (Benz) as Metas
- Kiettisak Vatanavitsakul as Nab Nueng
- Asre Watthanayakul as Auto
- Tanawat Hudchaleelaha as Pansip
- Kasama Khamtanit as Kluea
- Jiratchaya Kittavornsakul as Khaosuay

== Production ==
The adaptation was announced by Change2561 in March 2024 as the company's second BL project following the success of Pit Babe. The series was officially unveiled at a press event in Bangkok attended by the principal cast and company executives.

== Release ==
The series premiered on One 31 on 5 July 2024 and aired weekly on Fridays. An uncut version was simultaneously released through iQIYI. In 2026, the series became available internationally on Netflix.

== Awards and nominations ==
Year	Award	Category	Recipient(s)	Result
2025	Thailand Box Office Awards 2024	Series of the Year (BL)	This Love Doesn't Have Long Beans	Nominated
2025	Thailand Box Office Awards 2024	Best Couple of the Year	Hemmawich Kwanamphaiphan and Thanapon Aiemkumchai	Nominated
