= Pantach Kankham =

Thai actor (born 1998)

- พันธุ์ธัช กันคํา
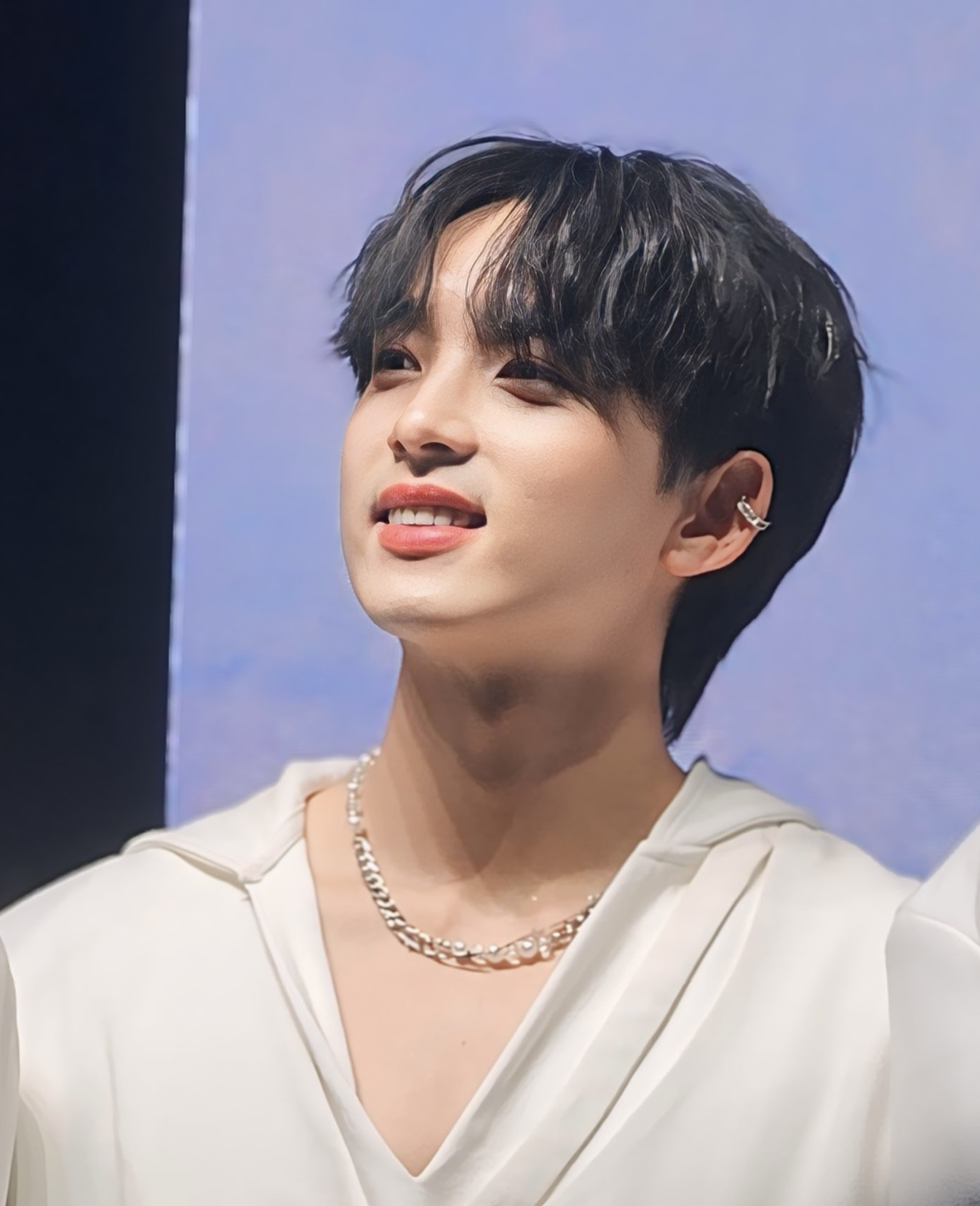
- Born: Pantach Kankham; 3 March 1998 (age 28); Chiang Rai, Thailand
- Other name: Garfield
- Education: Chiang Mai University (BBA)
- Occupation: Actor
- Years active: 2017–present
- Relatives: Phongsaphat Kankham (Fluke) (brother)

Pantach Kankham (Thai: พันธุ์ธัช กันคํา; born 3 March 1998), nicknamed Garfield (Thai: กาฟิวส์), is a Thai actor under Change2561. His notable works include D'Cup, Pit Babe, This Love Doesn't Have Long Beans, and Pit Babe 2.

== Personal life ==
Pantach was born in Chiang Rai, Thailand. He stands 180 cm tall and weighs 66 kg. In 2022, he graduated from Chiang Mai University with a bachelor's degree in Business Administration. He has an older brother, an older sister, and a younger brother. His older brother is Channel 3 actor Phongsaphat Kankham (Fluke).

== Career ==
Pantach made his acting debut playing the lead role of Pay in the television series D'Cup. In 2018, he participated in the "GSBGEN CAMPUS STAR 2018" competition. In October 2019, the film Dew the Movie, in which he had a supporting role as Top, was released. He received a nomination for Best Supporting Actor for his performance.

In 2022, Pantach played the lead role of Pangpond in Club Friday 14: Love & Belief – 7 Years of Love.

On February 9, 2023, Pantach participated in the audition for the new drama from CHANGE2561, Pit Babe. In March of the same year, the variety show Boy Journey, filmed with the 12 selected actors, was aired.

On June 22, 2023, the director of the series announced on the final episode of Boy Journey that Pantach would play the supporting role of Kenta in Pit Babe. Although his character did not have a romantic arc with Kim, played by Atthanin Thaninpanuvivat, they were promoted as an on-screen couple for promotional purposes.

On March 20, 2024, CHANGE2561 announced that Pantach would play a supporting role in the new drama This Love Doesn't Have Long Beans, pairing romantically with Atthanin Thaninpanuvivat (Benz) for the first time.

On April 25, 2024, CHANGE2561 announced at its launch event that Pantach would participate in the new drama Pit Babe 2.

On January 21, 2026, CHANGE2561 officially announced the end of the on-screen couple partnership between Pantach and Atthanin Thaninpanuvivat (Benz).

== Filmography ==
=== Television ===
Year	Title	Role	Network	Notes
2017	D'Cup	Pay	—N/a	Main role
2021	I Told Sunset About You 2	Ham	Line TV	Special appearance (Ep. 3)
2022	Club Friday 14: Love & Belief – 7 Years of Love	Pangpond	One 31	Main role
2023	Family Full of Guests	Paul	One 31	Supporting role
2023	Pit Babe	Kenta	One 31	Supporting role
2024	Club FridayClub Friday 16: Hot Love Issue – Love Until Death	Gap	One 31	Main role
2024	This Love Doesn't Have Long Beans	JJ	One 31	Supporting role
2025	Pit Babe 2	Kenta	One 31	Supporting role
2025	Club Friday 17: Love Theory – Trust in Love	Oak	One 31	Main role

=== Film ===
Year	Title	Role	Notes
2019	Dew the Movie	Top	Supporting role

=== Variety shows ===
Year	Title	Notes	Ref.
2023	Boys Journey	Cast member	
2025	Boys Journey Outing	Cast member	

== Discography ==
=== Singles ===
Year	Release date	Title	Participating artists	Notes	Ref.
2023	November 17	"Speed of Love"	Series cast	Pit Babe OST	
2024	January 19	"Phuchai Rai Rai" (Bad Guy)	Atthanin Thaninpanuvivat, Pattaraphol Wanluesiri, Asri Wattanayakul	Pit Babe OST	
2024	February 2	"Thung Ja Noi Tae 100%" (Forever)	Series cast	Pit Babe OST	
2024	July 18	"Thum Jai" (No Lies)	Atthanin Thaninpanuvivat	This Love Doesn't Have Long Beans OST	
2024	November 15	"Level Up"	Series cast	Pit Babe 2 OST	
2024	November 17	"Ja Crazy" (Crazy Over You)	Thanaphon Aiankhajorn, Supakorn Sako, Pattaraphol Wanluesiri	—N/a	
2025	January 21	"Fin Thuk Dok" (Outing)	Series cast	Boys Journey Outing theme	
2025	July 25	"Kot Thi"	Series cast	Pit Babe 2 OST	

== Live performances ==
=== Fan meetings ===
Year	Date	Fan Meeting Name	Country/Region	Venue	Ref.
2023	May 22	Pit Babe Soft Fan Meeting	Thailand	Royal Paragon	
2023	November 17	Pit Babe Series Premiere	Thailand	Siam Pavalai Royal Grand Theatre	
2024	February 9	Pit Babe Final Episode Fan Meeting	Thailand	Siam Pavalai Royal Grand Theatre	
2024	March 2–3	Pit Babe 1st Fan Meeting – Love's Journey	Thailand	ICONSIAM Hall	
2024	March 16	Pit Babe 1st Fan Meeting Love's Journey Asia Tour	Hong Kong	Ocean Park – Yee King Fong	
2024	April 7	Pit Babe 1st Fan Meeting Love's Journey Asia Tour	Japan	Japan Fire Department Hall	
2024	May 11	Pit Babe 1st Fan Meeting Love's Journey Asia Tour	Seoul (South Korea)	Baekam Art Hall	
2024	May 19	Pit Babe 1st Fan Meeting Love's Journey Asia Tour	Taiwan	Legacy MAX (Xinyi Theater)	
2024	June 8	Pit Babe 1st Fan Meeting Love's Journey Asia Tour	Vietnam	Hoa Binh Theater	
2024	June 22	Pit Babe 1st Fan Meeting Love's Journey Asia Tour	Philippines	SM North EDSA Sky Dome	
2024	July 5	"This Love Doesn't Have Long Beans" Premiere	Thailand	Siam Pavalai Royal Grand Theatre	
2024	July 14	Pit Babe 1st Fan Meeting Love's Journey Asia Tour	Macau	Broadway Theater	
2024	August 17	Pit Babe 1st Fan Meeting – Love's Journey	Brazil	Terra SP	
2024	August 23	"This Love Doesn't Have Long Beans" Final Episode Fan Meeting	Thailand	Siam Pavalai Royal Grand Theatre	
2024	September 8	Pit Babe 1st Fan Meeting Love's Journey Asia Tour	Cambodia	Naba Theatre	
2024	October 17	Pit Babe: The Movie	Thailand	Siam Pavalai Royal Grand Theatre	—
2024	November 17	Pit Babe 1st Anniversary 'Level Up' Fan Meeting	Thailand	ICONSIAM Hall	
2024	November 23	Sailub Pon Benz Garfield 1st Fan Meeting	Philippines	Teatrino Greenhills	
2025	January 11	Sailub Pon Benz Garfield 1st Fan Meeting	Taiwan	Hua Yang Exhibition Space	
2025	February 15	Dream Date with Tua Fak Yao the Gang	Cambodia	Naba Theatre	—
2025	February 23	Sailub Pon Benz Garfield 1st Fan Meeting	Macau	G Box	—
2025	May 2	Pit Babe 2 Premiere	Thailand	Siam Pavalai Royal Grand Theatre	
2025	July 25	Pit Babe 2 Final Episode Fan Meeting	Thailand	Siam Pavalai Royal Grand Theatre	
2025	August 3	Pit Babe 2 Level Up Fan Meeting Tour	Hong Kong	Sheraton Hong Kong Tung Chung	
2025	August 9	Pit Babe 2 Level Up Fan Meeting Tour	Vietnam	Cultural Peace Center – District 10	—
2025	August 23	Pit Babe 2 Level Up Fan Meeting Tour	Japan	Tempo Harbor Theater	
2025	September 6	Pit Babe 2 Level Up Fan Meeting Tour	Philippines	UP Theater	
2025	September 20	Pit Babe 2 Level Up Fan Meeting Tour	Macau	H853 Entertainment Hall – The Lisboeta	—
2025	October 2	Pit Babe 2 Level Up Fan Meeting Tour	Mexico	Circo Volador	—
2025	October 5	Pit Babe 2 Level Up Fan Meeting Tour	Brazil	Terra SP	

== Awards and nominations ==
Ceremony	Year	Nominated work	Category	Result
Thailand National Film Association Awards	2021	Dew the Movie	Best Supporting Actor	Nominated
