= Nawaphat Thannamongkhonsawat =

Thai actor and singer (born 2007)

- นวพรรษ ธนมงคลสวัสดิ์
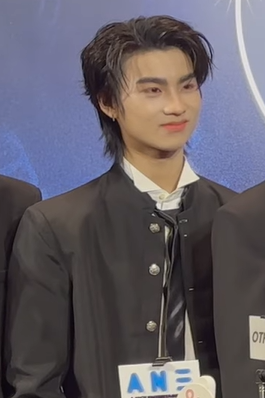
- Nawaphat in 2026
- Born: 1 January 2007 (age 19); Thailand
- Other name: Newyear
- Occupations: Actor; Singer
- Years active: 2022–present
- Agent: Change2561

Nawaphat Thannamongkhonsawat (Thai: นวพรรษ ธนมงคลสวัสดิ์; born 1 January 2007), nicknamed Newyear, is a Thai actor and singer. He is known for portraying King in the BL series Hit Bite Love (2023) and Only Yongchayut in the Thai adaptation of Addicted Heroin (2024). In 2026, he stars in the series The Crow Club, produced by Change2561.

== Career ==
Newyear began his acting career in 2022 with a supporting role in the youth series My First Song. The same year, he appeared as K in the pilot trailer for Jump The Series (กระโดดคว้ารัก), alongside Phudtripart Bhudthonamochai (Ryu).

In 2023, he landed his first leading role as King in the BL series Hit Bite Love, opposite Vasin Traiprakhong (Jur). The role marked his breakthrough and increased his popularity among BL audiences.

Later that year, he starred in the film Firstly Like You, a spin-off set in the same universe as Hit Bite Love. He also participated in LACON: A Thai Fandom Event in Manila, Philippines, alongside the cast of Hit Bite Love.

In 2024, Newyear joined the cast of the Thai adaptation of Addicted Heroin, portraying Only Yongchayut.

Besides acting, he contributed to the series' soundtrack with the song Fly Fly Away, performed alongside August, Mac, and Jur. He also participated in Hit Me Bite Me, one of the official soundtracks for Hit Bite Love.

In 2026, he was announced as one of the lead actors in The Crow Club, portraying Rakkhun opposite Natchanon Supravorawong (Milk).

== Filmography ==
=== Film ===
Year	Title	Role	Notes
2023	Firstly Like You	Burger (Burinphat)	Main role

=== Television ===
Year	Title	Role	Notes
2022	My First Song		Supporting role
2022	The Eclipse	Student	Guest role (Ep. 3)
2023	Hit Bite Love	King	Main role
2024	Addicted Heroin	Only Yongchayut	Supporting role
2026	The Crow Club	Rakkhun	Main role

=== Pilot trailers ===
Year	Title	Role	Notes
2022	Jump The Series	K	Pilot trailer

== Discography ==
=== Soundtrack appearances ===
Year	Title	Artist(s)	Album / Notes
2023	Hit Me Bite Me	Jur, Tae, Newyear, Pure, BigBoss, Vic and Alan	Hit Bite Love OST
2024	Fly Fly Away	August, Mac, Newyear and Jur	Addicted Heroin OST

== Events ==
Year	Event	Venue	Country	Notes
2023	LACON: A Thai Fandom Event	Philippine Trade Training Center, Manila	Philippines	Event featuring the cast of Hit Bite Love held on 8 July 2023.
2024	Addicted Heroin World Premiere	Major Cineplex Sukhumvit, Bangkok	Thailand	World premiere event for Addicted Heroin held on 13 August 2024.

== Awards and nominations ==
Award nominations received by Nawaphat Thannamongkhonsawat
Year	Award	Category	Nominee(s)	Result	Ref.
2024	Kinaree Thong Mahachon Awards	New Rising Actor of the Year	Hit Bite Love	Won	
