= Thanapon Aiemkumchai =

Thai actor and singer (born 1995)

- ธนภณ เอี่ยมกำชัย
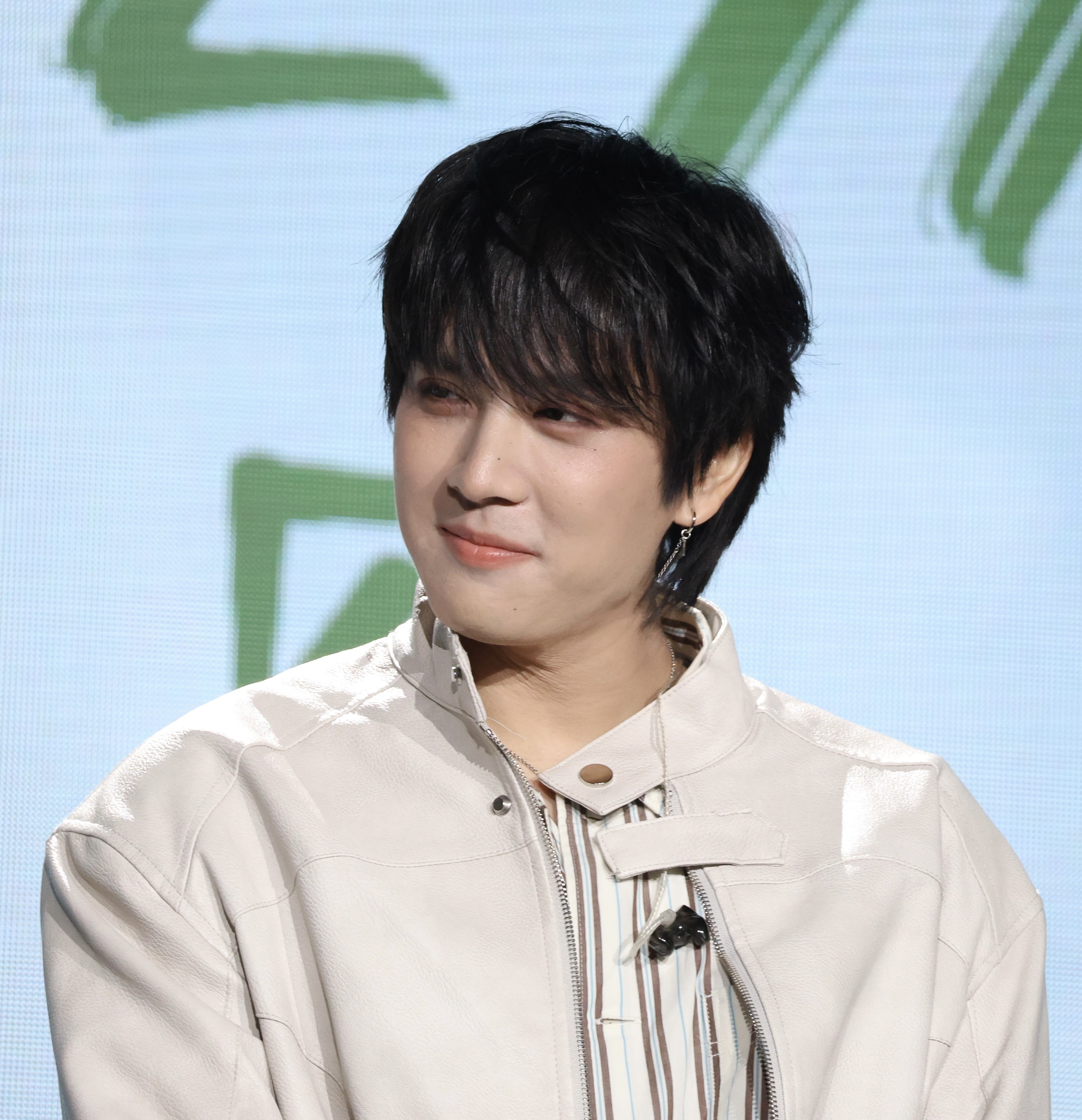
- Thanapon in 2025
- Born: 1 May 1995 (age 31); Thailand
- Other name: Pon
- Education: Thammasat University
- Occupations: Actor; Singer
- Years active: 2016–present
- Agent: Change2561
- Notable work: Bay in The Moment; Jeff in Pit Babe; Plawan in This Love Doesn't Have Long Beans
- Height: 1.75 m (5 ft 9 in)

Thanapon Aiemkumchai (Thai: ธนภณ เอี่ยมกำชัย; born 1 May 1995), nicknamed Pon (Thai: ภณ), is a Thai actor and singer. He is best known for his roles as Bay in The Moment (2020), Jeff in Pit Babe (2023), and Plawan in This Love Doesn't Have Long Beans (2024). In 2026, he stars in the Change2561 series The Crow Club.

== Early life and education ==
Thanapon was born in Thailand on 1 May 1995 to a family of Chinese descent. He graduated with a bachelor's degree from the Faculty of Science and Technology at Thammasat University.

== Career ==
In 2020, Thanapon made his acting debut as Bay, the lead character in the miniseries The Moment, opposite Thanathip Srithongsuk (Bank). Later that year, he reprised the role in the sequel series The Moment Since. He also appeared in a supporting role as Phai in Gen Y.

In January 2022, he released his debut single, Sai Ta Yao (สายตายาว).

In 2023, Thanapon starred as Met in Make a Wish and later joined the cast of Pit Babe, portraying Jeff alongside Hemmawich Kwanamphaiphan (Sailub).

In 2024, he played the lead role of Plawan in This Love Doesn't Have Long Beans, opposite Hemmawich Kwanamphaiphan.

In 2026, he was cast as Sun in The Crown Club, a Boys' Love series produced by Change2561.

== Filmography ==
=== Film ===
Year	Title	Role	Notes
2020	The Message	Pon	Lead role

=== Television ===
Year	Title	Role	Notes	Network
2020	The Moment	Bay	Lead role	Line TV
2020	The Moment Since	Bay	Lead role	Line TV
2020	Gen Y	Phai	Recurring role	Channel 3
2021	Gen Y Season 2	Phai	Recurring role	Channel 3
2023	Make a Wish	Met	Lead role	Viu
2023	Pit Babe	Jeff	Recurring role	One 31
2024	This Love Doesn't Have Long Beans	Plawan	Lead role	One 31
2025	Pit Babe 2	Jeff	Recurring role	One 31
2026	The Crown Club	Sun	Lead role	TBA

== Discography ==
=== Singles ===
Year	Title	Notes
2022	Sai Ta Yao (สายตายาว)	Debut single

== Awards and nominations ==
Year	Award	Category	Work	Result
2024	Y Universe Awards	Cutest Artist Award	Pit Babe	Nominated
2025	Thailand Box Office Awards 2024	Best Couple of the Year (with Hemmawich Kwanamphaiphan)	This Love Doesn't Have Long Beans	Nominated
