= Phachara Thanakulwuttiporn =

Thai actor (born 2002)

- พชร ธนากูลวุฒิพร
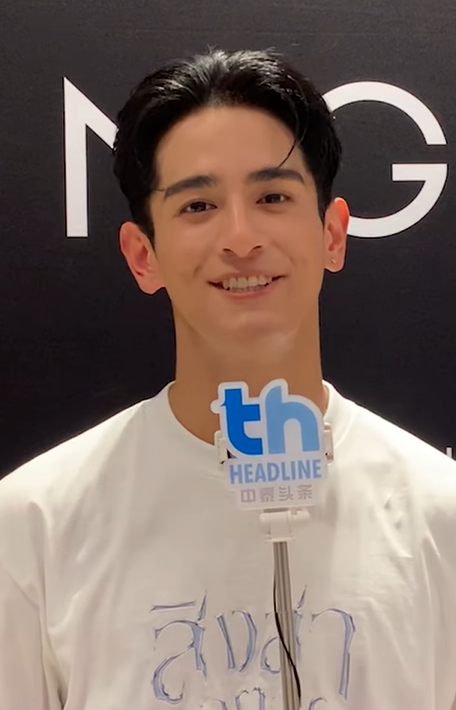
- Phachara in 2025
- Born: Phachara Thanakulwuttiporn; 11 March 2002 (age 24); Thailand
- Other name: Otto
- Education: King Mongkut's University of Technology Thonburi
- Occupation: Actor
- Years active: 2020–present
- Agent: Change2561
- Known for: Khainui in My Coach; King in Goddess Bless You From Death; Taengmo in The Crow Club

Phachara Thanakulwuttiporn (Thai: พชร ธนากูลวุฒิพร; born 11 March 2002), nicknamed Otto (Thai: อ๊อตโต้), is a Thai actor. He began his entertainment career in 2019 by participating in I Can See Your Voice Thailand, and in 2020 took part in the reality show The Brothers (2020) on Channel 3. He became better known for his roles in the series My Coach (2022) on Viu, Something in the Wind (2023) on Channel 7, and Goddess Bless You From Death (2025) on One31. In 2026, he stars in the series The Crow Club on One31 and Netflix.

== Biography and career ==
Phachara was born in Thailand. He studied civil engineering at King Mongkut's University of Technology Thonburi. In 2019, Otto entered the entertainment industry by participating in the program I Can See Your Voice Thailand on Workpoint TV. The following year, he joined the reality show The Brothers: School of Gentlemen on Channel 3, after auditioning for the second season of The Face Men Thailand.

In 2022, he made his acting debut in the series My Coach, portraying Khainui on Viu. The following year, he appeared in Something in the Wind on Channel 7. In 2025, he portrayed Inspector King Wachira Khongthamphiphat in the suspense series Goddess Bless You from Death, broadcast on One31 and iQIYI. In 2026, he was cast as Taengmo, one of the lead characters in the series The Crow Club, which will air on One31 and Netflix.

== Filmography ==
=== Television ===
Year	Title	Role	Network / Platform	Notes
2022	My Coach	Khainui	Viu	Supporting role
2023	Something in the Wind (ลมพัดผ่านดาว)	Kaen	Channel 7	Supporting role
2025	Goddess Bless You from Death	Captain King Wachira Khongthamphiphat	One31 / iQIYI	Supporting role
2026	The Crow Club	Taengmo	One31 / Netflix / oneD	Lead role

=== Television shows ===
Year	Title	Network	Notes
2019	I Can See Your Voice Thailand	Workpoint TV	Participant
2020	The Brothers: School of Gentlemen	Channel 3	Participant

=== Fan meetings ===
Year	Date	Event	Country/Region	Venue	Ref.
2025	31 October	Goddess Bless You From The Death First Premiere	Thailand	Siam Pavalai Royal Grand Theatre	
2025	28 November	Goddess Bless You From The Death EP.5 Screening	Thailand	Siam Pavalai Royal Grand Theatre	
2026	30 January	Goddess Bless You From The Death Final EP. Fan Meeting	Thailand	Siam Pavalai Royal Grand Theatre	
2026	7 February	Goddess Bless You From The Death Fan Meeting	Macau	Macau Tower Convention and Entertainment Centre – Exhibition Hall (2nd Floor)	
2026	28 March	Goddess Bless You From The Death Fan Meeting	Singapore	GV Max, VivoCity	
