= Goddess Bless You From Death =

2025 Thai television series

- Official poster
- สิงสาลาตาย
- Genre: Romantic drama; Suspense; Boys' love
- Written by: Kanokphan Ornrattanasakul; Issaraporn Kuntisuk; Sorawit Muangkaew; Nivaruj Teekapowan; Irene Insot
- Directed by: Nopachai Jayanama
- Country of origin: Thailand
- Original language: Thai
- No. of episodes: 13

Production
- Executive producers: Saithip Montrikul Na Audhaya; Vorarit Vijairanai
- Running time: 50 minutes
- Production company: Change2561

Original release
- Network: One31; iQIYI
- Release: 31 October 2025 – 30 January 2026

Goddess Bless You From Death (Thai: สิงสาลาตาย) is a 2025 Thai boys' love romantic drama television series produced by Change2561 and directed by Nopachai Chaiyanam. Starring Naret Promphaopun (Pavel) and Krittin Kitjaruwannakul (Pooh). The series aired from 31 October 2025 to 26 January 2026, every Friday at 22:30 ICT on One31. The uncut version was made available at 23:15 ICT on iQIYI.

== Synopsis ==
Seven bodies are found hanging, with their eyes and mouths sewn shut, in an abandoned mall. Thup, an orphan raised in a temple who claims to be able to see ghosts, is initially suspected after being found on the scene. Inspector Singha and his team soon learn they are dealing with a case of serial murders occurring in different parts of Thailand every five years. Since the case appears to be linked to witchcraft, Thup is hired as an unofficial spiritual advisor.

== Cast ==
=== Main ===
- Naret Promphaopun (Pavel) as Singha Wetarak (Sing), a rational captain of the special investigation unit
- Krittin Kitjaruwannakul (Pooh) as Thamawat Santasakol (Thup), a 25-year old temple orphan with supernatural senses

=== Supporting ===
- Kiettisak Vatanavitsakul (Michael) as Phithaya Thanthararom (Sey), a forensic physician
- Supakorn Saokhor (Topten) as Darin Phandaraphrai, a forensic physician
- Asre Watthanayakul (Lee) as Mekha Jitsuphang (Mek), captain of the special investigation unit
- Phachara Thanakulwuttiporn (Otto) as Wachira Kongthamphiphat (King), lieutenant colonel of the special investigation unit and Singha's ex
- Apichai Tragoolpadetgrai (Lek) as Aisun, head of Santi Tham House
- Bhurith Ploymeeka (Phe) as Kem, a policeman of the special investigation unit
- Kasama Khamtanit (Aon) as Song Songsin, a YouTuber
- Pornpawee Upatum (June) as Dear Rotsorn, a YouTuber
- Tanawat Hudchaleelaha (Tiger) as Jump Thitiphon, a YouTuber
- Chatchawit Techarukpong (Victor) as Bom Santi, a YouTuber

=== Guest ===
- Tassawan Seneewongse as Singha's mother
- Surapol Poonpiriya (Alex) as Pong Kongthamphiphat, a high-ranking police official and King's father
- Sathaporn Nakvilairote as Yuth, commander of the special investigation unit

== Production ==
The series is produced by Change2561 and adapts MTRD.S's same-name novel. It sees Naret Promphaopun (Pavel) and Krittin Kitjaruwannakul (Pooh) reunite after acting together in Pit Babe and its sequel. The original work was popular online and on social media, and the scriptwriter, upon seeing fans requesting for Promphaopun and Kitjaruwannakul to star in it, presented the idea to Change2561 CEO Saithip Montrikul Na Ayudhaya.

A pilot trailer was released on 25 April 2024. A blessing ceremony was held on 29 May 2025 at Wat Chulamanee temple in Samut Songkhram ahead of filming, which started in the summer. To prepare for their roles, Kitjaruwannakul worked as a temple boy, experiencing the life of a monk firsthand, while the rest of the cast attended a workshop with the Metropolitan Police Investigation Bureau.

== Reception ==
Goddess Bless You From Death was described as "a fresh take on the boys' love (BL) genre that delivers a perfect blend of horror and investigative mystery." According to Feed For Future, the seamless and compelling blend of romance, mystery, investigation, and horror "creates a series with a rich, multifaceted tone that evokes a wide range of emotions—from the intricacies of character relationships and the suspense of solving cases to the gradual unraveling of mysteries." The performances of the two main leads were praised for their growth.

=== Accolades ===
Award ceremony, year, category, nominee/work and result
Award	Year	Category	Nominee/work	Result	Ref.
Bangkok Pride Awards	2026	Pride Popular of Series/Drama (BL)	Goddess Bless You from Death	Nominated	
Bangkok Pride Awards	2026	Pride Popular of Y Series Star	Krittin Kitjaruwannakul and Naret Promphaopun	Nominated	
Feed x Khaosod Awards	2026	Popular Series/Drama Award	Goddess Bless You from Death	Nominated	
Feed x Khaosod Awards	2026	Popular Male Actor	Krittin Kitjaruwannakul	Won	
Feed x Khaosod Awards	2026	Best Chemistry (Popular Vote)	Krittin Kitjaruwannakul and Naret Promphaopun	Won	
Feed x Khaosod Awards	2026	Top-Tier BL Series of the Year	Goddess Bless You from Death	Nominated	
Feed x Khaosod Awards	2026	Boys' Love/Girls' Love Series Director of the Year	Nopachai Jayanama	Nominated	
Feed x Khaosod Awards	2026	Boys' Love Actor of the Year	Krittin Kitjaruwannakul	Nominated	
Global Empower Awards	2026	Best Series Boy Love Award	Goddess Bless You from Death	Won	
Global Empower Awards	2026	Best Viral BL Couple Award	Krittin Kitjaruwannakul and Naret Promphaopun	Won	
Howe Awards	2026	Hottest Actor Award	Naret Promphaopun	Won	
Kazz Awards	2026	Series of the Year	Goddess Bless You from Death	Nominated	
Kazz Awards	2026	Couple of the Year	Krittin Kitjaruwannakul and Naret Promphaopun	Nominated	
Kazz Awards	2026	Outstanding Actor of the Year	Krittin Kitjaruwannakul	Won	
Kazz Awards	2026	Outstanding Actor of the Year	Naret Promphaopun	Won	
Kinnaree Public Awards	2026	Popular Drama Award	Goddess Bless You from Death	Won	
Kinnaree Public Awards	2026	Popular Leading Actor Award	Krittin Kitjaruwannakul and Naret Promphaopun	Won	
Kom Chad Luek Awards	2026	Popular Actor	Naret Promphaopun	Won	
Nataraja Awards	2026	Best Drama	Goddess Bless You from Death	Nominated	
Nataraja Awards	2026	Best Screenplay	Goddess Bless You from Death	Nominated	
Nataraja Awards	2026	Best Director	Nopachai Jayanama	Nominated	
Nataraja Awards	2026	Best Art Direction	Goddess Bless You from Death	Nominated	
Nataraja Awards	2026	Best Cinematography	Goddess Bless You from Death	Nominated	
Thailand Y Content Awards	2025	Best Series	Goddess Bless You from Death	Nominated	
Thailand Y Content Awards	2025	Best Special Effects	Goddess Bless You from Death	Nominated	
Thailand Y Content Awards	2025	Best Cinematography	Goddess Bless You from Death	Won	
Thailand Y Content Awards	2025	Best Production Design	Goddess Bless You from Death	Nominated	
Thailand Y Content Awards	2025	Best Director	Nopachai Jayanama	Nominated	
Thailand Y Content Awards	2025	Best Leading Actor	Naret Promphaopun	Nominated	
Thailand Y Content Awards	2025	Best Series Soundtrack	"Pray"	Nominated	
The Viral Hits Awards	2025	Best BL Series of the Year	Goddess Bless You from Death	Nominated	
The Viral Hits Awards	2025	Best BL Couple of the Year	Krittin Kitjaruwannakul and Naret Promphaopun	Nominated	
The Viral Hits Awards	2025	Best BL Actor of the Year	Krittin Kitjaruwannakul	Nominated	
Y Entertain Awards	2025	Prince of Boys' Love	Krittin Kitjaruwannakul	Nominated	
Y Entertain Awards	2025	Y Couple of the Year	Krittin Kitjaruwannakul and Naret Promphaopun	Nominated	
Y Entertain Awards	2026	Best Y Series Director of the Year	Nopachai Jayanama	Won	
Y Entertain Awards	2026	Y Star on Spotlight of the Year	Phachara Thanakulwuttiporn	Nominated	
Y Entertain Awards	2026	Best BL Series of the Year	Goddess Bless You From Death	Nominated	
Y Entertain Awards	2026	Best Creative Team of the Year	Goddess Bless You From Death	Nominated	
Y Universe Awards	2024	The Best Coming Soon	Goddess Bless You From Death	Nominated	
Y Universe Awards	2024	Best Noticeable	Goddess Bless You From Death	Nominated	
Y Universe Awards	2025	The Best Coming Soon	Goddess Bless You From Death	Nominated	
