= Atthanin Thaninpanuvivat =

Thai actor (born 1998)

- ธนินภาณุวิวัฒน์
- Born: Atthanin Thaninpanuvivat; 4 September 1998 (age 28); Thailand
- Other names: Benz, Benzalert
- Occupations: Actor and singer

Atthanin Thaninpanuvivat (Thai: อัทธ์ธนิน ธนินภาณุวิวัฒน์; born 4 September 1998), nicknamed Benz (Thai: เบ้นซ์), is a Thai actor and singer. He is known for his roles in the series En of Love: Love Mechanics, Pit Babe, This Love Doesn't Have Long Beans and Pit Babe 2.

== Career ==
In 2020, he starred in the BL series En of Love: Love Mechanics. In 2023, Atthanin joined the agency CHANGE2561 and was cast to play Kim in the series Pit Babe. In 2024, he played Methas in This Love Doesn't Have Long Beans and reprised his role as Kim in Pit Babe 2. In 2026, Change announced the end of the BenzGarfield ship, ending the partnership between Benz and Pantach Kankham (Garfield) after three series together.

== Filmography ==
=== Television ===
Year	Title	Role	Network / Platform	Notes
2019	Theory of Love	Student	LINE TV; GMM 25	Special appearance
2020	En of Love: Love Mechanics	Praram / Pralak	LINE TV	Main role
2023	Pit Babe	Kim	One 31 iQIYI	Supporting role
2024	This Love Doesn't Have Long Beans	Methas	One 31 iQIYI	Supporting role
2024	Club Friday 16: Hot Love Issue	Ai	One 31	Main role
2025	Pit Babe 2	Kim	One 31 iQIYI	Supporting role
2026	I Wanna Be Sup'tar	Tom	GMM 25; Viu	Supporting role

== Live performances ==
=== Fan meetings ===
Year	Date	Fan Meeting Name	Country/Region	Venue	Ref.
2023	May 22	Pit Babe Soft Fan Meeting	Thailand	Royal Paragon	
2023	November 17	Pit Babe Series Premiere	Thailand	Siam Pavalai Royal Grand Theatre	
2024	February 9	Pit Babe Final Episode Fan Meeting	Thailand	Siam Pavalai Royal Grand Theatre	
2024	March 2–3	Pit Babe 1st Fan Meeting – Love's Journey	Thailand	ICONSIAM Hall	
2024	March 16	Pit Babe 1st Fan Meeting Love's Journey Asia Tour	Hong Kong	Ocean Park – Yee King Fong	
2024	April 7	Pit Babe 1st Fan Meeting Love's Journey Asia Tour	Japan	Japan Fire Department Hall	
2024	May 11	Pit Babe 1st Fan Meeting Love's Journey Asia Tour	Seoul (South Korea)	Baekam Art Hall	
2024	May 19	Pit Babe 1st Fan Meeting Love's Journey Asia Tour	Taiwan	Legacy MAX (Xinyi Theater)	
2024	June 8	Pit Babe 1st Fan Meeting Love's Journey Asia Tour	Vietnam	Hoa Binh Theater	
2024	June 22	Pit Babe 1st Fan Meeting Love's Journey Asia Tour	Philippines	SM North EDSA	
2024	July 5	"This Love Doesn't Have Long Beans" Premiere	Thailand	Siam Pavalai Royal Grand Theatre	
2024	July 14	Pit Babe 1st Fan Meeting Love's Journey Asia Tour	Macau	Broadway Theater	
2024	August 17	Pit Babe 1st Fan Meeting – Love's Journey	Brazil	Terra SP	
2024	August 23	"This Love Doesn't Have Long Beans" Final Episode Fan Meeting	Thailand	Siam Pavalai Royal Grand Theatre	
2024	September 8	Pit Babe 1st Fan Meeting Love's Journey Asia Tour	Cambodia	Naba Theatre	
2024	October 17	Pit Babe The Movie	Thailand	Siam Pavalai Royal Grand Theatre	—
2024	November 17	Pit Babe 1st Anniversary 'Level Up' Fan Meeting	Thailand	ICONSIAM Hall	
2024	November 23	Sailub Pon Benz Garfield 1st Fan Meeting	Philippines	Teatrino Greenhills	
2025	January 11	Sailub Pon Benz Garfield 1st Fan Meeting	Taiwan	Hua Yang Exhibition Space	
2025	February 15	Dream Date with Tua Fak Yao the Gang	Cambodia	Naba Theatre	—
2025	February 23	Sailub Pon Benz Garfield 1st Fan Meeting	Macau	G Box	—
2025	May 2	Pit Babe 2 Premiere	Thailand	Siam Pavalai Royal Grand Theatre	
2025	July 25	Pit Babe 2 Final Episode Fan Meeting	Thailand	Siam Pavalai Royal Grand Theatre	
2025	August 3	Pit Babe 2 Level Up Fan Meeting Tour	Hong Kong	Sheraton Hong Kong Tung Chung	
2025	August 9	Pit Babe 2 Level Up Fan Meeting Tour	Vietnam	Cultural Peace Center – District 10	—
2025	August 23	Pit Babe 2 Level Up Fan Meeting Tour	Japan	Tempo Harbor Theater	
2025	September 6	Pit Babe 2 Level Up Fan Meeting Tour	Philippines	UP Theater	
2025	September 20	Pit Babe 2 Level Up Fan Meeting Tour	Macau	H853 Entertainment Hall – The Lisboeta	—
2025	October 2	Pit Babe 2 Level Up Fan Meeting Tour	Mexico	Circo Volador	—
2025	October 5	Pit Babe 2 Level Up Fan Meeting Tour	Brazil	Terra SP	
