= Unlucky Bae =

2026 Thai television series

- Official series poster
- Thai: จุดจีบสายมู
- Genre: Boys' love; Romantic comedy
- Based on: Chut Chop Sai Mu (จุดจบสายมู) by LuaAiMei
- Screenplay by: Apirak Chaipanha; Aekawitch Longcharoen; Thanadol Sinchiewchan
- Directed by: Apirak Chaipanha; Anan Rasamee
- Starring: Tupthong Suwanrakanont; Nattapat Nimjirawat
- Opening theme: "Beyond Luck (รักไม่วัดดวง)" by Tham Tupthong and Mac Nattapat
- Ending theme: "Beyond Luck (รักไม่วัดดวง)" by Tham Tupthong and Mac Nattapat
- Country of origin: Thailand
- Original language: Thai
- No. of episodes: 10

Production
- Executive producers: Sataporn Panichraksapong; Darapa Choeysanguan
- Producers: Apirak Chaipanha; Rabob Pokanngaen; Noppharnach Chaiyahwimhon
- Cinematography: Peeraset Keereeneramit
- Running time: 46–61 minutes
- Production companies: GMMTV; Yolo Production

Original release
- Network: GMM 25; Netflix
- Release: 6 August – 8 October 2026

Unlucky Bae (Thai: จุดจีบสายมู; RTGS: Chut Chip Sai Mu) is a 2026 Thai boys' love television series starring Tupthong Suwanrakanont (Tham) and Nattapat Nimjirawat (Mac), adapted from the novel of the same name. Produced by GMMTV and Yolo Production, the series was announced during the GMMTV 2026: Magic Vibes Maximized event in November 2025.

The series premiered on GMM 25 on 6 August 2026, airing every Thursday at 20:30 ICT, and was made available for streaming on Netflix at 21:30 ICT.

== Synopsis ==
Rin (Nattapat Nimjirawat), a cool and stylish young man from a family obsessed with superstition, has been trying to escape it all his life. That is until he sees his beloved ex-boyfriend Krit (Napat Patcharachavalit) dating someone new. That night, he drinks heavily and accidentally uses Krit's pen in a curse ritual.

After the ritual, Rin realises the pen actually belongs to Khobfa (Tupthong Suwanrakanont), a handsome business administration student and friend of Krit. The curse takes effect, threatening to ruin Khobfa's life, but Rin finds himself drawn to Khobfa in order to protect him. But what kind of protection involves falling for each other? And what will Rin do if Khobfa and Krit ever find out what he really intended to do that night?

== Cast ==
=== Main ===
- Tupthong Suwanrakanont (Tham) as Khobfa Chaipanha
- Nattapat Nimjirawat (Mac) as Darin (Rin)

=== Supporting ===
- Napat Patcharachavalit (Aun) as Kritchaphat Iamchaisree (Krit)
- Panachkorn Rueksiriaree (Stamp) as Mochi
- Nutnicha Sangmanee (Pream) as Jinnie
- Tiranat Kittisattho (Juno) as Ohm
- Namassakarn Trangkhasombat (Lighty) as Danthai (Dan)
- Tuangtip Nanakorn (Dear) as Daran (Khobfa's mother)

== Original soundtrack ==
Unlucky Bae Soundtrack
No.	Title	Writer(s)	Artist	Length
1.	"Beyond Luck (รักไม่วัดดวง)"	Peerapon Iamjamrat (Three Man Down); Jason Sotangkur	Tham Tupthong; Mac Nattapat	3:19
2.	"Just Like That (เฉยเลย)"	Do Thanakorn	Mac Nattapat	3:34
3.	"Unlucky Man (โชคดีในโชคร้าย)"	Do Thanakorn	Tham Tupthong	3:22

== Production ==
The series was officially unveiled during the GMMTV 2026: Magic Vibes Maximized event through the release of its pilot trailer on 25 November 2025. The pilot trailer has accumulated more than 560,000 views on YouTube.

The series is directed by Apirak Chaipanha and Anan Rasamee, while the screenplay is written by Aekawitch Longcharoen. A script reading with the cast took place on 1 March 2026. On 21 May 2026, the program GMMTV Live House aired a special feature from the filming set, showcasing behind-the-scenes footage and interviews with lead actors Tupthong Suwanrakanont and Nattapat Nimjirawat.
