= Hit Bite Love =

2023 Thai television series

- Thai: รักชอบเจ็บ
- Literally: Hit Bite Love
- Genre: Romantic drama; Boys' love; Mystery
- Written by: Chim Sedthawut Inboon; Poy Orachat Brahmasreni
- Directed by: Yuan Tin Tun Danop (Yuan)
- Starring: Alan Campana; Bigboss Woraphon Charoensuk; Pure Napolpong Sooksombut; Newyear Nawaphat Thannamongkhonsawat; Jur Vasin Traiprakhong; Vic Vittawin Panichtamrong; Tae Natthapat Meesuk
- Country of origin: Thailand
- Original language: Thai
- No. of episodes: 6

Production
- Producer: Napat Worakitpunya
- Running time: 52 minutes
- Production company: Jinloe Media Work

Original release
- Network: Amarin TV 34 HD
- Release: 21 January – 25 February 2023

Hit Bite Love (Thai: รักชอบเจ็บ) is a 2023 Thai television series in the romantic drama, mystery and boys' love (BL) genres, directed by Yuan Tin Tun Danop and produced by Jinloe Media Work. The series aired from 21 January to 25 February 2023, with weekly episodes on Saturdays on Amarin TV 34 HD .

The series consists of three interconnected standalone stories exploring different aspects of teenage love and relationships: "Love vs Make Love", "Like vs Be Liked" and "Hurt vs Hell".

== Synopsis ==
The series follows three teenage couples at a Thai school:

Love vs Make Love: Ken (Pure Napolpong) and Shokun (Bigboss Woraphon) are in a secret relationship. Ken wants to keep it hidden, but Shokun, tired of being someone's secret, ends the relationship and starts dating Matteo (Alan Campana), the student council president. Matteo prefers BDSM, while Shokun has more traditional preferences, creating conflict between them.

Like vs Be Liked: Burger (Jur Vasin) is the new student at school. He sits next to King (Newyear Nawaphat), the theater club president. Due to a misunderstanding, King starts to believe that Burger is interested in him and begins pursuing him, leading to a series of embarrassing situations.

Hurt vs Hell: Hida (Vic Vittawin) and Saint (Tae Natthapat) become brothers after their parents marry. Despite not being blood related, they develop a deep bond. When Saint starts dating Pin, Hida feels left out and hurt, doing everything he can to break them up.

All the stories are connected by a police investigation into a student's death, which is revealed throughout the episodes.

== Cast ==
=== Main ===
- Alan Campana as Matteo
- Bigboss Woraphon Charoensuk (Bigboss) as Shokun
- Pure Napolpong Sooksombut (Pure) as Ken
- Nawaphat Thannamongkhonsawat (Newyear) as King
- Vasin Traiprakhong (Jur) as Burger (Burinphat)
- Vic Vittawin Panichtamrong (Vic) as Hida
- Tae Natthapat Meesuk (Tae) as Saint

=== Supporting ===
- Ning Chutima Maholakul (Ning) as Pimtha
- Mint Kittiyapron Fungmee (Mint) as Fern
- Art Pakpoom Juanchainat (Art) as Petch (teacher)
- Ohm Chetnipat Lohagarog (Ohm) as Long Lee
- Bookko Thanatchaphan Buranachiwawilai (Bookko) as Jacqueline (teacher)
- Goove Jirayus Sarika (Goove)

=== Guest ===
- Link Thanawee Phongphasawat (Link) as police officer (Ep. 1-3, 6)
- Tang-oh Natthavat Trisomboon (Tang-oh) as police officer (Ep. 1-3, 6)
- Nut Nattapong Prompinit (Nut) as PE instructor (Ep. 1)
- Beam Atichart Lawansathian (Beam) as Chao Khun (Ep. 3, 5-6)
- Grain Attaphun Katkaew (Grain) as Yang

== Production ==
The series was directed by Yuan Tin Tun Danop (Yuan), known for his work on Love Sick 2 (2015) and Make It Right: The Series (2016). Production was handled by Jinloe Media Work, the same company behind What the Duck (2018).

The series was rated for viewers aged 18 and over due to adult content, including scenes of violence and references to BDSM.

The cast includes several debutant actors, with this being their first acting experience.

== Release and reception ==
The series premiered on 21 January 2023 on Amarin TV 34 HD, airing weekly on Saturdays at 10:30 p.m. (local time). It was also made available on Jinloe's official YouTube channel.

Critical reception was mixed. The Mexican site Diverso criticized the approach to BDSM themes and the confusing narrative structure, pointing out that the police investigation plot was not well developed. On the other hand, a review from The BL Xpress highlighted the chemistry between the actors and the portrayal of communication difficulties between couples.

== Awards and nominations ==
Year	Award	Category	Nominee	Result	Ref.
2024	Kinaree Thong Mahachon Awards	Best Rising Actor (นักแสดงดาวรุ่งรุ่นใหม่แห่งปี)	Jur Vasin Traiprakhong (Jur)	Won	
2024	Kinaree Thong Mahachon Awards	Best Rising Actor (นักแสดงดาวรุ่งรุ่นใหม่แห่งปี)	Newyear Nawaphat Thannamongkhonsawat (Newyear)	Won	
2024	Kinaree Thong Mahachon Awards	Best Rising Director	Yuan Tin Tun Danop	Won	
