= Hometown Romance =

2026 Thai television series

- Official series poster
- Thai: คุณแฟนบ้านนอก
- Genre: Girls' love; Romantic comedy
- Screenplay by: Siwarat Harnpanich
- Directed by: Pantip Vibultham
- Starring: Saranphat Pedersen; Punyapat Wangpongsathaporn
- Opening theme: "อย่า อย่า อย่า (Don't Touch)" by Saranphat Pedersen and Punyapat Wangpongsathaporn
- Composer: Klom Orave Pinijsarapirom
- Country of origin: Thailand
- Original language: Thai
- No. of episodes: 8

Production
- Executive producers: Saithip Montrikun Na Ayudhaya; Vorarit Vaijairanai
- Cinematography: Somkiat Saengthong
- Production company: Change2561

Original release
- Network: ONE31
- Release: 3 April – 22 May 2026

Hometown Romance (Thai: คุณแฟนบ้านนอก; RTGS: Khun Faen Ban Nok) is a 2026 Thai girls' love television series starring Saranphat Pedersen (Sonya) and Punyapat Wangpongsathaporn (Lookmhee), in their third project together after Affair and Harmony Secret. Directed by Pantip Vibultham (Bo), and produced by Change2561, it premiered on ONE31 on 3 April 2026, and ran until 22 May 2026, for a total of 8 episodes. It was also made available for streaming on OneD App and iQIYI.

The series won Popular Series/Drama Award at the FEEDxKaosod Awards 2026.

== Synopsis ==
Si, a spoiled high-society heiress, insists on helping the family negotiate a deal to renew the lease of their family mall's land, to prove herself as worthy of becoming the next CEO of their family business. In a turn of events, the landowner, Klao, a country farmer who favours the simple, rural lifestyle and fertiliser shirts, proposes a deal to renew their lease for 30 years, in exchange for Si's hand in marriage.

== Cast and characters ==
=== Main ===
- Saranphat Pedersen (Sonya) as Si, a spoiled high-society heiress who faces an impossible decision to marry a farmer whom she shares nothing in common with, or risk losing billions in the family business.
- Punyapat Wangpongsathaporn (Lookmhee) as Klao, a wealthy rural farmer who holds the deed to the prime land that Si's family mall is built on.

=== Supporting ===
- Thanyares Chamnan (Aim) as Song, Si's younger sister who is set to become the new CEO of the family business.
- Narupornkamol Chaisangborn (Praew) as Jane, Si's ex.
- Boy Pisanu Chutanimsakul as Si's father
- Supaksorn Ruengsomboon (Kratae) as Si's mother
- Supanut Satpan (Bossu) as Jiu, a village boy who helps Klao around the farm.

=== Guest ===
- Jiratchaya Kittavornsakul (Belle) as Tookta, Klao's neighbour.

== Original soundtrack ==
Hometown Romance Soundtrack
No.	Title	Writer(s)	Artist	Length
1.	"อย่า อย่า อย่า (Don't Touch)"	Okomo P	Lookmhee Punyapat; Sonya Saranphat	4:06
2.	"ดีพอกับใจ (Just Right)"	Okomo P	Lookmhee Punyapat; Sonya Saranphat	3:43

== Nominations ==
Year	Award	Category	Artist	Results
2026	FEED x KAOSOD Awards 2026	Most Popular Series/Drama	Hometown Romance	Won
