= Hemmawich Kwanamphaiphan =

Thai actor and singer (born 1993)

Sailub Hemmawich
- เหมวิช ขวัญอำไพพันธุ์
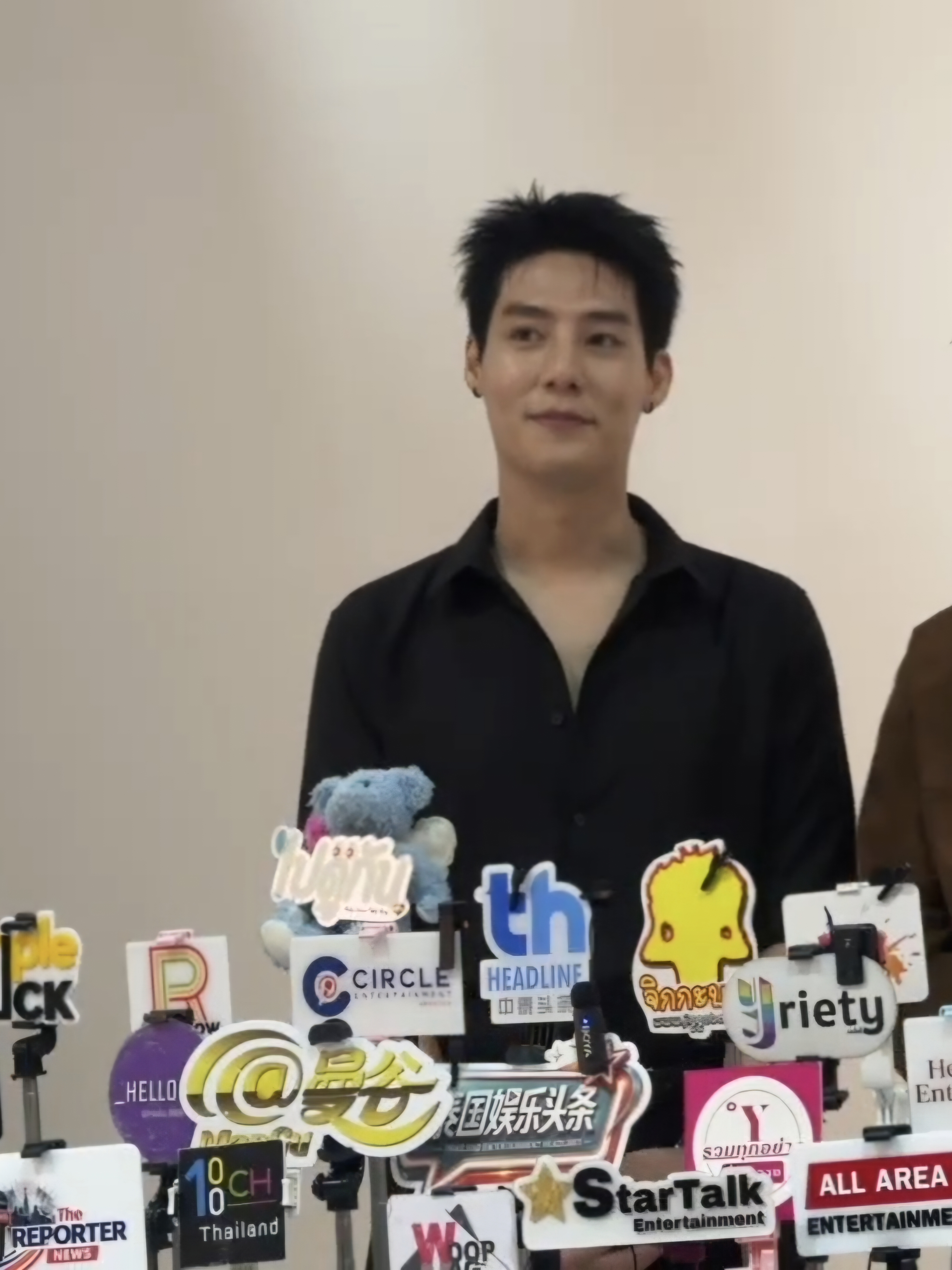
- Sailub in July 2026
- Born: Weerachai Kwanamphaiphan; 12 August 1993 (age 33); Thailand
- Other name: Sailub
- Education: Ramkhamhaeng University (Political Science)
- Occupations: Actor; Singer
- Years active: 2014–present
- Agent: Change2561
- Height: 183 cm (6 ft 0 in)

Sailub Hemmawich (Thai: เหมวิช ขวัญอำไพพันธุ์; born 12 August 1993), formerly Weerachai Kwanamphaiphan (Thai: วีรชัย ขวัญอำไพพันธุ์), is a Thai actor and singer. He is best known for his roles as Art in Club Friday 13: Love Seasons Celebration, Alan in the Pit Babe franchise, and Oab in This Love Doesn't Have Long Beans. In 2026, he stars in the Change2561 series The Crow Club.

== Early life ==
Sailub was born in Thailand as Weerachai Kwanamphaiphan. He graduated from Ramkhamhaeng University with a degree in political science. His hobbies include cooking, horseback riding, and motocross.

== Career ==
Sailub began his acting career in Thai television productions during the 2010s. In 2021, he received his first leading role, portraying Art in Club Friday 13: Love Seasons Celebration.

In 2023, he gained wider recognition after joining the main cast of the BL series Pit Babe, a Change2561 production based on a popular web novel. He portrayed Alan, a character who later returned in subsequent installments of the franchise.

In 2024, he starred in his first BL series as a leading actor alongside Thanapon Aiemkumchai (Pon) in This Love Doesn't Have Long Beans.

Besides acting, Sailub also contributed to the soundtrack of Pit Babe. In 2024, he released the single "Told Ya" together with Thanapon Aiemkumchai.

In March 2026, Change2561 announced legal action against social media accounts accused of publishing defamatory content about the actor.

== Filmography ==
=== Television ===
Year	Title	Role	Network / Platform	Notes
2014	Ruen Rissaya	Thi	Channel 8	Supporting role
2019	Plai Chawak	Sin	Channel 8	Leading role
2021	Club Friday 13: Love Seasons Celebration	Art	One 31	Leading role
2022	Chom Chod	Tham	Channel 7	Supporting role
2022	Dong Dok Mai	Hatsadin	One 31	Supporting role
2023	Wongsakanayat	Jo	One 31	Supporting role
2023	Pit Babe	Alan	One 31 / iQIYI	Supporting role
2024	This Love Doesn't Have Long Beans	Oab	One 31 / iQIYI / Netflix	Leading role
2025	Club Friday Theory of Love	Jump	One 31	Leading role
2025	Pit Babe 2	Alan	One 31 / iQIYI	Leading role
2025	Maya	Indy	—	Supporting role
2026	The Crow Club	Talay	—	Leading role

== Discography ==
=== Singles ===
Year	Title	Artist(s)	Album
2024	Told Ya (บอกแล้ว...คบก็จบ)	Sailub Hemmawich and Thanapon Aiemkumchai	Pit Babe OST

== Awards and nominations ==
Year	Award	Category	Work	Result
2025	Thailand Box Office Awards 2024	Best Couple of the Year (Series)	This Love Doesn't Have Long Beans (with Thanapon Aiemkumchai)	Nominated

== Fan meetings and events ==
Year	Event	Location	Country	Notes
2024	Pit Babe Asia Tour 1st Fan Meeting: Love's Journey in Brazil	Terra SP, São Paulo	Brazil	Held on 17 August 2024 as part of the international tour for Pit Babe.
2024	This Love Doesn't Have Long Beans Final EP. Fan Meeting	Siam Pavalai Royal Grand Theatre, Bangkok	Thailand	Final episode screening and cast event held on 23 August 2024.
2024	Sailub Pon Benz Garfield 1st Fan Meeting in Manila	Teatrino Greenhills, Manila	Philippines	Held on 23 November 2024.
2025	Sailub Pon Benz Garfield 1st Fan Meeting in Taipei	Taipei	Taiwan	Held on 11 January 2025.
2025	Pit Babe 2 Level Up Fan Meeting	Terra SP, São Paulo	Brazil	Promotional event for the second season of Pit Babe, held on 5 October 2025.
