= Addicted Heroin =

2024 Thai television series

- Thai: รักร้าย นายเสพติด
- Literally: Addicted Heroin
- Genre: Romantic drama; Boys' love
- Directed by: Tin Tun Danop
- Starring: Vachiravit Paisarnkulwong; Nattapat Nimjirawat; Vasin Traiprakhong; Nawaphat Thannamongkhonsawat
- Country of origin: Thailand
- Original language: Thai
- No. of episodes: 10

Production
- Running time: 46 minutes
- Production companies: Golden Dog Thailand; Hollywood (Thailand); HJ Thailand (Hollywood Jinloe)

Original release
- Network: WeTV
- Release: 13 August – 15 October 2024

Addicted Heroin (Thai: รักร้าย นายเสพติด) is a 2024 Thai television series in the romantic drama and boys' love (BL) genres. It was directed by Tin Tun Danop (Yuan) and produced by Golden Dog Thailand, Hollywood (Thailand) and HJ Thailand (Hollywood Jinloe). The series stars Vachiravit Paisarnkulwong (August) and Nattapat Nimjirawat (Mac) in the lead roles, with Vasin Traiprakhong (Jur) and Nawaphat Thannamongkhonsawat (Newyear) in supporting roles.

The series is a remake of the 2016 Chinese series Addicted. It aired from 13 August to 15 October 2024, with weekly episodes on Tuesdays on WeTV, and was also available on Viki.

== Synopsis ==
Hero (August Vachiravit) is the son of a general. Unhappy with his father's remarriage and the arrival of a stepmother, he runs away from home and goes to study at a school in the countryside. There, he meets Pop (Mac Nattapat), a poor classmate who lives with his father and grandmother. Hero hides his true identity and approaches Pop with ulterior motives, unaware that Pop is actually his stepmother's stepson.

Their relationship begins with conflict and distrust, but gradually transforms into something deeper. They must face social class differences, family opposition, and the consequences of the lies told at the beginning. In the process, they discover that love can be as addictive as heroin — and that it knows no barriers.

== Cast ==
=== Main ===
- Vachiravit Paisarnkulwong (August) as Rahat Kunkanchana-o-cha (Hero)
- Nattapat Nimjirawat (Mac) as Leosil Panchak / Pop (Poppy)

=== Supporting ===
- Vasin Traiprakhong (Jur) as Yawamon (Tiger)
- Nawaphat Thannamongkhonsawat (Newyear) as Yongchayut (Only)
- Saranwut Chatjaratsaeng (Ball) as Warit (Seal) (Hero's cousin)
- Chutima Maholakul (Ning) as Phailin Suepsakul
- Nanthakorn Sringenthap (BeBoy) as Saensak (Saen) (Hero's adopted brother)
- Pichayapa Natha (Namsai) as Yanujjai (Jannis)
- Nophasit Thiengtham (Pep) as Hanchai (Pop's father)
- Meenay Jutai as Jarinya (Khing) (Pop's mother)
- Savika Kanjanamas (Tuang) as Amphorn (Jeab)
- Aranya Pathumthong (Pui)
- Vimpolphan Chaleejunghran (Jubjang) as Amaraphon (teacher)
- Natthapat Meesuk (Tae)
- Raweephan Siriwattana (Boom) as Saranya (teacher)
- Natphichamon Singkornwat (Yongyee) as Only's mother
- Supprawee Ponlathan (Aey) as Chatsuda (Sai)
- Apichayar Sinithichayanon (Prig)
- Worapong Walor (Save) as Spark

=== Guest ===
- Tinnakorn Puwasakdiwong (Tontae) as PE teacher (Ep. 4)
- Nalliya Wipakkit (Nall) as Lala (Hero's ex-girlfriend)
- Jirawat Vongdilokvath (Mai)

== Production ==
The series was officially announced in 2023, with the main cast confirmed during a press conference on 29 November of that year. The world premiere took place on 13 August 2024 at Major Cineplex Sukhumvit in Bangkok.

The series was produced in partnership between Golden Dog Thailand, Hollywood (Thailand) and HJ Thailand (Hollywood Jinloe).

The official trailer was released in August 2024, garnering millions of views on online platforms.

== Release and reception ==
The series premiered on 13 August 2024 on WeTV, with weekly episodes on Tuesdays at 8:00 p.m. (Thailand time). It was also made available internationally on Viki.

The series trended in several Asian countries during its run, including Japan and China. The official hashtag exceeded 200 million mentions across Instagram, X and Weibo.

Thai media highlighted how the series incorporated elements of Thai soft power, such as cuisine (including grilled pork, fried chicken and omelets) and traditional festivals like Songkran and Loy Krathong, which were featured throughout the episodes.
