= Nattapat Nimjirawat =

Thai actor (born 2007)

- ณัฐพัชร์ นิมจิรวัฒน์
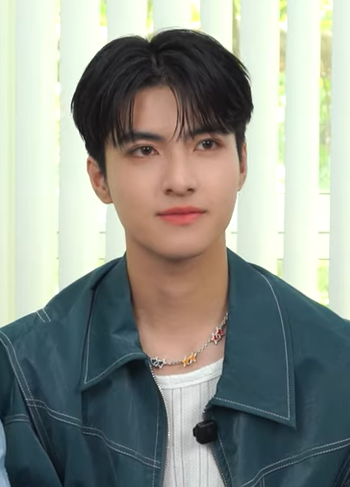
- Nattapat in 2026
- Born: 18 October 2007 (age 19); Bangkok, Thailand
- Other name: Mac (แม็ค)
- Education: Bangkok Christian College
- Occupation: Actor
- Years active: 2013–present
- Agent: GMMTV
- Known for: Wanchalerm in Thong Nuea Kao; Poppy in Addicted Heroin; Rin in Unlucky Bae
- Height: 1.8 m (5 ft 11 in)

Nattapat Nimjirawat (Thai: ณัฐพัชร์ นิมจิรวัฒน์; born 18 October 2007), nicknamed Mac (Thai: แม็ค), is a Thai actor under GMMTV. He began his career as a child actor, gaining recognition for his roles in Thong Nuea Kao (2013) and the film Tukkae Rak Pang Mak (2014). In 2024, he starred in Addicted Heroin alongside Vachiravit Paisarnkulwong. In 2026, he starred in GMMTV's Unlucky Bae.

== Early life ==
Nattapat was born on 18 October 2007 in Bangkok, Thailand. He attends Bangkok Christian College and is the younger brother of former child actress Napattanan Nimjirawat (Mild).

== Career ==
Nattapat began his career as a child actor in 2013, appearing in the series Thong Nuea Kao as Wanchalerm.

In 2014, he appeared in the film Tukkae Rak Pang Mak, playing the young version of the character Tukkae.

In 2019, he appeared in the series He's Coming to Me as a young Thun.

In 2024, he starred in his first leading role in Addicted Heroin, playing Pop (Poppy) alongside Vachiravit Paisarnkulwong (August).

In 2025, he appeared in How to Suffer 101 and My Romance Scammer.

In 2026, Mac starred in Unlucky Bae.

== Filmography ==
=== Film ===
Year	Title	Role	Notes
2014	Chiang Khan Story	Tukkae (young)	Supporting role
2015	The Little Prince	The Prince	Voice, Thai dub
2017	Beauty and the Beast	Chip	Voice, Thai dub
2019	Touchdown Kiss	Ben	Supporting role
2021	The Whole Truth	Putt	Main role

=== Television series ===
Key
†	Denotes television productions that have not yet been released

Year	Title	Role	Network	Notes
2013	Mr. Baan Na	Jimmy (young)	Channel 3	Guest role
2013	Thong Nuea Kao	Wanchalerm (Age 6)	Channel 3	Supporting role
2014	Khun Chai Rakre	"Non" Chayanon	Channel 3	Supporting role
2014	Dao Kiang Duen	Khaotok	Channel 3	Supporting role
2014	Nang Klang Fai	Thawat (young)	True4U	Supporting role
2014	Buang Man	Athip (young)	True4U	Guest role
2015	Ab Ruk Online	—N/a	Channel 3	Guest role
2015	Ngao Jai	Dylan	One31	Guest role
2015	Kol Kimono	Hitoshi	Channel 3	Supporting role
2015	Pan Rak Organic	—N/a	True4U	Guest role
2015	Teppabud Sudwayha	Krapong	Channel 3	Supporting role
2015	Kor Pen Jaosao Suk Krung Hai Cheun Jai	Lom / Lapit (young)	Channel 3	Guest role
2015	Devil Lover	Sora (young)	GMM 25	Supporting role
2015	Poo Ying Khon Nun Chue Boonrawd	Nong Dee Laen	One31	Guest role
2016	Sorry, I Love You	Mon	One31	Supporting role
2016	Than Chai Kammalo	Yingying (young)	Channel 3	Guest role
2016	Wai Sab Saraek Kad	Shogun	Channel 3	Supporting role
2016	Man Dok Ngew	Pakin (young)	Channel 3	Guest role
2016	Luead Rak Torranong	Ram (Age 8)	Channel 3	Supporting role
2016	Kularb Tud Petch	Danupope (young)	Channel 3	Guest role
2017	Lakorn Khon	Din	GMM 25	Supporting role
2017	Mia Luang	Nong	Channel 3	Supporting role
2017	Buang Banjathorn	Laemthong	Channel 3	Supporting role
2017	Rak Rai	Hlong	Channel 3	Supporting role
2018	Ded Peek Nangfah	Akkanee	Channel 3	Supporting role
2018	Kom Faek	Gun Kriengkrai (young)	Channel 3	Guest role
2018	Game Sanaeha	Lakkhanai (young)	Channel 3	Guest role
2018	Dang Phromlikhit Rak	Kong (young)	Channel 3	Guest role
2019	He's Coming to Me	"Thun" Thunyakorn (young)	Line TV	Guest role
2019	Hua Jai Sila	Tor (young)	One31	Guest role
2019	Sleepless Society: Nyctophobia	Arm	One31	Main role
2019	Aruna 2019	August	One31	Supporting role
2019	Nee Ruk Nai Krong Fai	Kawin / Mark (young)	Channel 3	Guest role
2019	Dao Lhong Fah	Dom (young)	Channel 3	Guest role
2020	Sorn Ngao Ruk	Taifah (young)	Channel 3	Guest role
2020	My Bubble Tea	Light (young)	AIS Play	Guest role
2020	Watsana Rak	Boy	Channel 3	Supporting role
2020	Roy Leh Marnya	Ramin (young)	Channel 3	Guest role
2020	My Forever Sunshine	Arthit (young)	Channel 3	Guest role
2022	The Broken Us	Tor	Thai PBS	Supporting role
2023	The Betrayal	Phat	Channel 3	Supporting role
2023	Hangout	Dome	MONOMAX	Supporting role
2024	Addicted Heroin	"Poppy" Loesil Panjak	WeTV	Main role
2024	Addicted Heroin (Uncut version)	"Poppy" Loesil Panjak	WeTV	Main role
2024	Good Doctor Thailand	—N/a	TrueID	Guest role
2025	How to Suffer 101	Win	Thai PBS	Main role
2026	My Romance Scammer	Da Zhan Jiramongkolthanun	GMM 25	Supporting role
2026	Unlucky Bae	"Rin" Darin	GMM 25	Main role
TBA	The Gentlemen's Blood †	TBA	TBA	Main role

=== Music video appearances ===
Year	Title	Artist(s)	Label	Ref.
2024	"ดอกไม้ไฟ (Firework)"; Addicted Heroin OST	August Vachiravit	HJ Thailand	
2024	"After Love"; Addicted Heroin OST	Fahsai Paweensuda	HJ Thailand	

== Discography ==
=== Singles ===
==== Soundtrack appearances ====
Year	Title	Soundtrack	Label	Ref.
2024	"หากฉันตาย (If I Die)" with August Vachiravit	Addicted Heroin OST	HJ Thailand	
2024	"Fly, Fly Away" with August Vachiravit, Newyear Nawaphat, Jur Vasin	Addicted Heroin OST	HJ Thailand	
2026	"รักไม่วัดดวง (Beyond Luck)" with Tham Tupthong	Unlucky Bae OST	GMMTV Records	
2026	"เฉยเลย (Just Like That)"	Unlucky Bae OST	GMMTV Records	

== Fan meetings ==
Title	Date	Venue	Notes	Ref.
Addicted Heroin: The Special Episode	December 1, 2024	Major Sukhumvit, Theatre	With Addicted Heroin cast	
Unlucky Bae: Meet & Mu Together	August 6, 2026	SF World Cinema, CentralWorld	With Unlucky Bae cast	
GMMTV Fanival: Happy Family	October 3, 2026	Union Hall, Union Mall	With Tham	
Unlucky Bae Final EP. Lucky To Meet You	October 8, 2026	SF World Cinema, CentralWorld	With Unlucky Bae cast	

== Concerts ==
Title	Date	Venue	Notes	Ref.
Praew Charity Concert 2026	September 5, 2026	Nex Hall, 5th Fl. Siam Paragon	With Tham, Sea, Keen, FLIO	

== Awards ==
Year	Award	Category	Result	Work
2013	Si San Bonterng Award 2013	Public Favorite (with Melic Efe Iygun, Yongsit Wongpanitnon)	Won	Thong Nuea Kao
2014	Siamdara Stars Awards 2014	Scene Stealer (with Melic Efe Iygun, Yongsit Wongpanitnon)	Won	Thong Nuea Kao
2014	MThai Top Talk-About 2014	Most Talked-About Scene-Stealing Role (with Melic Efe Iygun, Yongsit Wongpanitnon)	Won	Thong Nuea Kao
2014	The Nine Fever Awards 2014	Fever Awards (with Melic Efe Iygun, Yongsit Wongpanitnon)	Won	Thong Nuea Kao
2014	Thai Film Critic Awards 2014	Best Supporting Actor	Nominated	Tukkae Rak Pang Mak
2014	Kom Chad Luek Awards 2014	Best Supporting Actor	Nominated	Tukkae Rak Pang Mak
2014	Suphannahong National Film Awards	Best Supporting Actor	Nominated	Tukkae Rak Pang Mak
2014	Golden Swan Awards (Phra Suraswadi)	Best Rising Star Actor	Nominated	Tukkae Rak Pang Mak
2015	Save The World Expo 2015	Environmental Ambassador Award	Won	—N/a
2018	Kazz Kids Awards	Best Child Actor	Won	—N/a
2023	Nataraja Awards 2023	Best Supporting Actor	Nominated	The Betrayal
2025	Japan Expo Thailand 2025	Rookie Award for Popular Series in Japan (with August Vachiravit)	Won	Addicted Heroin
