= The Grim Lover =

Upcoming 2026 Thai television series

- Official pilot poster
- รักลืมตาย
- Genre: Boys' love; Fantasy; Romance; Drama
- Based on: The Grim Lover by alittlebixth
- Directed by: Natthaphong Wongkaweepairod
- Starring: Krittin Kitjaruwannakul; Naret Promphaopun; Sirinart Sugandharat; Nara Thepnupha; Kasama Khamtanit; Tanawat Hudchaleelaha; Orbnithi Leelavetchabutr; Asre Watthanayakul; Bhumintr Saingam; Atthanin Thaninpanuvivat
- Country of origin: Thailand
- Original language: Thai
- No. of episodes: 13

Production
- Executive producers: Saithip Montrikun Na Ayudhaya; Vorarit Vaijairanai
- Production company: Change2561

Original release
- Network: One 31; OneD; Netflix
- Release: 5 September 2026

The Grim Lover (Thai: รักลืมตาย) is a Thai television series blending boys' love (BL), fantasy, romance, and drama, produced by Change2561 and adapted from the web novel The Grim Lover by author alittlebixth. It stars Krittin Kitjaruwannakul (Pooh) and Naret Promphaopun (Pavel).

The series is scheduled to premiere on 5 September 2026, airing every Saturday at 22:30 ICT on One 31. It will be made available for streaming on the OneD app in Thailand and on Netflix globally.

== Synopsis ==
Won (Naret Promphaopun) is an anesthesiologist who lost his great love in a tragic accident and was falsely accused of murder. On the verge of taking his own life, he encounters a Grim Reaper named Sibsi (Krittin Kitjaruwannakul), who bears the exact face of his deceased lover. The Reaper repeatedly stops him from dying, revealing that their fates are intertwined.

As the story unfolds, Won must fight to prove his innocence while uncovering the mysterious rules of death and the hidden truth behind the accident. Between the world of the living and the dead, an unexpected connection emerges — one that may lead him back to love, truth, and the will to live again.

== Cast and characters ==
=== Main ===
- Krittin Kitjaruwannakul (Pooh) as Sibsi / Fourteen (Rafah)
- Naret Promphaopun (Pavel) as Vivorn Assarak (Won)

=== Supporting ===
- Sirinart Sugandharat (Gift) as Maggie
- Nara Thepnupha as Kloy (doctor)
- Kasama Khamtanit (Aon) as Wangplao (Grim Reaper)
- Tanawat Hudchaleelaha (Tiger) as Tawan (doctor)
- Orbnithi Leelavetchabutr (Ping) as Big
- Asre Watthanayakul (Lee)
- Bhumintr Saingam (Pan) as Chada (officer)
- Atthanin Thaninpanuvivat (Benz) as Chiang
- Rain Issada (Rena) as Oscar
- Phumintr Saingam (Pan) as Captain Chada

== Production ==
The series was announced by Change2561 at the Changeverse 2026 event, held on 28 January 2026 at Iconsiam in Bangkok. The official pilot was released on that occasion.

A script reading and costume fitting event took place on 28 May 2026. The series is produced under the supervision of Saithip Montrikun Na Ayudhaya (Chod), CEO of Change2561, and Vorarit Vaijairanai (Es), deputy managing director.

The actors underwent workshops to prepare for their roles. Pooh followed an intense physical training regimen to portray the Grim Reaper, while Pavel studied techniques and posture of an anesthesiologist to bring more realism to his character.
