= Naret Promphaopun =

Thai actor, model, singer, and entrepreneur (born 1997)

- นเรศ พร้อมเผ่าพันธ์
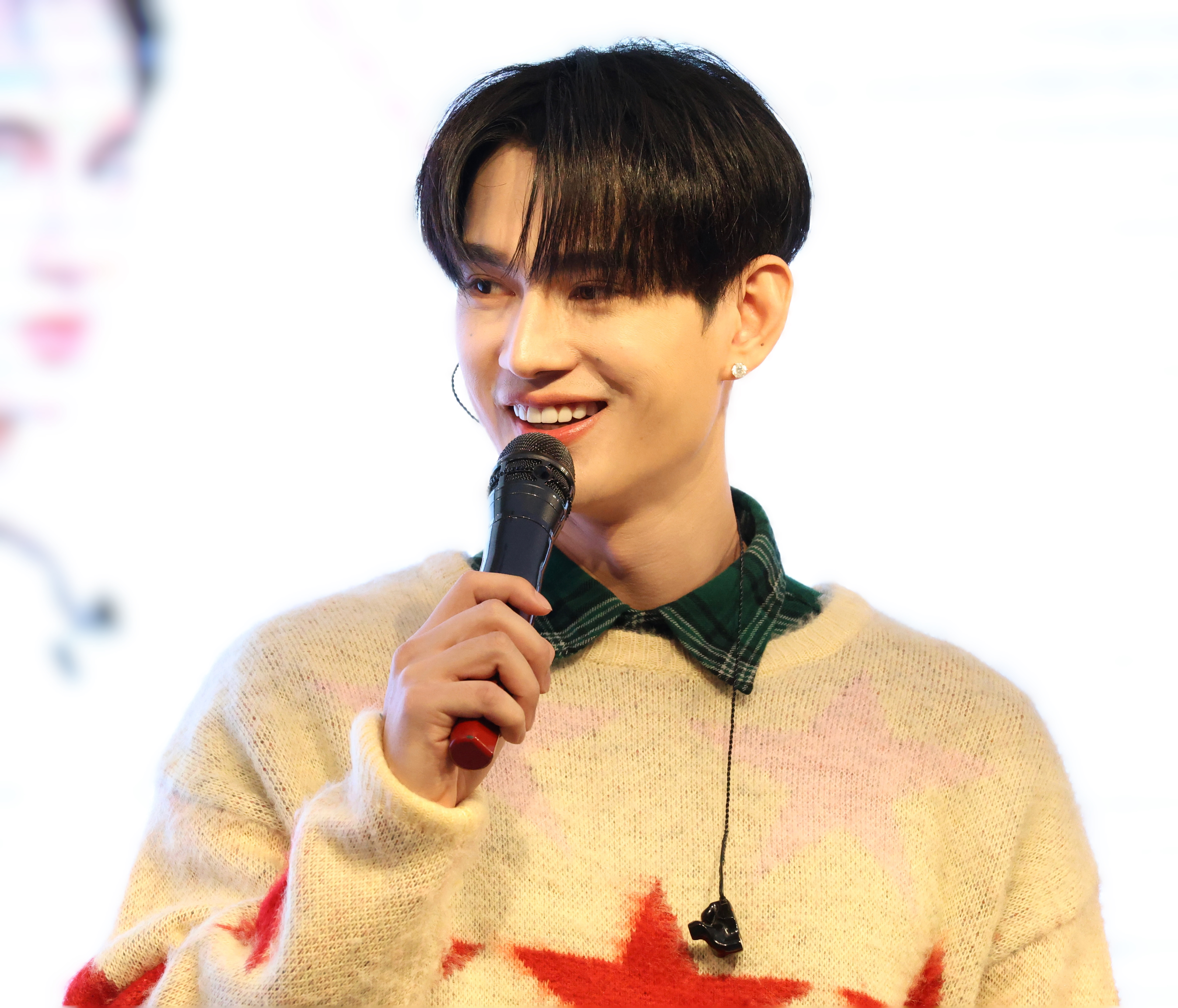
- Naret in December 2024
- Born: 6 May 1997 (age 29); Pathum Thani, Thailand
- Other name: Pavel Phoom
- Education: Rangsit University International College (BA)
- Occupations: Actor; Model; Singer; Entrepreneur
- Years active: 2018–present
- Known for: Forth in 2 Moons 2; Babe in Pit Babe

Naret Promphaopun (Thai: นเรศ พร้อมเผ่าพันธ์), born 6 May 1997), also known as Pavel Phoom (Thai: พาเวลพูม), is a Thai actor, model, singer, and entrepreneur. He is best known for his roles as Forth in 2 Moons 2 and Babe in Pit Babe: The Series.

== Early life and education ==
Naret was born in Thailand, but he traveled to New Zealand with his mother and lived there for eleven years; thus, he can speak English. In his twenties, he returned to Thailand to pursue his dream of working in the entertainment industry. He also attended the Faculty of Communication Arts at Rangsit University in Pathum Thani, a neighboring province just north of Bangkok, also known as RIC. Naret received his Bachelor of Communication Arts degree on January 23, 2022.

== Career ==
Naret was one of the top ten contestants in Elite Model Look 2018, which was held by Elite Model Management. He signed with Elite Model Management and spent a year with them. He made his acting debut in 2019 with the main role of Forth in the BL drama 2 Moons 2.

He made his debut as the group's leader, main dancer, and rapper of Thai boy's project group OXQ on June 4, 2020, under Motive Village. In November of the same year, he confirmed his departure both from Motive Village and the band.

In January 2021, he announced that he would not continue with his role in the third season of 2 Moons.

Naret released his first single, "Drink", in June 2021.

== Business ==
Naret has his own clothing line Half Savage.

== Filmography ==
=== Television series ===
Year	Title	Role	Note
2019	2 Moons 2	Forth	Main role
2022	Coffee Melody	Pleng Ruk	Main role
2023	Pit Babe: The Series	Babe	Main role
2024	Fierce & Furious Academy	Copter	Support role
2025	Pit Babe 2: The Series	Babe	Main role
2025	Goddess Bless You From Death	Singha	Main role
2026	The Grim Lover	Won	Main role

=== Television show ===
Year	Title	Role	Genre	Notes / References
2020	Travel With Us	Host	Travel show	

== Discography ==
Singles
Year	Song	Note	Reference
2021	"Drink" (Thai: ดริงก์)	feat. Young ill	
2024	"Take Your Time"	Solo single; released December 7, 2024	

== Music videos ==
Year	Title	Artist / Group	Notes	Release date	Source
2021	Drink (feat. Young ill)	Pavel Phoom	Solo debut music video	June 11, 2021	
2025	Take Your Time	Pavel Phoom	Official music video	March 21, 2025	

== Awards and nominations ==
Award ceremony, year, category, nominee/work and result
Award	Year	Category	Nominee/work	Result	Ref.
Bangkok Pride Awards	2026	Pride Popular of Y Series Star	with Krittin Kitjaruwannakul	Nominated	
Dailynews Awards	2024	D-Series Actor	Naret Promphaopun	Nominated	
Feed x Khaosod Awards	2025	Best Chemistry	with Krittin Kitjaruwannakul	Won	
Feed x Khaosod Awards	2026	Best Chemistry (Popular Vote)	with Krittin Kitjaruwannakul	Won	
Feed Y Awards	2024	Most Popular Couple	with Krittin Kitjaruwannakul	Won	
Feed Y Awards	2024	Most Popular Series Actor	Naret Promphaopun	Won	
Howe Awards	2026	Hottest Actor Award	Naret Promphaopun	Won	
Global Empower Awards	2026	Best Viral BL Couple Award	with Krittin Kitjaruwannakul	Won	
Kazz Awards	2026	Couple of the Year	with Krittin Kitjaruwannakul	Nominated	
Kazz Awards	2026	Outstanding Actor of the Year	Naret Promphaopun	Won	
Kinnaree Public Awards	2026	Popular Leading Actor Award	with Krittin Kitjaruwannakul	Won	
Kom Chad Luek Awards	2024	Best Superstar	Naret Promphaopun	Nominated	
Kom Chad Luek Awards	2026	Popular Actor	Naret Promphaopun	Won	
Maya TV Awards	2024	Best Supporting Actor	Naret Promphaopun	Nominated	
Maya TV Awards	2024	Best Couple of the Year	with Krittin Kitjaruwannakul	Won	
Maya TV Awards	2026	Male Couple of the Year	with Krittin Kitjaruwannakul	Nominated	
Thailand Y Content Awards	2025	Best Leading Actor	Naret Promphaopun	Nominated	
Thailand Y Content Awards	2025	Popular Vote	Naret Promphaopun	Nominated	
The Viral Hits Awards	2025	Best BL Couple of the Year	with Krittin Kitjaruwannakul	Nominated	
Y Entertain Awards	2025	Y Couple of the Year	with Krittin Kitjaruwannakul	Nominated	
Y Entertain Awards	2026	Y Couple of the Year	with Krittin Kitjaruwannakul	Won	
Y Entertain Awards	2026	Prince of Boys' Love	Naret Promphaopun	Nominated	
Y Universe Awards	2024	The Best Leading Role	Naret Promphaopun	Won	
