= Vachiravit Paisarnkulwong =

Thai actor and model (born 1996)

- วชิรวิชญ์ ไพศาลกุลวงศ์
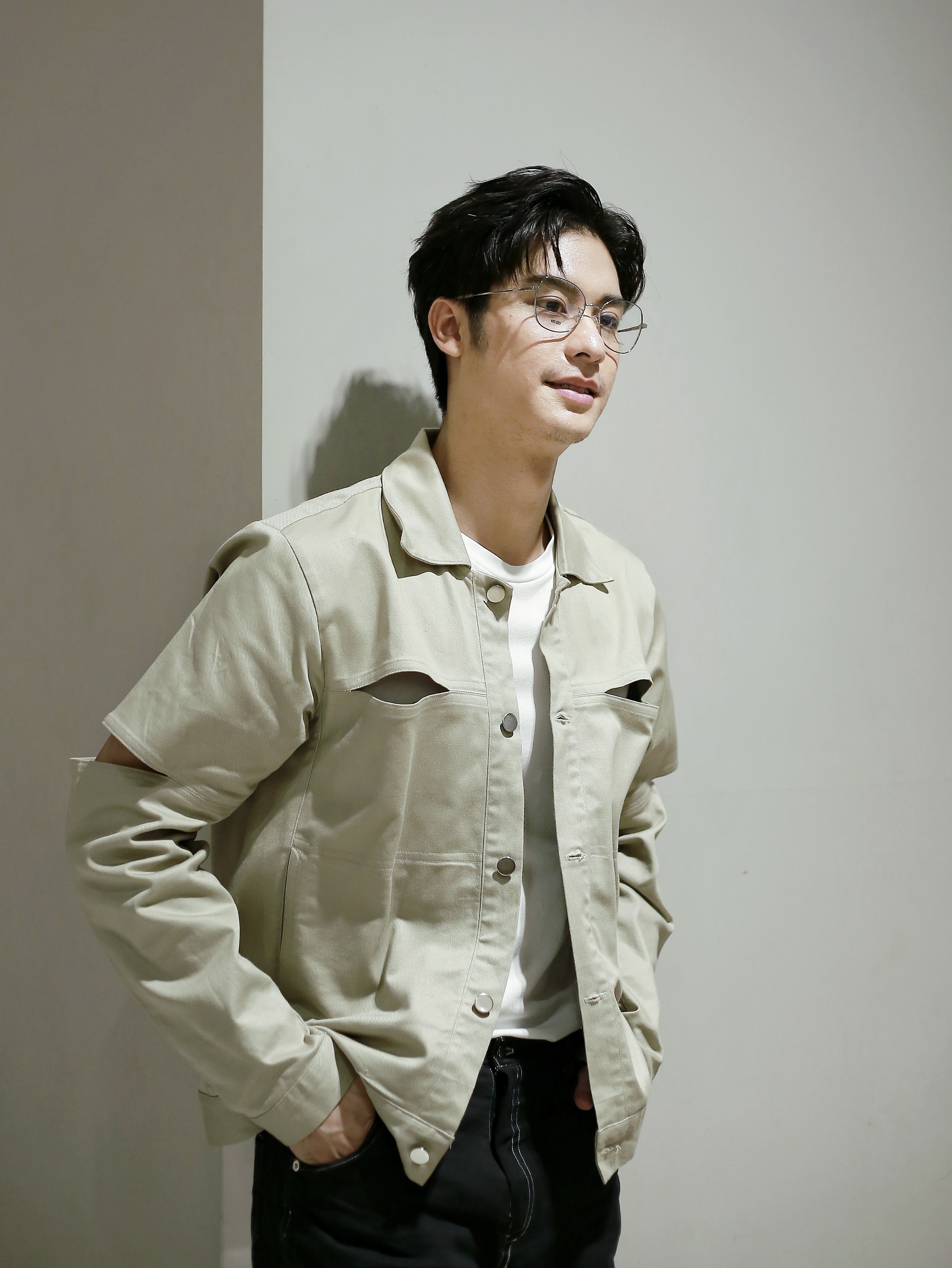
- Vachiravit in 2022
- Born: Vachiravit Paisarnkulwong; August 31, 1996 (age 30); Bangkok, Thailand
- Other name: August
- Education: Thammasat University Allied Health Sciences
- Occupations: Actor; singer
- Years active: 2014–present
- Agents: Channel 3 (2016–2023); Century UU (2026-Present)
- Height: 5 ft 11 in (1.80 m)

Vachiravit Paisarnkulwong (Thai: วชิรวิชญ์ ไพศาลกุลวงศ์, RTGS: Wachirawit Phaisankunlawong; born 31 August 1996), nicknamed August (Thai: ออกัส), is a Thai actor. He is best known for his first leading role as Pete in the Thai Boy Love series Love Sick (2014), which propelled him to fame in Thailand.

== Early life and education ==
Vachiravit was born on August 31, 1996, in Bangkok, Thailand. He graduated from Department of Sports Science and Sports Development, Faculty of Allied Health Sciences at the Thammasat University.

== Career ==
In 2014, he made his acting debut in the television boy love series Love Sick, playing the role of Pete. August was one amongst thousands of contestants who auditioned for the series.

In 2021, August co-starred with Namfah Thunyaphat Phatharathirachaicharoen in Thailand romantic comedy series My Mischievous Fiancée（แม่ครัวคนใหม่/Mae Krua/New Cook/萌新小廚娘/新搞怪女廚), receiving the high ratings in Thailand, Indonesia, Cambodia, and China. It is about a psychologist (August) and his disguised fiancée (Namfah) that were against their arranged marriage to falling in love with each other. Through the series, August and Namfah were acclaimed as new popular stars in Thailand.

He currently into freelance actors after the ended contract with channel 3 in 2023.

== Filmography ==
=== Films ===
Year	Title	Role	Notes	Ref
2019	Pee Nak	Nong	Main role	
2020	Pee Nak 2	Nong	Main role	
TBA	Thesis	TBA	Main role	

=== Television ===
Year	Title	Role	Notes	Network
2014	Love Sick (Season 1)	Pete	Main role	Channel 9
2015	Ghost Wave: The Series	Ja	Main role	Channel 9
2015	Love Sick (Season 2)	Pete	Main role	Channel 9
2015	Part of Love	Icon	Main role	Channel 9
2016	Nong Mai Rai Borisut	Atom	Supporting role	Channel 3
2017	U-Prince: The Extroverted Humanist	Firstclass	Supporting role	GMM 25
2017	U-Prince: The Single Lawyer	Firstclass	Main role	GMM 25
2017	Tawan Yor Saeng	Nopadol / Iang	Supporting role	Channel 3
2018	Behind The Sin: The Series	Chin	Main role	Channel 3
2018	Notification: The Series	Naphat Panyanakoon	Main role	Channel 3
2019	Krong Kam	Mongkhon Asawarungruangkit / See	Main role	Channel 3
2019	Dive	Golf	Supporting role	Youku
2020	My Precious Bad Luck	Guy	Supporting role	Channel 3
2021	My Mischievous Finance	Param Montianrak	Main role	Channel 3
2022	Love Forever After	Psychopomp / Waha Nitipadthanakun	Main role	Channel 3
2023	You Are My Universe	Thian	Main role	Channel 3
2024	My Love in the Countryside	Mana Phanphlai (Ma)	Main role	Channel 3
2024	Addicted Heroin	Rahat Kunkanchana-o-cha (Hero)	Main role	WeTV
2026	The Miracle of 9,999 Zebras	Khun Wephop	Main role	?
2026	Eternal Rain	Nonthasut	Main role	Mono29
2026	Love Destiny	Sunthorn Thewa (Dech)	Main role	Channel 3 HD
2026	Delusion	Wat	Supporting role	Netflix
2026	Built in Love	Pat	Supporting role	GMM 25

=== Concert ===
- Channel 3 Super Fan Live!: SUPERNOVA Universe Explosion Concert

== Discography ==
=== Soundtrack appearances ===
Year	Title	Notes
2014	"อยากเก็บเธอไว้ทั้งสองคน (I Need the Both of You)"	Love Sick OST
2015	"อยากบอกรัก (Memory)" (with Saranthon Klaiudom)	Ghost Wave The Series OST
2015	"ฝัน, ฉัน, เธอ (Dream, Me, You)" (with Tanont Chumroen)	Part of Love OST
2024	"ดอกไม้ไฟ (Firework)"	Addicted Heroin OST
2024	"หากฉันตาย (If I Die)" (with Mac Nattapat)	Addicted Heroin OST
2024	"Fly, Fly Away" (with Mac Nattapat, Newyear Nawaphat, Jur Vasin)	Addicted Heroin OST
2026	"โอ้...หัวใจ (Oh...My Heart)"	Love Destiny OST
2026	"ทำทรง (Acting Cool)" (with Na Naphat, Thun Thunyatorn, Vin Tanapon)	Love Destiny OST
2026	"有你的烟火 (Destiny Sparks)" (with Leng Thanaphon)	Love Destiny OST

== Awards and nominations ==
Year	Award	Category	Nominated work	Result	Ref.
2015	TUTV Awards	POP Young Man of the Year	—N/a	Won	
2015	Daradaily Digital Gen Awards	Best Digital Star of the Year	—N/a	Won	
2015	10th OK! Awards	The Hottest Cast	Love Sick	Won	
2015	ZEN Stylish Awards	Popular Vote	Love Sick	Won	
2016	Mekkala Awards	Rising Star Award	Love Sick	Won	
2016	10th Kazz Awards	Popular New Male Star	—N/a	Won	
2017	National Abstention Day	Outstanding Individual in the Prevention and Control of Alcohol Consumption	—N/a	Won	
2017	3rd Maya Awards	Male Rising Star	Tawan Yor Saeng	Nominated	
2018	Thailand Master Youth	Youth Role Model Award	—N/a	Won	
2018	7th Daradaily The Great Awards	Male Rising Star of the Year	Tawan Yor Saeng	Nominated	
