= Class Crush Crisis =

2026 Thai television series

- Official series poster
- Thai: เพื่อนสนิทระวังคิดไม่ซื่อ
- Genre: Boys' love; Coming-of-age; Romantic comedy; Teen drama
- Based on: Class Crush Crisis by JittiRain
- Screenplay by: Kanokphan Ornrattanasakul; Issaraporn Kuntisuk; Sorawit Muangkaew; Natthakit Fungcharoen
- Directed by: Nutthapong Wongkaveepairoj
- Starring: Aeiyapol Lekpittaya; Yannawat Intarapaen
- Opening theme: "No More Hiding (คือฉันอะ)" by Yujeen, Yugene
- Ending theme: "Never Right (จะมาอะไร)" by Yujeen, Yugene
- Country of origin: Thailand
- Original language: Thai
- No. of episodes: 8

Production
- Executive producer: Saithip Montrikul Na Ayudhaya; Vorarit Vaijairanai
- Running time: 53–68 minutes
- Production company: Change2561

Original release
- Network: One 31; OneD; Netflix
- Release: 24 July – 11 September 2026

Class Crush Crisis (Thai: เพื่อนสนิทระวังคิดไม่ซื่อ; RTGS: Phuean Sanit Rawang Khit Mai Sue, lit. 'Close Friends Beware of Dishonesty') is a 2026 Thai boys' love romantic drama television series directed by Nutthapong Wongkaveepairoj and produced by Change2561. The series stars Aeiyapol Lekpittaya (Yujeen) and Yannawat Intarapaen (Yugene).

The series premiered on 24 July 2026, airing weekly on Fridays on One 31, OneD in Thailand, and Netflix internationally.

== Synopsis ==
LeeIth (Aeiyapol Lekpittaya) is a tenth grade high school student (Matthayom 4) who dreams of becoming an indie rock musician. His mother gets him to transfer to Watthana Kunlaya School, a prestigious formerly all-girls school that has just started to admit male students for the first time. Determined not to let romance interfere with his friendships, he makes a promise to avoid falling in love.

His resolve begins to falter when he is assigned to share a dormitory room with Putter (Yannawat Intarapaen), a disciplined and academically gifted student. As the two grow closer, LeeIth finds himself questioning the promise he made, while both navigate life at a school undergoing major change and the unexpected feelings that develop between classmates and friends.

== Cast and characters ==
=== Main ===
- Aeiyapol Lekpittaya (Yujeen) as Itthadol Poonyawech (LeeIth)
- Yannawat Intarapaen (Yugene) as Pat Charoenpornkusol (Putter)

=== Supporting ===
- Aschawin Jiratisakul (Hero) as Ekkachat Haripoonrat (Indy)
- Buffett Wongprasert (Idea) as Jia
- Chavid Pevec (Vino) as Tungtae
- Sasakrit Rithruangnam (BBoss) as Yuki
- Supanut Satpan (Bossu) as Nakhun
- Nudtha Papirom (Aomthong) as Faye
- Nararin Udomsithikul (Nara) as Proud
- Busaya Wanna (Bew) as Summer
- Kantinan Jangwang (Min) as Min
- Natcha Cochapatsap (Ploy) as Yihwa
- Teerapong Suparwong (Yai) as Leo
- Teerawate Suparwong (Lek) as Neo
- Nawinta Lekpittaya (Yurin) as Lilly
- Patthanit Pipatchaipaisan (Sincere) as Fang
- Kasama Kamtanit (Aon) as Tiw
- Penpetch Benyakul (Jab) as LeeIth's father
- Chanokwanun Rakcheep (Took) as LeeIth's mother
- Premsinee Ratanasopa (Cream) as Aom
- Suttikan Wangjaroentaweekul (Amp) as Putter's mother

== Soundtrack ==
Class Crush Crisis Soundtrack
No.	Title	Writer(s)	Artist	Length
1.	"Puppy Love"	Okomo P; Momo P	Milk Powder Gang (แก๊งนมผง)	3:03
2.	"No More Hiding (คือฉันอะ)"	Peerapon Iamjamrat (Three Man Down)	Yujeen Aeiyapol; Yugene Yannawat	3:56
3.	"Sweet Panic (ยิ่งใกล้ยิ่งคิด)"	Krittikorn Pornsatit	Aomthong Nudtha; Nara Nararin; Bew Busaya	3:02
4.	"Never Right (จะมาอะไร)"	Okomo P; Momo P	Yujeen Aeiyapol; Yugene Yannawat	3:13

== Production ==
Class Crush Crisis was officially announced during the Changeverse 2026 event in January 2026 as part of Change2561's new slate of productions aimed at both Thai and international audiences.

On 23 February 2026, the production held its official fitting session, introducing the principal cast and revealing the first details of the series. According to Change2561, the story follows students at a prestigious girls' school undergoing its transition to coeducation, exploring themes of friendship, romance, family expectations and the changing relationships experienced by young people within the school environment.

A blessing ceremony for good luck was held on at GMM Grammy Place on 13 May 2026.

== Marketing ==
The cast promoted the series with busking events held at Iconsiam, CentralWorld, and Siam Square on 27 June 2026.

Class Crush Crisis First Premiere event was held at the Siam Pavalai Royal Grand Theatre, Siam Paragon on 24 July 2026.
