= Pit Babe (TV series) =

2023 Thai television series

- Thai: พิษเบ๊บ
- Genre: Sports drama; Romantic drama; Boys' Love; Omegaverse
- Based on: Pit Babe (พิษเบ๊บ) by _alittlebitch
- Written by: Kanokphan Ornrattanasakul; Issaraporn Kuntisuk; Irene Insot
- Directed by: Nopachai Jayanama
- Starring: Naret Promphaopun; Krittin Kitjaruwannakul
- Country of origin: Thailand
- Original language: Thai
- No. of seasons: 2
- No. of episodes: 26

Production
- Executive producers: Saithip Montrikun Na Ayudhaya; Vorarit Vaijairanai
- Running time: 47–62 minutes
- Production company: Change2561

Original release
- Network: One31; iQIYI
- Release: 10 November 2023 – 25 July 2025

Pit Babe: The Series (Thai: พิษเบ๊บ) is a 2023 Thai television drama starring Naret Promphaopun (Pavel) and Krittin Kitjaruwannakul (Pooh). It is based on the novel of the same name by _alittlebitch (also known as alittlebixth).

Directed by Nopachai Jayanama (Peter) and produced by Change2561, the series premiered on One31 on 10 November 2023 and concluded on 9 February 2024, after 13 episodes. On 25 April 2024, the series was officially renewed for a second season. The second season premiered on 2 May 2025.

== Synopsis ==
Charlie (Krittin Kitjaruwannakul), a recent graduate, dreams of becoming a race car driver, but lacks his own racing car. His only solution is to seek help from Babe (Naret Promphaopun), a well-known racer. Babe agrees to help him pursue his dream—on the condition that Charlie becomes someone who obeys him. A heated agreement begins...

== Cast and characters ==
=== Main ===
- Naret Promphaopun (Pavel) as Babe
- Krittin Kitjaruwannakul (Pooh) as Charlie

=== Supporting ===
- Supanut Lourhaphanich (Nut) as Ponrawat Wachirabantoon (Way)
- Hemmawich Kwanamphaiphan (Sailub) as Alan
- Thanapon Aiemkumchai (Pon) as Jeff
- Orbnithi Leelavetchabutr (Ping) as Pete
- Pantach Kankham (Garfield) as Kenta
- Kiettisak Vatanavitsakul (Michael) as North
- Supakorn Saokhor (Topten) as Sonic
- Asre Watthanayakul (Lee) as Dean
- Pataraphol Wanlopsiri (Pop) as Winner
- Atthanin Thaninpanuvivat (Benz) as Kim
- Vorarit Vaijairanai (S) as Tony Chen
- Natchanon Supravorawong (Milk) Willy
- Supanut Lourhaphanich (Nut also) Chris (Way's twin)

=== Guest ===
- Byron Bishop as Reval (Babe's father) (Ep. 12)
- Supakorn Kantanit (Guitar) as Andy (Tony's assistant)
- Natchaphat Kerdmuangsamut (Than) as young Babe (Ep. 7)

== Season 2 ==
On 25 April 2024, Change2561 announced at a press conference that the series would return for a second season titled Pit Babe 2. On 12 December, the company held a launch event for the new season. Filming officially began on 23 January 2025. The second season premiered on 2 May 2025.

== Awards and nominations ==
Award nominations for Pit Babe
Year	Award	Category	Nominee(s)	Result	Ref.
2024	Kazz Awards	Kazz Magazine Popular Award	—N/a	Won	
2024	12th Ganesha Awards	Best Y Series	—N/a	Won	
2024	Feed Y Awards	Most Popular Series	—N/a	Nominated	—
2024	Feed Y Awards	Series of the Year	—N/a	Won	
2024	Y Entertain Awards	Best Production Team of the Year	—N/a	Won	
2024	Y Entertain Awards	Best Boys' Love Series of the Year	—N/a	Nominated	—
2024	Y Universe Awards	Best Series	—N/a	Nominated	—
2024	Y Universe Awards	Best Y Series	—N/a	Nominated	—
2024	Y Universe Awards	Best BL Series	—N/a	Nominated	—
2024	Y Universe Awards	Most Anticipated Upcoming Series	Pit Babe 2	Nominated	—
2024	Y Universe Awards	Best Original Soundtrack	Better Me	Nominated	—
