= Change2561 =

Thai television show production and drama company

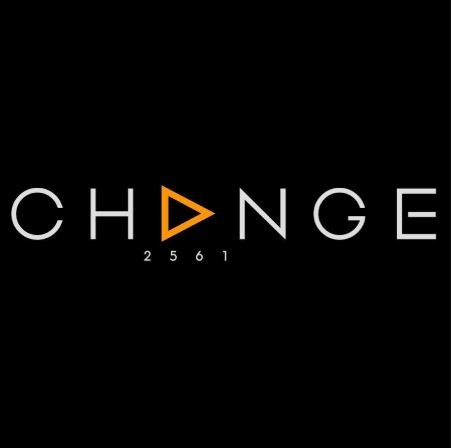
- Type: Limited company
- Industry: Film and television production, artist management, music events, content creation, media
- Founded: 2018; 8 years ago
- Headquarters: 50 GMM Grammy Place, Sukhumvit 21 Khlong Tan Nuea subdistrict Watthana District Bangkok
- Key people: Saithip Montrikul Na Ayutthaya; Worarit Waijaeranai
- Owner: GMM Grammy

Change2561 (Thai: เช้นจ์2561) it is a Thai television and drama company. Founded by Saithip Montrikul Na Ayutthaya on April 20, 2018 under GMM25, which was originally held 50% by GMM Grammy and the Sirivadhanabhakdi family. When The One Enterprise later acquired GMM, both shareholders sold their stakes.

== History ==
Change2561 Co., Ltd. was established in 2018 by Saithip Montrikul Na Ayutthaya after resigning from her position as Vice Chairman of GMM Holding Co., Ltd. Initially, Change2561 Co., Ltd. was 50% owned by GMM Grammy through GMM Holding, and the remaining 50% was held by Adelfos, owned by Thapana Sirivadhanabhakdi and Panote Sirivadhanabhakdi. Later, The One Enterprise, led by Takonkiet Viravan, acquired GMM Channel Holdings, forcing both companies to sell all their shares to The One Enterprise.

== Filmography ==
=== Television dramas ===
- The Leaves (2019)
- Cotton in Silk (2020)
- Krachao Seeda (2021)
- Bad Beauty (2022)
- Husband in Disguise (2022)
- The Root (2022)
- Behind the Revenge (2023)
- Pit Babe (2023–2025)
- This Love Doesn't Have Long Beans (2024)
- Affair (2024)
- The Lady and Her Lovers (2024)
- Harmony Secret (2025)
- I'm the Most Beautiful Count (2025)
- Goddess Bless You From Death (2025)
- I Wanna Be Sup'tar (2026)
- Hometown Romance (2026)
- Chasing Love (2026)
- Class Crush Crisis (2026)
- The Crow Club (2026)
- The Grim Lover (TBA)
