= Future (Thai TV series) =

2023 Thai television series

- Official poster
- Thai: FUTURE วิศวะสุดหล่อขอหมอเป็นเมีย
- Genre: Boys' love; Romantic comedy
- Based on: Future by Faddist
- Screenplay by: Faddist; Karnpicha Pongpanit
- Directed by: Karnpicha Pongpanit; Natthathirit Boonsan
- Starring: Boom Natthapat Chanchaisombat; Bigboom Jirayu Sahguansin
- Opening theme: "ปีนไม่ไหว" by Bever Patsapon Jansuppakitkun
- Country of origin: Thailand
- Original language: Thai
- No. of episodes: 6

Production
- Running time: 45 minutes
- Production company: Rookie Thailand

Original release
- Network: MCOT HD
- Release: 19 March – 30 April 2023

Future (FUTURE วิศวะสุดหล่อขอหมอเป็นเมีย) is a 2023 Thai boys' love romantic comedy television series produced by Rookie Thailand. Based on the novel of the same name by Faddist, a spin-off of Love Mechanics, the series aired on MCOT HD from 19 March to 30 April 2023. It stars Boom Natthapat Chanchaisombat and Bigboom Jirayu Sahguansin, with Thanakom Minthananan (Win), Khunakorn Sunantham (Tee), Patnicha Kulasingh (Plai), Nathadej Pititranun (Jeff), and Patsapon Jansuppakitkun (Bever) in main cast.

The screenplay was written by Faddist and Karnpicha Pongpanit. The series was directed by Karnpicha Pongpanit alongside Natthathirit Boonsan.

== Synopsis ==
After realizing that nearly all of his friends are in relationships, Fuse, a popular engineering student, decides it is finally time to find someone of his own. With the help of his friend Thotsakan, a medical student, he meets Ana, a fifth-year dentistry student. What begins as a simple crush gradually develops into a romantic relationship, but the couple must overcome personal insecurities, past relationships, and opposition from Fuse's family.

== Cast ==
=== Main ===
- Boom Natthapat Chanchaisombat (Boom) as Fuse
- Bigboom Jirayu Sahguansin (Bigboom) as Ana
- Khunakorn Sunantham (Tee) as Guy
- Thanakom Minthananan (Win) as Khamphan
- Patnicha Kulasingh (Plai) as Paula
- Nathadej Pititranun (Jeff) as Thotsakan ("Kan")
- Patsapon Jansuppakitkun(Bever) as James

=== Supporting ===
- Got Kanidsorn Laiwrakoran as Bar
- Prat Itthichaicharoen as Kla
- Frong Thammasiri Umpujh as Wind
- Title Tanatorn Saengngernnikorn as Top
- Toosafe Krittawat Suwanich

== Soundtrack ==
Year	Title	Performer	Notes
2023	ปีนไม่ไหว ("Climb No More")	Bever Patsapon Jansuppakitkun	Official soundtrack.

== Production ==
Future was announced by Rookie Thailand as an original boys' love television series adapted from Faddist's novel of the same name. Faddist co-wrote the screenplay with Karnpicha Pongpanit, who also directed the series alongside Natthathirit Boonsan. The series premiered on MCOT HD on 19 March 2023 and aired every Sunday for six episodes. Following each television broadcast, episodes were released on Rookie Thailand's official YouTube channel.

An official teaser was released on Rookie Thailand's YouTube channel on 26 February 2023.
