= Khunakorn Sunantham =

Thai actor

- คุณากร สุนันธรรม
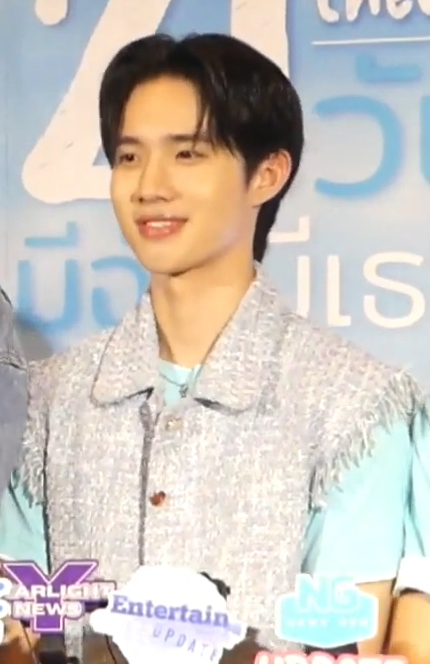
- Teerex in 2022
- Born: October 8, 2000 (age 25); Thailand
- Other names: Tee; Teerex
- Occupations: Actor, television personality
- Years active: 2021–present
- Known for: Tae (Latte) in The Cupid Coach (2021); Q in 21 Days Theory (2022)

Khunakorn Sunantham (Thai: คุณากร สุนันธรรม; born 8 October 2000), also known by the nicknames Tee (Thai: ตี๋) and Teerex (Thai: ทีเร็กซ์), is a Thai actor. He is known for his roles in The Cupid Coach (2021), produced for LINE TV, 21 Days Theory (2022), produced by Rookie Thailand, and Future (2023), which aired on Channel 9 MCOT HD.

== Career ==
Khunakorn made his acting debut in 2021 in The Cupid Coach, portraying Tae (Latte), one of the series' lead characters, alongside Nutchanon Juengdamrongkit (Peace) and Varayu Phusomjitsakul (Pak). In 2022, he portrayed Q opposite Patsapon Jansuppakitkun in 21 Days Theory. Their on-screen pairing became known as BeverTeerex. During the same year, he became a regular cast member of the variety programme Love or Lie.

In 2023, Khunakorn portrayed Guy in Future, a Rookie Thailand production that aired on Channel 9 MCOT HD and was also released through the company's YouTube channel.

== Filmography ==
=== Television ===
Year	Title	Role	Network / Platform	Notes
2021	The Cupid Coach	Tae (Latte)	LINE TV	Lead role
2022	21 Days Theory	Q	YouTube (Rookie Thailand)	Lead role
2023	Future	Guy	MCOT, YouTube	Main cast
2024	The Rule	Titti	YouTube (The Rule กฎลับซ่อนหลอน)	Supporting role

=== Television programmes ===
Year	Title	Role
2022	Love or Lie	Regular cast member

=== Music videos ===
Year	Song	Artist	Album	Ref.
2021	When Love Is Right	Seksan Panprathip	The Cupid Coach (Original Soundtrack)	
2022	บังเอิญตั้งใจรัก (Acoustic Version)	Bever Patsapon	21 Days Theory (Original Soundtrack)	
2023	ปีนไม่ไหว	Bever Patsapon	Future (Original Soundtrack)	

== Promotional events ==
Date	Event	Location	Ref.
7 August 2022	Official launch event for 21 Days Theory, featuring a press conference, cast presentation, musical performances and fan activities.	MCC Hall, The Mall Bangkapi, Bangkok	

== Awards and nominations ==
Year	Award	Work	Category	Result	Ref.
2021	Thailand Master Youth Awards	The Cupid Coach	Rising Actor Award	Won	
