= Anan Wong =

Thai actor and model (born 1998)

- อานันท์ ว่อง
- Anan in 2026
- Born: 1 October 1998 (age 28)
- Other names: Yin; Yinyin
- Education: Srinakharinwirot University (Faculty of Engineering)
- Occupations: Actor; model
- Years active: 2019–present
- Agent: Rookie Thailand (2019–2022)
- Known for: Vee in En of Love: Love Mechanics
- Height: 183 cm (6 ft 0 in)

Chinese name
- Traditional Chinese: 黃立賢
- Simplified Chinese: 黄立贤
Transcriptions
Yue: Cantonese
- Jyutping: wong^{4} lap^{6} jin^{4}
- IPA: [wɔŋ˩ lɐp̚˨ jin˩]

Anan Wong (Thai: อานันท์ ว่อง; born 1 October 1998), nicknamed Yin (Thai: หยิ่น), is a Thai actor and model of Hong Kong descent. He is well known for his role in the television series En of Love: Love Mechanics (2020).

== Early life and education ==
Anan was born on 1 October 1998. His Chinese name is Wong Lap Yin (Chinese: 黃立賢; Jyutping: wong4 lap6 jin4). His family consists of his father who is a native of Hong Kong, his Thai mother, an older sibling, and a grandmother who lives with them.

He completed his secondary school at Sarasas Witaed Bangbon School. In 2021, Anan completed his bachelor's degree in Computer Engineering at Srinakharinwirot University (SWU), graduating with first class honors.

== Career ==
Pre-acting career, Anan joined Srinakharinwirot University's Open House Project, providing future students with useful information about the university and their subject areas. During these school events, people took pictures of him and shared them in various social media platforms. After seeing his photos, he was then contacted by the manager of his former agency Rookie Thailand to do product reviews and modeling.

Anan made an appearance in GMMTV's Jen Jud God Jig, where he was interviewed by the show's hosts, Jennie Panhan and Godji Tatchakorn. Anan made his acting debut with a leading role in the Thai BL (boys' love) mini series En of Love. En of Love was a project by Studio Wabi Sabi consisting of three stories. In March 2019, it was announced that he would be playing the role Vee, a 3rd year engineering student and the main protagonist in the 2nd story of En of Love, titled Love Mechanics.

Even with 3.5 short episodes, this particular story and couple in En of Love received the most love from fans in Thailand, as well as internationally, gaining millions of views on Line TV and on YouTube. The last episode of Love Mechanics earned more than 1 million tweets, trending in many different countries, and number one worldwide. The success of the series along with the overflowing chemistry of the two lead actors launched the shipped couple called "YinWar", which is the combined name of Anan (Yin) with co-star Wanarat Ratsameerat (War). Despite their series having just a few episodes, this pair managed to become one of the most talked about in 2020, earning many endorsements, event and show appearances, and nominations in various award categories.

Due to the popularity of YinWar and En Of Love: Love Mechanics, in October 2020, a full series called "Love Mechanics The Series" was announced to air in 2021 under Studio Wabi Sabi, which would consist of 16 episodes in total. In early 2021, Rookie Thailand announced that Love Mechanics will no longer be produced by Studio Wabi Sabi. In September 2021, WeTV revealed that Love Mechanics will be part of their 2022 lineup. This series would be a collaboration between Rookie Thailand and WeTV, and will be directed by Lit Samajarn.

Alongside the announcement of the full series, Anan's new show with his on-screen partner Wanarat called WxY was also announced. It premiered in December 2020 on Rookie Thailand's YouTube channel. Anan made his official singing debut when both him and Wanarat featured in a song called "Ta Taek", by Thai rappers, Milli and Wonderframe. The song was released in December 2020 on different music platforms and an official music video starring all four artists was also released on the same day on YouTube.

On 10 March 2021, Anan released his first official song "On Mai Keng", which is a duet with Wanarat. On 18 March 2021, a week after the song's release date, an official music video featuring the two of them was uploaded on YouTube. Rookie Thailand just released a statement: Yin Anan, War Wanarat, and Prom Ratchapat decided to be freelance actors, and their contract will expire on 31 January 2022. He co-founded a production company YWPB, through which he and Wanarat fully produced and invested ~25 million baht in the Jack & Joker special episode. In 2024, he starred as the lead character Jack in Jack & Joker: U Steal My Heart!, a romantic comedy series broadcast on Channel 3, further expanding his mainstream presence beyond the BL genre.

In 2025, he and longtime co-star Wanarat Ratsameerat produced a special episode of Jack & Joker focusing on their characters' married life. This project was self-funded under their own production company, YWPB, and premiered at their fan meeting event "Life is but a Dream with YinWar" in Bangkok on 22 February 2025. They reportedly invested approximately 25 million baht into the project and were involved in production and scripting. Later in 2025, Yin and War teased another original BL project titled The Blxpress, with promotional content released in May and a premiere expected in late 2025. During the same period, Anan launched a fashion pop-up at Siam Center under his clothing brand "Anwyll Club," reinforcing his presence in both entertainment and business.

== Personal life ==
In July 2020, Anan, along with his labelmates and close friends Wanarat Ratsameerat and Ratchapat Worrasarn, launched their first clothing brand called "Sobyohey".

== Filmography ==
=== Television series ===
Year	Title	Role	Notes	Channel	Ref.
2019	Jen Jud God Jig	Himself	Guest role (Ep.12)	GMMTV	
2020	En of Love: Tossara	Vee		LINE TV / YouTube	
2020	En of Love: Love Mechanics	Vee		LINE TV / YouTube	
2020	EN of Love: This is Love Story	Vee		LINE TV / YouTube	
2020	WxY		Host	YouTube	
2021	The Best Story	Dew		LINE TV / YouTube	
2021	Laneige Weekend with YinWar		Host	YouTube	
2021	Yin Yang		Host	YouTube	
2022	Love Mechanics	Vee		WeTV	
2023	Club Friday Love & Belief: 3 of Us	Atom			
2024	Jack & Joker: U Steal My Heart!	Jack		Channel 3	
2024	Sad Power	Thua		Workpoint Channel; Netflix	
2025	Jack & Joker: Special Episode	Jack		Channel 3 / YWPB	
2025	Neon Flower Waiting for Love	Fahkram		Instagram	
2026	Police in Love	Thiar		WeTV	

=== Film ===
Year	Title	Role	Notes	Director	Ref.
2021	Pha Phi Bok	Jao Luang		Chookiat Sakveerakul	

=== Music video appearances ===
Year	Song title	Artist(s)	Role	Notes	Ref.
2020	"เศษผม" (Set Pom)	Anan Wong (Yin) Wanarat Ratsameerat (War) Jay Phitiwat	Vee	Official Music Video En of Love: Love Mechanics OST	
2020	"รู้" (Roo)	Anan Wong (Yin)	Himself	Music Video Directed by Wanarat Ratsameerat (War)	
2020	"ตาแตก" (Ta Taek)	Anan Wong (Yin) Wanarat Ratsameerat (War) Milli Wonderframe	Groom	Official Music Video FreeFire Collaboration	
2021	"ไม่ใช่ไม่รู้สึก" (Mai Chai Mai Roo Seuk)	Anan Wong (Yin) Wanarat Ratsameerat (War) Tom Isara	Jay	Official Music Video	
2021	"อ้อนไม่เก่ง" (On Mai Keng)	Anan Wong (Yin) Wanarat Ratsameerat (War)	Himself	Official Music Video	
2021	"แล้วหลาว(ไอ้โบ้)" (Fool)	Anan Wong (Yin) Wanarat Ratsameerat (War) Wonderframe	Friend	Official Music Video FreeFire Collaboration	
2021	"รักปัดขวา" (Rak Pat Kwa)	Anan Wong (Yin) Wanarat Ratsameerat (War)	Himself	Official Music Video JOOXSwipeRightxYinWar	
2022	"เหล่ท่อ" (Laeo Tho / Superb)	YinWar ft. Kangsomks	Himself	Solo single produced by Kangsomks	
2022	"Tell People About Us" (เปิดตัวได้แล้ว)	YinWar (Anan Wong & Wanarat)	Himself	YinWar official single	
2023	"รักไม่รู้ตัว" (Rak Mai Ru Tua)	YinWar	Himself	Official MV	
2023	"เพื่อนที่จริงใจ" (Phuean Thee Jing Jai)	YinWar & Wanarat Ratsameerat	Himself	Official MV	

== Discography ==
Year	Song title	Label	Ref
2020	"รู้" (Roo) (together with Phongsakorn Lamprasert)	—	
2020	"ตาแตก" (Ta Taek) (together with Wanarat Ratsameerat, Milli and Wonderframe)	YUPP!	
2021	"อ้อนไม่เก่ง" (On Mai Keng) (together with Wanarat Ratsameerat)	Rookie Music	
2021	"แล้วหลาว(ไอ้โบ้)" (Fool) (together with Wanarat Ratsameerat and Wonderframe)	Wonderframe	
2021	"รักปัดขวา" (Rak Pat Kwa) (together with Wanarat Ratsameerat)	JOOX	
2022	"เหล่ท่อ" (Laeo Tho / Superb)	Anan Wong (self-released)	
2022	"Tell People About Us" (เปิดตัวได้แล้ว)	YWPB Records (Yin War duo)	
2023	"รักไม่รู้ตัว" (Rak Mai Ru Tua / Love Unknowingly)	YWPB Records	
2024	"เพื่อนที่จริงใจ" (Phuean Thee Jing Jai / A Genuine Friend)	YWPB Records	

== Concerts ==
Date	Event	Place
15 August 2020	EN of Love Live Fan Meeting 'Eternally'	KBank Siam Pic-Ganesha Theater
24 December 2022	YinWar Concert: Partner in Crime	Union Hall 2, Thailand
25–26 November 2023	ANKNOWNR The Unexpected Experiment	MCC Hall, Bangkok
11–12 October 2025	Yin War Concert: ดอกนีออนรอรัก	Union Hall, Union Mall, Bangkok

== Awards and nominations ==
Year	Award	Category	Result	Nominated works
2020	Hello Asian Awards 2020	Top Trending on Twitter	Won	—
2021	Yniverse Awards 2020	Sun of the Yniverse	Won	En of Love: Love Mechanics
2021	Yniverse Awards 2020	Gemini of the Yniverse	Won (shared with Wanarat Ratsameerat)	En of Love: Love Mechanics
2021	T-Pop Stage	Rookie of the Week (Week 7)	Won (shared with Wanarat Ratsameerat)	"อ้อนไม่เก่ง" (On Mai Keng)
2021	T-Pop Stage	Rookie of the Week (Week 8)	Won (shared with Wanarat Ratsameerat)	"อ้อนไม่เก่ง" (On Mai Keng)
2021	KAZZ Awards 2021	Attractive Young Male of the Year	Won	—
2021	Sanook สุดจัดแห่งปี	Hottest On-screen Couple of the Year (with Wanarat)	Won	—
2022	Sudsapda Y Awards	The Duo Star of the Year (with Wanarat)	Won	—
2022	Yuniverse Awards	Best Partner: Yin–War	Won	—
2022	WeTV Awards	Best Thai Series	Won	Love Mechanics
2022	WeTV Awards	Best BL Series	Won	Love Mechanics
2022	LINE Stickers Awards	Best Group Sticker	Won	YWPB
2024	BL Army PH Year-End Awards	Best Actor	Won	Jack & Joker
