= Love Area =

2021 Thai television series

- Love Area ครั้งหนึ่ง…เราเคยรักกัน
- Genre: Boys' love, Drama
- Directed by: Nattapat Sookwongsil
- Country of origin: Thailand
- Original language: Thai
- No. of episodes: 6

Production
- Running time: 45 min

Original release
- Network: Channel 9, GagaOOLala
- Release: July 24 – August 28, 2021

Love Area (thai: Love Area ครั้งหนึ่ง...เราเคยรักกัน) is a Thai television series BL broadcast in 2021 on Channel 9 and distributed internationally by GagaOOLala. The series premiered on July 24, 2021 and concluded on August 28, 2021, with six weekly episodes.

== Synopsis ==
Valen, a young man who has never experienced love, not even from his parents, meets Kaitoon, a student working at a restaurant called Love Area. After an unexpected encounter, Valen starts working there and, through rivalry and growing closeness, learns about affection, trust, and romance alongside Kaitoon.

== Cast ==
=== Main ===
- Gun Tieosuwan – Valen
- Pak Chavitpong Pusomjitsakul – Kaitoon
- Pan Norawit Bowonsantisut – Nont
- Ohm Napat Uthaha – King
- Tod Techit Panyanarapon – Peat

=== Supporting ===
- Ant Warinda Noenphoemphisut – Pangko
- Joseph Siraphat Boonrod – A‑Tom
- Namchok Thanan Apithanawong – Win
- Aton Thanakorn Techawicha – Ice
- Jeff Satur – Sean
- Got Suttiruk Srithongkul – Tang
- Jovi Sasiriya Xaivaivid – Toy
- Fah Wisansaya Pakasupakul – Nisa

== Broadcast ==
The series was aired on Channel 9 in Thailand and made available internationally through GagaOOLala.

== Reception ==
On MyDramaList, Love Area received a rating of 7.0/10 based on 3,612 users, while on IMDb it scored 6.1/10 from 144 reviews. Thai media highlighted the chemistry between the protagonists and the appeal of the romantic storyline. Komchadluek reported the positive reception of the first episode and fans’ anticipation for a continuation, while All Area Entertainment emphasized the Channel 9 premiere and the youthful cast. Khaosod noted the cultural impact and audience response.
