= Doctor's Mine =

2025 Thai television series

- หมอน่ารักคนนี้เป็นของผม
- Genre: Boys' love, Drama
- Based on: หมอน่ารักคนนี้เป็นของผม
- Directed by: Tharntup Katt
- Country of origin: Thailand
- Original language: Thai
- No. of episodes: 10

Production
- Running time: 56 min

Original release
- Network: YouTube; Viu
- Release: 20 July – 21 September 2025

Doctor's Mine (thai: หมอน่ารักคนนี้เป็นของผม) is a Thai BL television series released in 2025 on Kongthup Channel via YouTube and distributed by Viu, with an international version on GagaOOLala. The series premiered on 20 July 2025 and concluded on 21 September 2025, with ten weekly episodes. It ranked as the seventh most-watched BL title on GagaOOLala in 2025.

== Synopsis ==
Mind, a medical student, pretends to be in a relationship with Night, an engineering student, to escape an awkward situation. Meanwhile, Kan, also in medicine, deals with the aftermath of a one-night encounter with Per, an engineering student. Set against academic rivalries and personal challenges, the characters navigate friendship, desire, and self-discovery within the university environment.

== Cast and characters ==
=== Main ===
- Longshi Lee as Knight
- Chaiyapat Jumpasin (Arm) as Mild
- Taechin Phaisanwan (Mon) as Per
- Chavitpong Pusomjitsakul (Pak) as Kan
- Sumethee Mettaworakun (Top) as Tum
- Thanawat Sutthijaroen (Diamond) as Tonklah / Klah

=== Supporting ===
- Kornrawee Wongtrakul (Gun) as Natcha
- Ketsamanee Misapmakluea (Donut) as Great
- Puntakarn Weeravatesakul (Guy) as Mud
- Zen Youngblood (Napat) as Pat
- Meenay Jutai as Kullaya
- Sutima Kokiatwanit (Folk) as Por
- Supawit Vichitrananda (Pik) as Zeth
- Supitcha Limsommut (Ormsin) as Yiwa

== Broadcast ==
The series was aired on Kongthup Channel via YouTube and distributed by Viu in multiple versions (censored, R21, and uncut). Internationally, it was available on GagaOOLala. Media outlets such as BrickinfoTV reported on the trailer release and early audience reactions, while NineEntertain and INN News covered the premiere and fan reception.

== Reception ==
On MyDramaList, Doctor's Mine received a rating of 7.0/10 from 3,621 users, while on IMDb it scored 6.1/10 from 144 reviews. Thai media highlighted the chemistry between the leads and the appeal of the university setting. Naewna noted the series’ impact among younger audiences, MGR Online emphasized the promotional strategy and cast visibility, and Daily News reported on the positive reception and audience response.

== Promotion ==
Articles in Maya Channel highlighted Arm Chaiyapat’s performance, while Komchadluek published an analysis of the series’ impact. MintMag mentioned the title in a cultural context.
