= 21 Days Theory =

2022 Thai web series

- Official poster
- Thai: 21 วัน มีฉันมีเธอ
- Genre: Boys' love; Romantic comedy; Drama
- Screenplay by: Ekkarong Khumphromboon
- Directed by: Sittichai Chutsiri
- Starring: Bever Patsapon Jansuppakitkun; Khunakorn Sunantham
- Opening theme: "บังเอิญตั้งใจรัก" by Bell Warisara Jitpreedasakul
- Country of origin: Thailand
- Original language: Thai
- No. of episodes: 4

Production
- Producer: Anan Thanyarat
- Running time: 38 minutes
- Production company: Rookie Thailand

Original release
- Network: YouTube (Rookie Thailand)
- Release: 7 August – 28 August 2022

21 Days Theory (21 วัน มีฉันมีเธอ) is a 2022 Thai boys' love romantic comedy-drama web series produced by Rookie Thailand. Written by Ekkarong Khumphromboon and directed by Sittichai Chutsiri, it stars Patsapon Jansuppakitkun (Bever) and Khunakorn Sunantham (Tee), alongside Prat Itthichaicharoen, Bigboom Jirayu Sahguansin, Bell Warisara Jitpreedasakul and Bambam Pischapron Ketawattananon. The series was released on Rookie Thailand's official YouTube channel from 7 to 28 August 2022.

== Synopsis ==
Q is a high school student who dreams of achieving his goals but repeatedly fails at everything he tries. His life changes after meeting X, a popular and talented classmate admired by everyone. During an audition, X challenges Q to make Mook, a fellow student and social media influencer, invite him to an awards ceremony taking place in 21 days. If Q succeeds, he wins the bet; if he fails, he must grant one of X's wishes.

== Cast ==
=== Main ===
- Khunakorn Sunantham (Tee) as Q
- Patsapon Jansuppakitkun (Bever) as X

=== Supporting ===
- Prat Itthichaicharoen as Toy
- Bigboom Jirayu Sahguansin as Frank
- Bell Warisara Jitpreedasakul as Mind
- Sarawut Siriphet as Man
- Bambam Pischapron Ketawattananon as Mook

== Soundtrack ==
21 Days Theory Soundtrack
No.	Title	Artist	Length
1.	""บังเอิญตั้งใจรัก""	Bell Warisara Jitpreedasakul	3:25
2.	""บังเอิญตั้งใจรัก (Acoustic Version)""	Bever Patsapon Jansuppakitkun	3:43

== Production ==
21 Days Theory was produced by Rookie Thailand as an original boys' love romantic comedy aimed at young audiences. The series was written by Ekkarong Khumphromboon, directed by Sittichai Chutsiri, and produced by Anan Thanyarat. Its premise was inspired by the popular "21-day theory", the belief that a new habit or emotional attachment can develop over a period of three weeks.

The series premiered on 7 August 2022 and aired every Sunday at 20:00 (ICT) on Rookie Thailand's official YouTube channel. It concluded on 28 August 2022 after four episodes.

== Promotional events ==
Date	Event	Location	Ref.
7 August 2022	Official launch event featuring a press conference, cast introductions, musical performances and fan activities.	MCC Hall, The Mall Bangkapi, Bangkok	
