= The Cupid Coach =

2021 Thai television series

- Official poster
- Thai: โค้ชลับสลับรัก
- Genre: Boys' love; Fantasy; Romantic comedy
- Directed by: Phanuphon Saenboonsri; Jirapat Soonanon
- Starring: Khunakorn Sunantham; Nutchanon Juengdamrongkit; Chavitpong Pusomjitsakul
- Opening theme: "When Love Is Right" by Seksan Panprathip
- Country of origin: Thailand
- Original language: Thai
- No. of episodes: 12

Production
- Running time: 35 minutes
- Production company: Onzon Creative

Original release
- Network: LINE TV
- Release: 12 January – 30 March 2021

The Cupid Coach (โค้ชลับสลับรัก) is a 2021 Thai boys' love fantasy romantic comedy television series produced by Onzon Creative. Directed by Phanuphon Saenboonsri and Jirapat Soonanon, the series stars Khunakorn Sunantham (Tee), Nutchanon Juengdamrongkit (Peace), and Chavitpong Pusomjitsakul (Pak), alongside Pongphisut Tongsamut (Seua), Teerapat Somchaiya (X), and Areeya Jitwikham (Noey). It aired on LINE TV from 12 January to 30 March 2021.

== Synopsis ==
Tae (Tee Khunakorn Sunantham), a university football player, has secretly fallen in love with sports physiotherapist Bhudit (Seua Pongphisut Tongsamut). Hoping to help him win Bhudit's heart, his friend Namwhan (Noey Areeya Jitwikham) gives him a morganite gemstone and an edelweiss perfume said to grant wishes related to love. After performing the ritual, Tae accidentally summons the young cupid Morganite, known as Nite (Peace Nutchanon Juengdamrongkit), who offers to guide him in his search for true love. As the two grow closer, Tae finds himself caught between unrequited love, hidden feelings and unexpected changes in his relationships. After Nite suddenly disappears, Tae later encounters another young man also named Nite (Pak Varayu Phusomjitsakul), leading him to reconsider what love truly means.

== Cast ==
=== Main ===
- Khunakorn Sunantham (Tee) as Tae (Latte)
- Nutchanon Juengdamrongkit (Peace) as Nite (Morganite)
- Chavitpong Pusomjitsakul (Pak) as Petch (Morganite)
- Pongphisut Tongsamut (Seua) as Bhudit
- Teerapat Somchaiya (X) as Que
- Areeya Jitwikham (Noey) as Namwhan

=== Guest cast ===
- Jiraphan Chumphon as Coach Nat
- Wiwatthana Wannaphat as Aom
- Phupitchaya Khamphoemphun as Ming
- Charuwat Nasaeng as Sai
- Taweechok Sutmueang as Tala
- Phichanonsak Wongsaenkaeo as Bom
- Witchaya Srirueanthong as Ming
- Thanawat Phitthayawiwatkun as J-Bell

== Soundtrack ==
The Cupid Coach Soundtrack
No.	Title	Artist	Length
1.	""When Love Is Right""	Seksan Panprathip	4:44

== Production ==
The Cupid Coach was produced by Onzon Creative. Principal photography began in July 2020 following a traditional blessing ceremony held in Khon Kaen Province, officiated by astrologer Khatha Chinabanchorn. Producer Marut Phanomthonitchakun described the series as a romantic comedy in the boys' love genre featuring a cast made up largely of newcomers, many of them students at Khon Kaen University. The series was also produced to promote tourism and local culture in Khon Kaen Province through its filming locations.

In July 2020, cast members Khunakorn Sunantham, Nutchanon Juengdamrongkit, Pongphisut Tongsamut, Teerapat Somchaiya and Areeya Jitwikham attended a Premier League title celebration organized by the Liverpool Khon Kaen Supporters Club, where they promoted the series ahead of its premiere.

== Awards and nominations ==
Year	Award	Category	Work	Recipient	Result	Ref.
2021	Thailand Master Youth Awards	Rising Actor Award	The Cupid Coach	Khunakorn Sunantham	Won	
