= Taechin Phaisanwan =

Thai actor (born 1995)

- เตชินท์ ไพศาลวรรณ
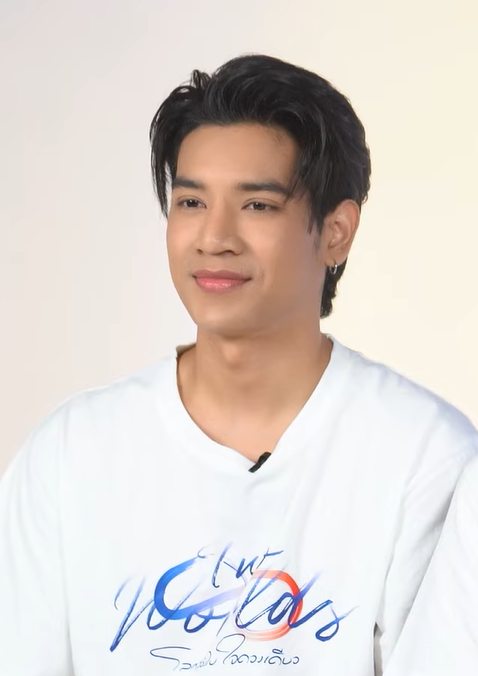
- Mon in 2024
- Born: Taechin Phaisanwan; 28 March 1995 (age 31); Korat (Nakhon Ratchasima), Thailand
- Other name: Mon (ม่อน)
- Education: Bangkok University (Communication Arts)
- Occupation: Actor
- Years active: 2022–present
- Agent: Kongthup Production

Taechin Phaisanwan (Thai: เตชินท์ ไพศาลวรรณ; born 28 March 1995), nicknamed Mon (Thai: ม่อน), is a Thai actor. He is known for his roles in series such as Two Worlds (2024), Apple My Love (2024), Knock Knock, Boys! (2024), Doctor's Mine (2025), and Mission to the Moon (2025).

== Biography and career ==
Mon was born in Korat (Nakhon Ratchasima), Thailand. He graduated in Communication Arts from Bangkok University. Before becoming an actor, Mon was a member of the boy group G Brothers.

He made his acting debut in 2023, playing Fos in the series Marry's Mission. In 2024, Mon signed a contract with Kongthup Production and played the supporting character Wayu, forming a secondary couple with actor Pak, in the series Two Worlds (2024). In 2025, Mon was announced as a lead in the series Mission to the Moon and Doctor's Mine, both co-starring Pak.

== Filmography ==
=== Television series ===
Year	Title	Role	Notes	Network/Platform	Ref.
2023	Marry's Mission	Fos	Supporting role		
2024	A Love So Beautiful	Jo	Supporting role	Viki	
2024	Knock Knock, Boys!	Sean	Supporting role	WeTV	
2024	Two Worlds	Wayu	Supporting role	iQIYI, Viki	
2025	(Your) Apple	To	Supporting role		
2025	Apple My Love	Toh	Supporting role	WeTV	
2025	Mission to the Moon	Sasin / Srisinvade	Main role	Kongthup Channel	
2025	Doctor's Mine	Per	Main role	MCOT, GagaOOLala	

== Awards and nominations ==
Year	Award	Category	Nominee(s)	Result	Ref.
2024	Phikhanesuan Awards (พิฆเนศวร) (Note: The Phikhanesuan Award (รางวัลพิฆเนศวร) is a national Thai media award for radio, television and film. It is organized by the Assembly of News Broadcasting and Newspaper Professionals of Thailand and is presented under the royal patronage of Somdet Phra Nyanasamvara, the former Supreme Patriarch of Thailand. The award was first established in 2012. (Thai Wikipedia article))	Best New BL Actor	Mon Taechin (shared with Pak Varayu) – Two Worlds	Won	
2025	Star International Awards	Couple of the Year	MonPak (Doctor's Mine)	Won	
