= The Eclipse (TV series) =

2022 Thai television series

- Official series poster
- คาธ
- Genre: Romantic drama; Boys' Love; Mystery
- Based on: คาธ Eclipse by Prapt
- Screenplay by: Apirak Chaipanha; Chotanan Kasamwonghong; Minta Bhanaparin
- Directed by: Tanwarin Sukkhapisit
- Starring: Kanaphan Puitrakul; Thanawat Rattanakitpaisan
- Opening theme: คลาด (Over The Moon) by Khaotung Thanawat
- Country of origin: Thailand
- Original language: Thai
- No. of seasons: 1
- No. of episodes: 12

Production
- Executive producers: Sataporn Panichraksapong; Darapa Choeysanguan
- Running time: 40–45 minutes
- Production company: GMMTV

Original release
- Network: GMM 25; Viu
- Release: August 12 – October 28, 2022

Related
- Our Skyy 2

The Eclipse (Thai: คาธ; RTGS: Khat) is a 2022 Thai boys' love television series starring Kanaphan Puitrakul and Thanawat Rattanakitpaisan. Directed by Tanwarin Sukkhapisit and produced by GMMTV. The series was announced at the GMMTV 2022: Borderless press event on December 1, 2021. The series premiered on GMM 25 and Viu on August 12, 2022, and concluded on October 28, 2022.

== Synopsis ==
One of the country's top schools, Suppalo, is a strictly governed all-boys secondary school. Rumour has it that there is a curse that punishes students who do not follow the school rules. And this mysterious curse will only increase as the eclipse approaches.

However, when a school has rules, there will always be a group of students who do not want to follow them. A group of students known as "The World Remembers" gang come together because they share the same ideology of not wanting to conform to Suppalo's old-fashioned rules and traditions and instead protest to demand their rights and fairness. Tasked with stopping the rule-breaking students, is head student prefect Akk (Kanaphan Puitrakul) and his friends Khanlong (Trai Nimtawat) and Wasuwat (Chayapol Jutamas).

Ayan (Thanawat Rattanakitpaisan) is a mysterious boy with a secretive past who has transferred to Suppalo from a rival secondary school, thus catching Akk's attention and he is immediately suspicious of Ayan's true intentions. But Ayan has come to Suppalo in hopes of discovering the truth behind his late uncle's suicide, and the only evidence he has, an old notebook, leads him straight to Suppalo.

== Cast and characters ==
=== Main ===
- Kanaphan Puitrakul (First) as Akk
- Thanawat Rattanakitpaisan (Khaotung) as Ayan

=== Supporting ===
- Trai Nimtawat (Neo) as Khanlong
- Thanawin Teeraphosukarn (Louis) as Thuaphu
- Chayapol Jutamas (AJ) as Wasuwat
- Thanik Kamontharanon (Pawin) as Namo
- Phatchatorn Thanawat (Ploypach) as Sani
- Vacharakiat Boonphakdee (Yai) as Chadok
- Inthira Charoenpura (Sine) as Waree
- Chavitpong Pusomjitsakul (Pak) as Jamnan
- Vitsarut Suwinijjit (Tee) as Jamnong
- Natthanon Petkaew (Petch) as Jamnian
- Amata Piyavanich (Jum) as Ayan's mother

== Episodes ==
| No. | Title | Original release date |
|---|---|---|
| 0 | "Special" | 5 August 2022 |
Interviews with the cast and director of The Eclipse featuring behind-the-scenes footage.
| 1 | "Episode 1" | 12 August 2022 |
New student Ayan arrives at Suppalo School, and the school's curse ramps up against the rule-defying gang "The World Remembers." Head prefect Akk is immediately suspicious of Ayan's disregard for school rules and habit of wandering the grounds.
| 2 | "Episode 2" | 19 August 2022 |
Questions about his romantic life make Akk uncomfortable, and he becomes further entangled with the new kid Ayan. Khan has a violent confrontation with some juniors after a homophobic comment about class president Thua.
| 3 | "Episode 3" | 26 August 2022 |
As pressure grows to end to the rule-breaking, Akk and Khan are disturbed to see Ayan and Thua together. Akk tries to get to the bottom of Ayan's motives when he visits Ayan's house to work on a school project.
| 4 | "Episode 4" | 2 September 2022 |
After a meeting led by Chadok, the teachers unite to punish Ayan with targeted questions. The punishment troubles Akk and Khan, who follow Ayan to a meeting with Thua in an effort to find out his motives.
| 5 | "Episode 5" | 9 September 2022 |
When Ayan's notebook goes missing from his locker, Ayan lashes out at Akk. Later, Ayan becomes convinced it couldn't have been Akk who committed the theft, and that Akk isn't as stuck up as he seems.
| 6 | "Episode 6" | 16 September 2022 |
After catching Akk in the act of sabotage, Ayan helps Akk escape the school undetected. The two spend the night together while Ayan tries to get the truth out of Akk. Meanwhile, Sani runs into Wat and has questions about his friend group.
| 7 | "Episode 7" | 23 September 2022 |
Ayan pressures Akk to divulge his secret, and Khan asks Ayan a revealing question. Khan, Wat, Ayan, Thua and Namo take a trip to Akk's home where they camp on the beach. On the beach, Ayan betrays his vulnerability when some innocent play dredges up a source of great pain.
| 8 | "Episode 8" | 30 September 2022 |
Ayan is forthright with Akk, who isn't ready to face his own feelings, let alone Ayan's. When Chadok dangles a conditional scholarship before him, Akk seems to take several steps backward. Khan leaps at the opportunity to partner with Thua in Judo.
| 9 | "Episode 9" | 7 October 2022 |
Akk learns more about Ayan when they begin spending all their spare time together. The school's director orders a crackdown on protestors and threatens the future of the student prefects. When the protestors seem to be gaining ground, a series of ghastly stunts begin to play out against them.
| 10 | "Episode 10" | 14 October 2022 |
Akk agrees to be Ayan's boyfriend and Khan wrestles with whether or not to reveal his secret identity to Thua. Ayan reaches a breaking point with Chadok.
| 11 | "Episode 11" | 21 October 2022 |
When the Suppalo students clash after a confrontation between the faculty and protestors, Thua steps out of the crowd to out Akk in more ways than one. With Akk's secrets out in the open, Ayan goes to Chadok with accusations of his own.
| 12 | "Episode 12" | 28 October 2022 |
As Akk and Thua face the consequences of their actions, the friend group finishes Wat's film. With little else to lose, Akk opens up to his parents with Ayan's unwavering support.

== Reception ==
=== Viewership ===
In the table below, the blue numbers represent the lowest rating and the red numbers represent the highest rating.

| Episode | Date | Timeslot (UTC+07:00) | Average audience share | Ref. |
|---|---|---|---|---|
| Special | August 5, 2022 | Friday 8:30 pm | 0.025% | |
| 1 | August 12, 2022 | Friday 8:30 pm | 0.051% | |
| 2 | August 19, 2022 | Friday 8:30 pm | 0.040% | |
| 3 | August 26, 2022 | Friday 8:30 pm | | |
| 4 | September 2, 2022 | Friday 8:30 pm | | |
| 5 | September 9, 2022 | Friday 8:30 pm | | |
| 6 | September 16, 2022 | Friday 8:30 pm | | |
| 7 | September 23, 2022 | Friday 8:30 pm | | |
| 8 | September 30, 2022 | Friday 8:30 pm | | |
| 9 | October 7, 2022 | Friday 8:30 pm | | |
| 10 | October 14, 2022 | Friday 8:30 pm | | |
| 11 | October 21, 2022 | Friday 8:30 pm | | |
| 12 | October 28, 2022 | Friday 8:30 pm | | |

=== Accolades ===
| Year | Awards | Category | Result | Ref |
|---|---|---|---|---|
| 2022 | Thai Digital Awards | Best BL Series | Won | |
| 2023 | 8th Golden Kinnaree | Outstanding Screenwriter | Won | |
| 2023 | 8th Golden Kinnaree | Outstanding Director | Won | |
| 2023 | 2023 ContentAsia Awards | Best Asian LGBTQ+ Programme | Bronze | |
| 2024 | 28th Asian Television Awards | Best Theme Song | Nominated | |

== Future ==
In 2023, The Eclipse was included in the anthology series Our Skyy 2. The two episodes feature the actors of Akk, Ayan, Khanlong, Thuaphu, Wasuwat, and Namo, reprising their roles as the friend group takes a trip together to shoot a short film after graduating high school.
