= Patsapon Jansuppakitkun =

Thai actor and singer (born 1998)

- พรรษพล เจนสรรพกิจกุล
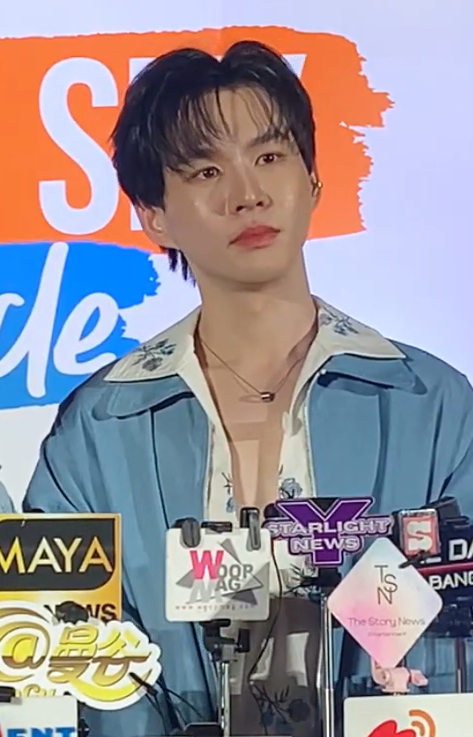
- Bever in 2026
- Born: 7 September 1998 (age 27); Thailand
- Other name: Bever (บีเวอร์)
- Education: Srinakharinwirot University
- Occupations: Actor; Singer
- Years active: 2020–present

Patsapon Jansuppakitkun (Thai: พรรษพล เจนสรรพกิจกุล; born 7 September 1998), nicknamed Bever (Thai: บีเวอร์), is a Thai actor and singer. He made his acting debut in 2020 by appearing in the series En of Love: TOSSARA and En of Love: Love Mechanics. He became known for his roles in Love Mechanics (2022), 21 Days Theory (2022), Future (2023), Fourever You (2024), and Beside the Sky (2025). In 2026, he also joined the cast of the series Be My Player Two.

== Biography ==
Patsapon Jansuppakitkun was born on 7 September 1998 in Thailand. He attended Wat Suthiwararam School before enrolling at the Faculty of Social Business Administration at Srinakharinwirot University, where he graduated.

Bever made his acting debut in 2020, portraying James in the series En of Love: TOSSARA and En of Love: Love Mechanics. In 2022, he landed his first leading role, portraying X in 21 Days Theory, opposite Khunakorn Sunantham (Tee). The pair became known among fans as the ship BeverTeerex.

During the broadcast of the series, Bever also began his singing career by performing บังเอิญตั้งใจรัก, the main theme song for 21 Days Theory.

In 2023, he portrayed James in Future and recorded the song ปีนไม่ไหว, which was used as the series' soundtrack. Later that year, he appeared in the series Absolute Zero. In 2024, he portrayed Tonfah in Fourever You. In 2025, he starred in the BL series Beside the Sky (Fourever You 2), opposite Methaphat Chimkul (Tonliew), with whom he formed the ship BeverTonliew.

== Filmography ==
=== Television ===
Year	Title	Role	Notes	Network / Platform
2020	En of Love: TOSSARA	James	Supporting role	LINE TV
2020	En of Love: Love Mechanics	James	Supporting role	LINE TV
2021	The Best Story	Tar	Supporting role	Rookie Thailand
2022	Love Mechanics	James	Supporting role	WeTV
2022	21 Days Theory	X	Main role	Rookie Thailand
2023	Future	James	Main cast	Rookie Thailand, MCOT
2023	Absolute Zero	Mangkorn	Supporting role	iQIYI
2024	The Rule	Pod	Supporting role	YouTube
2024	Fourever You	Tonfah ("Fah")	Main cast	WeTV
2026	Beside the Sky: Fourever You 2	Tonfah ("Fah")	Main role	WeTV
2026	My Summer Internship	Moc	Main role	YouTube
2026	Be My Player Two	Kim ("Kimkade") / Blue Viper	Supporting role	WeTV

== Discography ==
=== Singles ===
Year	Title	Album	Notes
2022	บังเอิญตั้งใจรัก	21 Days Theory (Original Soundtrack)	Solo single.
2023	ปีนไม่ไหว	Future(Original Soundtrack)	Solo single.

=== Soundtracks ===
Year	Song	Series	Notes
2022	บังเอิญตั้งใจรัก	21 Days Theory	Main performer.
2023	ปีนไม่ไหว	Future	Main performer.
2025	FOREVER YOU	Fourever You	Participating artist.
2026	ใต้ฟ้าเดียวกัน	Beside the Sky	Participating artist.

=== Music videos ===
Year	Title	Artist	Album	Ref.
2022	บังเอิญตั้งใจรัก (Acoustic Version)	Bever Patsapon	21 Days Theory (Original Soundtrack)	
2025	ใต้ฟ้าเดียวกัน	Bever Patsapon and Tonliew Methaphat	Beside the Sky (Original Soundtrack)	
