= Police in Love =

2026 Thai television series

- Official series poster
- Thai: ที่รักสารวัตรเธียร์
- Genre: Boys' love; Romantic comedy; Drama
- Screenplay by: Sarun Kaensap; Pacharawan Chaipuwarat; Nuttamon Yimyaem
- Directed by: Tichakorn Phukhaotong
- Starring: Anan Wong; Wanarat Ratsameerat
- Country of origin: Thailand
- Original language: Thai
- No. of episodes: 12

Production
- Executive producers: Patchara Kongsaming; Panuwat Palachigo
- Producers: Rujisa Wilairat; Rattanatorn Kritsanamontri
- Cinematography: Rath Roongrueangtantisook; Khanathip Chaiyawan
- Running time: 48–64 minutes
- Production company: Moongdoo Production

Original release
- Network: WeTV
- Release: 12 September 2026 – present

Police in Love (Thai: ที่รักสารวัตรเธียร์; RTGS: Thirak Sarawat Thia, lit. 'Darling [of] Inspector Thear') is a 2026 Thai boys' love romantic comedy television series, directed by Tichakorn Phukhaotong (Jojo), starring Wanarat Ratsameerat (War) and Anan Wong (Yin).

The series premiered on WeTV on 12 September 2026, airing on Saturdays at 20:00 ICT.

== Plot ==
The series follows Mungkorn Phianwanich and Thear Theartha Phiromsamorn, two characters whose lives become intertwined amid situations involving the police and romantic feelings. The story combines romance and comedy and marks the return of Wanarat Ratsameerat (War) and Anan Wong (Yin) as the main pairing.

== Cast and characters ==
=== Main ===
- Anan Wong (Yin) as Theartha Phiromsamorn (Thear)
- Wanarat Ratsameerat (War) as Mungkorn Phianwanich

=== Supporting ===
- Rojanin Kulphatthanaphon (Shane) as Phuwin Siriyotha
- Thapanat Athikompokin (Boss) as Lukplub Phanphoprak
- Ronnakit Tantiwilai (Kit) as Khanin Sritprasom
- Chinadis Weangwises (Tang) as Nadol Sitprasoet
- Darvid Kreepolrerk (Tae) as Saming

=== Guest ===
- Thanaporn Wagprayoon (Parn) as Thear's mother
- Jirawat Vongdilokvath (Mai) as Cupid
- Nichaphat Chatchaipholrat (Pearwah) as Belle

== Soundtrack ==
Police in Love Soundtrack
No.	Title	Writer(s)	Artist	Length
1.	"ล้มดีล"	Krittikorn Pornsatit	Marckris (BUS)	3:08
2.	"น่ารักเกินกำหนด"	Worachet Thanupongcharat (Bnz); Dome Jaruwat	Pixxie	2:52
3.	"อย่าให้คิดเอง"	Aran Nongpon; Worachet Thanupongcharat (Bnz)	War Wanarat	3:51

== Production ==
The series' launch ceremony and press conference were held in August 2026, with the main and supporting cast in attendance.

The series aired on Saturdays at 20:00 ICT on WeTV, beginning on 12 September 2026. During its broadcast period, the production has also announced additional content, including live broadcasts before the episodes, fan discussion sessions after the episodes, cast reaction videos, recaps and behind-the-scenes content.
