= Jack & Joker: U Steal My Heart! =

2024 Thai television series

- Official series poster
- Thai: แจ็คกับโจ๊กเกอร์ ทําไมต้องเป็นเธอทุกที
- Genre: Romantic comedy; Boys' Love (BL)
- Directed by: Tee Bundit Sintanaparadee
- Starring: Anan Wong; Wanarat Ratsameerat
- Country of origin: Thailand
- Original language: Thai
- No. of episodes: 12

Production
- Producer: YWPB (now ARGENTIS)
- Running time: 45–50 minutes

Original release
- Network: Channel 3 HD iQIYI
- Release: 9 September – 25 November 2024

Jack & Joker: U Steal My Heart! (ทําไมต้องเป็นเธอทุกที) is a 2024 Thai television series starring Anan Wong (Yin) and Wanarat Ratsameerat (War). Directed by Bundit Sintanaparadee (Tee) and co-produced by Channel 3 and iQIYI, it officially premiered on September 9, 2024 on Channel 3, airing on Mondays at 10:45pm IST (10:45pm). It ended on November 25, 2024, after 12 episodes. A special episode was released on February 22, 2025.

== Synopsis ==
Joker is a notorious thief and wanted by the police. Joker used his excellent disguise skills to steal wealth from wealthy businessmen and distribute it to poor residents. Jack was once a substitute taekwondo athlete and later became a debt collector. Jack's presence is intimidating, but he never uses force to solve problems and is a firm believer in "using his own power to protect the weak."

Fate unites two men in a love-hate relationship as they collaborate on a major heist.

== Cast and characters ==
=== Main ===
- Anan Wong (Yin) as Jack
- Wanarat Ratsameerat (War) as Joker

=== Supporting ===
- Ratchapat Worrasarn (Prom) as a Tattoo
- Nadol Lamprasert (Bonz) as Hoy
- Siwat Jumlongkul (Mark) as Aran
- Peerawich Ploynumpol (Pee) as Hope
- Netipat luksanavisis (Ne) as Save
- Nathanan Akkharakitwattanakul (Zorzo) as Rosé
- Chatchawit Techarukpong (Victor) as Carbon
- Sarunyoo Prachakit (Beam) as Boss
- Chanokwanun Rakcheep (Took) as Nang
- Suporn Sangkaphibal (Nui) as Jack's grandmother

=== Guest ===
- Paramej Noiam (Plai) as Joker's father
- Wacharin Anantapong (Rina) as Joker's mother
- Saran Naksodsi as Nulek
- Chananticha Chaipa (Tangkwa) as Toi Ting
- Jennie Panhan
- Thamrong Cunpisut (Pharaoh)
- Wachara Kanha (Guide)
- Gandhi Wasuwitchayagit
- Chertsak Pratumsrisakhon
- Khunnapat Pichetworawut (Pond)

== Production ==
Jack & Joker was created and produced by YWPB, a production company co-founded by Anan Wong and Wanarat Ratsameerat. The project was announced in mid-2023 and promoted heavily through fan events and online platforms. The series was filmed primarily in Bangkok. It aired weekly on Channel 3 HD and was simulcast on iQIYI.

== Episodes ==
The series aired 12 episodes from 9 September to 25 November 2024. A special episode titled Jack & Joker: Special Episode premiered in selected Theaters on 22 February 2025, and to the public on 1 March 2025.

== Reception ==
Jack & Joker received positive reviews for its chemistry between leads, character development, and mix of humor and emotional depth. The series trended regularly on Thai Twitter and became one of iQIYI Thailand’s most-watched BL titles in Q1 2024.

== Original soundtrack ==
The following songs appear in the episode "The Thief of Hearts" of the series Jack & Joker: U Steal My Heart!:

Soundtrack Listing
	Track title	Artist	Duration
1	แค่ยัง… (มีเธอ) “As Long As I Have You”	Tattoo Colour	3:45
2	ทำไมต้องเป็นเธอ “Why It Has To Be You”	Jaruwat Cheawaram	4:14
3	ร้อยวิธี “One Hundred Ways”	Wanarat Ratsameerat	4:00

== Awards and nominations ==
Year	Award	Category	Recipient	Result
2024	Thailand Box Office Awards	Best BL Drama of the Year	Jack & Joker: U Steal My Heart!	Won
2024	BL Army PH Awards	Best Actor	Anan Wong (for Jack & Joker)	Won
