= Wanarat Ratsameerat =

Thai actor (born 1994)

- วอร์ วนรัตน์ รัศมีรัตน์
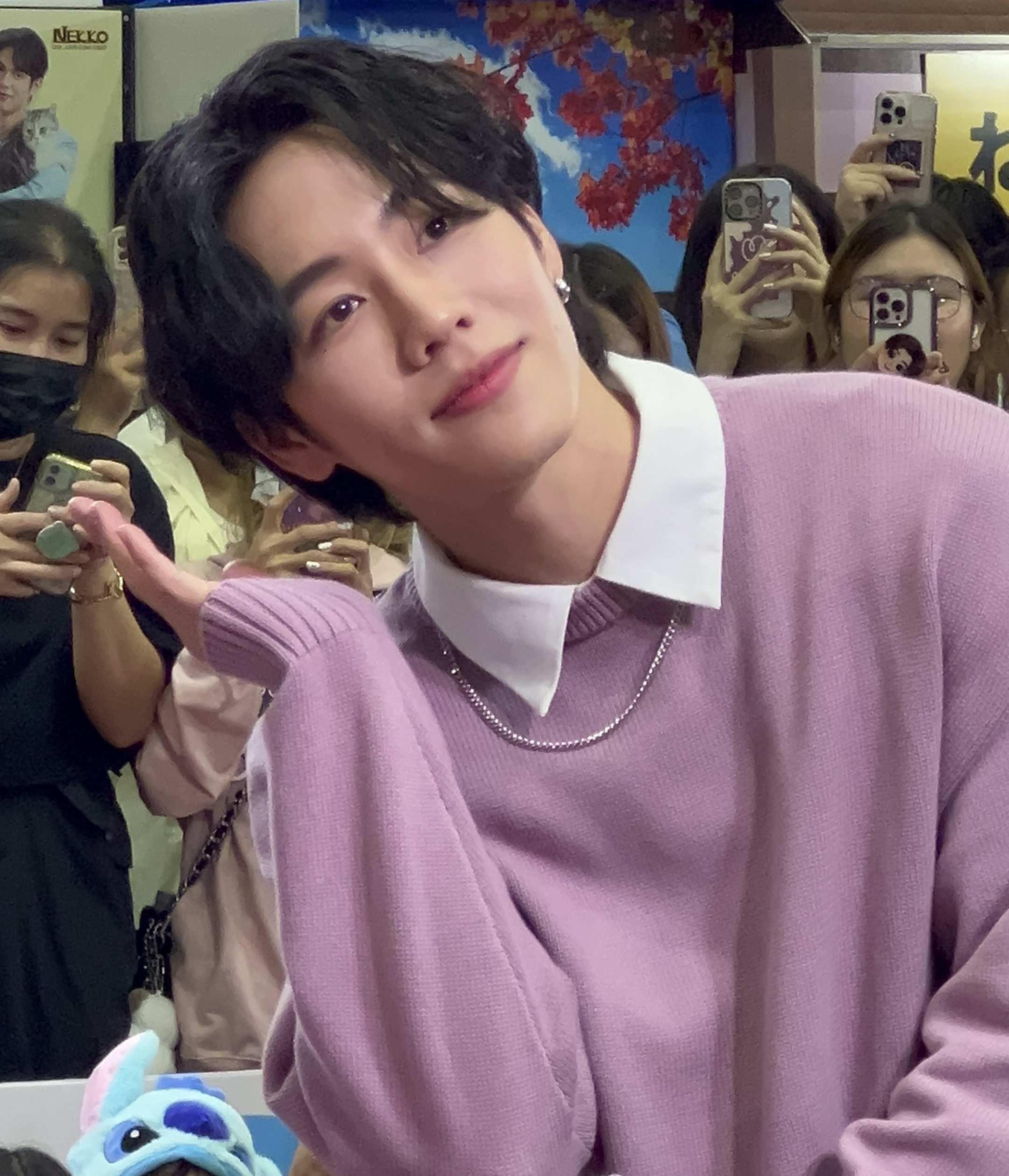
- Wanarat in 2023
- Born: 23 June 1994 (age 32); Khon Kaen, Thailand
- Other name: War
- Occupations: Actor; singer; ceramic artist
- Years active: 2016–present
- Agent: Rookie Thailand (2018–2022)

Wanarat Ratsameerat (Thai: วอร์ วนรัตน์ รัศมีรัตน์ ; born 23 June 1994), nicknamed War (Thai: วอร์), is a Thai actor. He is known for his roles in En of Love: Love Mechanics (2020), Love Mechanics (2022), and Jack & Joker: U Steal My Heart! (2024). Police in love (2026).

== Career ==
He made his acting debut in 2016, in the film The Right Man: Because I Love You. In 2022, he starred in the series Love Mechanics on WeTV. In 2024, he starred in the BL series Jack & Joker: U Steal My Heart!. In 2026, he stars in the series Police in Love, also on WeTV.

== Filmography ==
=== Film ===
Year	Title	Role	Notes
2016	The Right Man: Because I Love You	Than	Main role
2022	Pah Phee Bok	Achi/Bakkhun	Main role
2024	Taklee Genesis	Kong	Main role

=== Television series ===
Year	Title	Role	Channel	Notes	Ref.
2017	Onli(n)e	Tep		Supporting role	
2018	Transistor Love Story	Don	GMM 25	Supporting role	
2018	Way Back Home	Kit	Channel 3	Guest role	
2020	En of Love: Love Mechanics	Mark	Line TV	Main role	
2020	En of Love: This Is Love Story	Mark	Line TV	Supporting role	
2021	The Best Story	Best	Line TV	Main role	
2022	Love Mechanics	Mark	WeTV	Main role	
2024	Naka De Salon	Sut	Channel 3	Main role	
2024	Jack & Joker: U Steal My Heart!	"Joke" Jomthap Khongsuk / Joker	Channel 3	Main role	
2026	Police in Love	Mungkorn Phianwanich	WeTV	Main role	

== Awards and nominations ==
Award nominations for Wanarat Ratsameerat
Year	Award	Category	Nominee(s)	Result	Ref.
2021	Kazz Awards 2021	Young Actor of the Year	—	Won	
2021	Siam Series Awards 2021	Most Popular New Actor	—	Won	
2021	Yniverse Awards 2020	Yniverse Couple	En of Love: Love Mechanics	Won	
2021	T-Pop Stage	Rookie of the Week (Week 7)	อ้อนไม่เก่ง (On Mai Keng)	Won	
2021	T-Pop Stage	Rookie of the Week (Week 8)	อ้อนไม่เก่ง (On Mai Keng)	Won	
2024	CBLO Awards 2024	Popularity Award	—	Won	
2024	Thailand Box Office Awards 2024	Best Supporting Actor	Taklee Genesis	Nominated	
