= Varayu Phusomjitsakul =

Thai actor (born 1997)

- ชวิศพงศ์ พูสมจิตสกุล
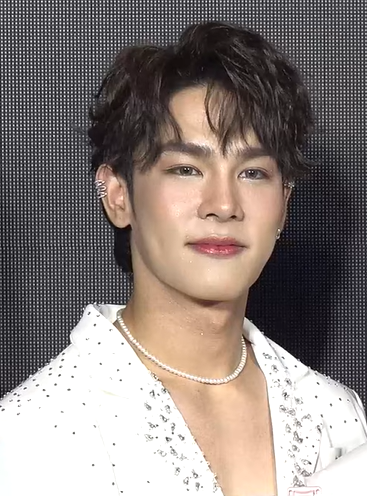
- Pak in 2024
- Born: Chavitpong Pusomjitsakul; October 16, 1997 (age 28); Thailand
- Other name: Pak (ภัค)
- Occupation: Actor
- Years active: 2021–present

Varayu Phusomjitsakul (Thai: ชวิศพงศ์ พูสมจิตสกุล; born 16 October 1997), nicknamed Pak (Thai: ภัค), is a Thai actor. He is best known for starring in the BL series Love Area (2021), Love Area Part 2 (2022), Mission to the Moon (2025) and Doctor's Mine (2025). He also appeared in productions such as Two Worlds (2024), The Eclipse and Knock Knock, Boys! (2024).

== Career ==
Pak began his career in 2021 as the lead actor in the BL series Love Area , playing the character Kaitoon. The success of the production led to the continuation Love Area Part 2 in 2022.

In 2022, he was announced as part of the cast of the series Boy Never Smiles (รักสุดท้าย…นายไม่ยิ้ม). In 2022, he appeared in The Eclipse as Jamnan, a supporting role in one of the most acclaimed BL series of the year.

In the following years, he expanded his acting to different genres, including Knock Knock, Boys! (2024) and Two Worlds (2024).In 2025, he starred in Doctor's Mine as Kan, and Mission to the Moon as Narvi.

== Filmography ==
Year	Title	Role	Billing	Network / Platform	Ref.
2021	The Cupid Coach	Morganite / Nite (Ep. 9–12)	Main	Line TV	
2021	Love Area	Kaitoon	Main	Amarin TV HD 34	
2022	Love Area 2	Kaitoon	Main	Amarin TV HD 34	
2022	Love Area 2: Director's Cut	Kaitoon	Main	GagaOOLala	
2022	Ai Long Nhai	—	Supporting	Channel 3 iQIYI	
2022	The Eclipse	Jamnan	Supporting	GMM 25; Viu	
2023	Make a Wish	—	Supporting	GMM 25; Viu	
2023	Crazy Handsome Rich	"Sin" Sinsorn Jongjongrak	Supporting	YouTube (COPY A BANGKOK)	
2023	Marry's Mission	Toy	Supporting	YouTube	
2024	Two Worlds	Jao	Supporting	iQIYI; Viki	
2024	Knock Knock, Boys!	Jumper	Supporting	WeTV	
2024	A Love So Beautiful	Mok	Guest	YouTube	
2024	Apple	Jessada	Guest	Channel 3; 3Plus	
2024	Apple My Love (Uncut Ver.)	Jessada	Guest	GagaOOLala	
2025	Mission to the Moon	Narvi	Main	YouTube (Kongthup Production)	
2025	Doctor's Mine	Kan	Main	Viu; GagaOOLala (international)	

== Awards and nominations ==
Year	Award	Category	Nominee(s)	Result	Ref.
2024	Phikhanesuan Awards (พิฆเนศวร) (Note: The Phikhanesuan Award (รางวัลพิฆเนศวร) is a national Thai media award for radio, television and film. It is organized by the Assembly of News Broadcasting and Newspaper Professionals of Thailand and is presented under the royal patronage of Somdet Phra Nyanasamvara, the former Supreme Patriarch of Thailand. The award was first established in 2012. (Thai Wikipedia article))	Best New BL Actor	Varayu Phusomjitsakul (shared with Mon Taechin) – Two Worlds	Won	
2025	Star International Awards	Couple of the Year	MonPak (Doctor's Mine)	Won	
