= Love Mechanics =

2022 Thai television series

- กลรักรุ่นพี่
- Genre: Romance, Drama
- Based on: Love Mechanics by Faddist
- Written by: Bee Pongsate Lucksameepong, Brook Natthakorn Julrasorn
- Directed by: Lit Phadung Samajarn
- Starring: Anan Wong; Wanarat Ratsameerat
- Country of origin: Thailand
- Original language: Thai
- No. of seasons: 1
- No. of episodes: 10

Production
- Executive producer: Li Kai Chen
- Producers: Li Kai Chen, Tanva Panpim
- Production company: Studio Wabi Sabi

Original release
- Release: June 18 – August 6, 2022

Related
- En of Love: Love Mechanics (mini-series)

Love Mechanics (Thai: กลรักรุ่นพี่; RTGS: Kon Rak Run Phi) is a 2022 Thai romantic drama television series directed by Lit Phadung Samajarn and starring Anan Wong (Yin) and Wanarat Ratsameerat (War). It is an expanded adaptation of the popular 2020 mini-series En of Love: Love Mechanics, which was originally adapted from a web novel and formed part of the En of Love anthology. The series aired as a WeTV Original from June 18, 2022, to August 6, 2022, on WeTV.

== Synopsis ==
The series follows the complex tangled relationship between Vee (Anan Wong), a senior engineering student who has a girlfriend, and Mark (Wanarat Ratsameerat), a junior from his faculty. Their conflict initially arises when Mark develops feelings for Vee's friend, Bar, who is already dating Tossakan. Vee attempts to keep Mark away from Bar, but after a misunderstanding and an alcohol-fueled one-night stand, Vee and Mark find themselves unexpectedly entangled in a passionate affair. Vee struggles immensely with his existing long-term relationship with Ploy (Veerinsara Tangkitsuvanich) and his rapidly growing feelings for Mark, leading to internal conflict and ambiguity. Meanwhile, Mark grapples with the pain of being a "second choice" and the intense emotions he develops for Vee. Their journey is marked by infidelity, trust issues, and the complexities of love. Amidst their internal conflicts and external pressures, Mark opens his heart to other potential relationships, including with another senior, Nuea (Ratchaphat Worrasarn), and his ex-boyfriend, Pack (Rit Rueangrit Siriphanit), who hopes for a reconciliation. The narrative explores how this tangled love story concludes and who Mark ultimately chooses.

== Cast and characters ==
=== Main ===
- Anan Wong (Yin) as Vee
- Wanarat Ratsameerat (War) as Mark

=== Supporting ===
- Veerinsara Tangkitsuvanich (Perth) as Ploy
- Ratchaphat Worrasarn (Prom) as Nuea
- Kanidsorn Laiwrakoran (Got) as Bar
- Nathadej Pititranun (Jeff) as Kan Thotsakan
- Supitcha Limsommut (Ormsin) as Yiwaa
- Thamrong Cunpisut (Pharaoh) as Tee
- Saran Naksodsi as Lee
- Wongrapee Krusong (Aomsin) as Pond
- Prat Itthichaicharoen as Tonkla
- Natthapat Chanchaisombat (Boom) as Fuse
- Thanakom Minthananan (Win) as Kamphan
- Patsapon Jansuppakitkun (Bever) as James
- Ratchapong Anomakiti (Poppy) as Ton
- Nadol Lamprasert (Bonz) as Yoo
- Thammasiri Umpujh (Frong) as Wind

=== Guest ===
- Pattarabut Kiennukul (AA) as Krat (Locker room guy) (Ep. 3, 9)
- Siwat Jumlongkul (Mark) as Man at market (Ep. 5)
- Jirayu Sahguansin (Bigboom) as Dr. Ana (Ep. 6)
- Rueangritz Siriphanit (Ritz) as Pack (Mark's ex) (Ep. 8)
- Namthip Siamthong as Mark's mother (Ep. 8, 10)
- Krittawat Suwanich (Toosafe) as Thewpai
- Phutharit Prombandal (Wit) as Vee's father

== Production ==
Love Mechanics is an extended version of the four-episode segment of the same name from the 2020 anthology series En of Love. Due to the overwhelming popular demand from fans for a full-length series, the project was revived three years after its initial mini-series run as a WeTV Original series, being highlighted as part of the WeTV Original 2022 Line Up. Produced by Studio Wabi Sabi, this extended version reunited the original main cast, including Yin Anan Wong and War Wanarat Ratsameerat in their leading roles, and director Lit Phadung Samachar. The full series allowed for a more in-depth exploration of the characters' emotions and the story's complexities, and filming was completed by February 2022.

As part of the production, a blessing ceremony (บวงสรวง) was held at the Ganesha Shrine in Union Mall on May 21, 2022, attended by the cast and crew, as well as a large number of fans. The series aired as a WeTV Original every Saturday at 9:00 PM (21:00) from June 18, 2022, to August 6, 2022, on WeTV.

== Reception ==
Love Mechanics garnered significant attention and positive feedback from viewers, particularly for its portrayal of a complex romantic relationship and the strong chemistry between the lead actors, Yin Anan Wong and War Wanarat Ratsameerat. The series achieved substantial viewership of the original En of Love project on LINE TV, which accumulated 40 million views across its eight episodes, including Love Mechanics. The final episode of Love Mechanics alone attracted 500,000 views within hours of its broadcast. The series also benefited from high anticipation due to its origin as a popular web novel, with the casting choices being well-received by fans, leading to significant online activity for events such as its blessing ceremony, which also trended globally.

Following the success of the En of Love anthology, lead actors Yin Anan Wong and War Wanarat Ratsameerat participated in the 'EN of Love Live Fan Meeting 'Eternally' in 2020, an event that brought together the main cast members from across the entire series.

== Awards and nominations ==
Year	Award	Category	Recipient(s) / Nominee(s)	Result	Ref
2022	14th Nataraja Awards	Drama Series of The Year (Audience Vote)	Love Mechanics	Won	

== Soundtrack ==
The series features several original soundtrack songs, some performed by the cast members.

- "แค่ของเลียนแบบ" (Kae Kong Lean Baep / Just a Fake Thing) by War Wanarat
- "Mist" by Silly Fools x Zeal
- "เศษผม" (Set Pom / Hair Shreds) by Jay Phitiwat
- "เข้าใจผิด" (Kao Jai Pid / Misunderstanding) by Jay Phitiwat
- "ไม่หึง ไม่ไหวหรอก" (Mai Heung Mai Wai Rok / Can't Help Being Jealous) by Prom Ratchaphat
- "หวานเกินไป" (Waan Gern Pai / Too Sweet) by Bonnadol
