= Paradys =

Paradys may refer to:

- The proper name of the star Alpha Apodis
- Secret Books of Paradys, a book series; see Tanith Lee bibliography

== See also ==
- Paradise (disambiguation)
- Paradis
- Parady
