= Paradis =

Paradis may refer to:

== Places ==
=== Belgium ===
- Paradis (Charleroi Metro), a Belgian railway station located in Fontaine-l'Évêque

=== Canada ===
- Paradis, Quebec, Canada
- Paradise Lake (Quebec) or Lac Paradis, Canada

=== Iran ===
- Paradis, Iran, a village

=== Norway ===
- Paradis, Bergen, a neighborhood in the city of Bergen in Vestland county
  - Paradis (station), a Bergen Light Rail station - see List of Bergen Light Rail stations
- Paradis (Kristiansand), a neighborhood in the city of Kristiansand in Agder county
- Paradis, Rogaland, a neighborhood in the city of Stavanger in Rogaland county
  - Paradis Station, a railway station in Paradis, Rogaland

=== Saint Martin ===
- Pic Paradis, the highest point on the Caribbean island of Saint Martin, an overseas collectivity of France

=== United States ===
- Paradis, Louisiana, United States, a census-designated place

== Other uses ==
- Paradis (duo), French electronic music duo
- Paradis (surname), a list of people whose surname is Paradis
- Paradis (novel), a 1981 novel by Philippe Sollers
- Tour Paradis (Paradise Tower), a skyscraper in Liege, Belgium
- Paradis, the French name for the gods, the highest viewing area in a theatre
- Paradis Island, a fictional island that is the setting for the anime and manga Attack on Titan

== See also ==
- Paradise (disambiguation)
- Paradiso (disambiguation)
