= Parady =

Parady is a surname. Notable people with the surname include:

- Hersha Parady (1945–2023), American actress
- Jim Parady (born 1961), American football player and coach

== See also ==
- Paradies (disambiguation)
- Paradis (disambiguation)
- Pardy, a surname
