= Paradisia =

Paradisia may refer to:

- Paradisia Alpine Botanical Garden, also known as Giardino Alpino Paradisia or Jardin alpin Paradisia, a nature preserve and botanical garden in the Gran Paradiso National Park in Cogne, Italy
- Paradisia, a 1987 film by Marcy Page
- Paradisia, a fictional planet featuring in season 3 of Galactik Football
- "Paradisia", a song by Björk from the 2017 album Utopia

== See also ==
- Paradeisia, Arcadia, a village and a community in the municipality of Megalopoli, Greece
- Paradisea (paradise lily), a European genus of flowering plants
- Paradisio, a Belgian eurodance group
- Paradiso (disambiguation)
