= Artillerivollen =

- Neighborhood
- View of the neighborhood
- Interactive map of Artillerivollen
- Coordinates: 58.1535°N 07.9766°E
- Country: Norway
- County: Agder
- Municipality: Kristiansand
- Borough: Grim
- District: Grim
- Elevation: 3 m (9.8 ft)
- Time zone: UTC+01:00 (CET)
  - Summer (DST): UTC+02:00 (CEST)
- Postal code: 4616
- Area code: 38

Artillerivollen is a neighbourhood in the city of Kristiansand in Agder county, Norway. It is located in the borough of Grim and in the district of Grim. Artillerivollen is north of Grimsmyra and the Norwegian National Road 9, and east of Enrum.

== Transport ==
Roads through Artillerivollen
Line	Destination
Norwegian National Road 9	Kristiansand - Evje

Bus lines through Artillerivollen
Line	Destination
13	Grimsmyra - Lund
