= Paradiso (disambiguation) =

Paradiso is the third part of Dante's Divine Comedy.

Paradiso may also refer to:

== Music ==
- Paradiso (Amsterdam), a music venue in the Netherlands
- Paradiso Festival, an annual music festival at the Gorge Amphitheatre in George, Washington, U.S.

=== Albums ===
- Paradiso (Chino Amobi album) or the title song, 2017
- Paradiso (Fiction Plane album), 2009
- Paradiso (Hayley Westenra album), 2011
- Paradiso (Lucio Battisti Songbook), by Mina, 2018
- Paradiso, by the Sloppy Boys, 2020
- Paradiso, by Tangerine Dream, 2006

=== Songs ===
- "Paradiso" (song), by Marika Gombitová, 1994
- "(If Paradise Is) Half as Nice", a song by Lucio Battisti also known as "Il paradiso"
- "Paradiso", by Azealia Banks from Fantasea, 2012
- "Paradiso", by Connie Francis, 1962

== Places ==
- Paradiso, Ticino, a municipality in Switzerland
- Lugano-Paradiso railway station
- Paradiso (Turin Metro), a rail station in Turin, Italy
- Paradiso railway station (Luxembourg)

== Other uses ==
- Paradiso (novel), a 1966 novel by José Lezama Lima
- Paradiso (surname), including a list of people with the surname
- Paradiso (immersive theater experience), a theatrical experience in New York City
- Il Paradiso, a painting on canvas by Jacopo Robusti best known as Tintoretto

== See also ==
- Paradisio, a Belgian dance act
- Paradis (disambiguation)
- Paradise (disambiguation)
- Paraíso (disambiguation)
