= Klappane =

- Neighborhood in Kristiansand
- Interactive map of Klappane
- Coordinates: 58.1518°N 07.9676°E
- Country: Norway
- County: Agder
- Municipality: Kristiansand
- Borough: Grim
- District: Grim
- Elevation: 21 m (69 ft)
- Time zone: UTC+01:00 (CET)
  - Summer (DST): UTC+02:00 (CEST)
- Postal code: 4617
- Area code: 38

Klappane is a neighbourhood in the city of Kristiansand in Agder county, Norway. It is located in the borough of Grim and in the district of Grim. It's located on the north side of the Norwegian National Road 9, just south of Paradis, southwest of Enrum and northwest of Grim torv.
