= Paradis (surname) =

Paradis is a surname. Notable people with the surname include:

- Alysson Paradis (born 1984), French actress
- Carly Paradis, Canadian composer and pianist
- Caterina Albert i Paradis (1869-1966), Spanish writer under the pen name Víctor Català
- Christian Paradis (born 1974), Canadian politician
- Denis Paradis (born 1949), Canadian politician
- Élisabeth Paradis (born 1992), Canadian ice dancer
- François Paradis, Canadian politician elected to the National Assembly of Quebec in 2014
- François-Xavier Paradis (1844–1910), Canadian politician
- Jean Jacques Paradis CMM, CD (1928–2007), the Commander, Mobile Command of the Canadian Forces
- Judy Paradis (born 1944), American politician from Maine
- Louis Paradis (born 1959), Canadian comics artist, writer and illustrator
- Manuel Osborne-Paradis (born 1984), World Cup alpine ski racer from Canada
- Marie-Léonie Paradis (1840–1912), Canadian religious sister, canonized in 2024
- Maria Theresia von Paradis (1759–1824), Austrian performer and composer
- Marie Paradis (1778–1839), Frenchwoman, first woman to climb Mont Blanc
- Matt Paradis (born 1991), American football center
- Pascal Paradis, politician and lawyer from Quebec
- Pascale Paradis (born 1966), former professional tennis player from France
- Patrick Paradis, politician from Augusta, Maine in the United States
- Philippe Paradis (born 1991), Canadian ice hockey player
- Philippe-Jacques Paradis (1868–1933), manufacturer and political figure in Quebec
- Pierre Paradis (born 1950), Quebec politician and former cabinet minister
- Roland Paradis (1696–1754), silversmith in Canada
- Suzanne Paradis (born 1936), Canadian poet, novelist and critic based in Quebec
- Vanessa Paradis (born 1972), French singer and actress

== See also ==
- Paradis (disambiguation)
