= Vincenzo Pipino =

Italian thief

Vincenzo Pipino (born 22 July 1943), also known as Encio, is an Italian thief from Venice whose exploits earned him the nickname "the gentleman thief". He is the first person to successfully steal from the Doge's Palace, and has been responsible for some of the most sensational art thefts in the city.

During his lifetime, he has committed over 3,000 thefts at museums, galleries, banks, and private residences, 50 thefts of jewelry shops, and stole thousands of kilograms of gold throughout Europe. His activities have resulted in over 300 complaints to police, he has been arrested numerous times, and has received 15 sentences totaling over 25 years in prison. He once escaped from a penitentiary in Vaud, Switzerland.

He has stated that he knows he is destined to die incarcerated.

== Early life ==
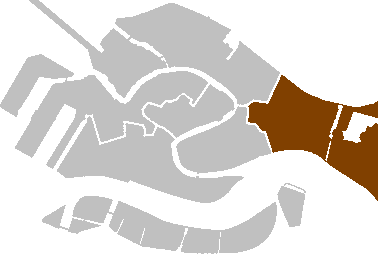
Pipino was raised in the sestiere of Castello in Venice

Born on 22 July 1943 and raised in the Venetian sestiere of Castello, Pipino is the eldest of five siblings. His mother is named Cesira, and his father Antonio was from the town of San Nicandro Garganico of Apulia. His father was a ferry captain, whose income after World War II was at times insufficient to support the family. At school as a six-year-old, he sat at the back of the class because the teacher reserved the front seats for children of the siori. Famished one day, he punched another child during an altercation, and he was subsequently placed in observation in a psychiatric ward of a medical institution. His mother, opposed to such treatment of her child, removed him from the institution and found work for him in a mortuary near Santa Maria Formosa, where he dusted coffins and dressed the corpses.

Pipino began stealing when eight years old, by which time he was working as an errand boy at a bakery and would occasionally purloin a pastry when hungry. His first theft was a 50-litre aluminum milk churn which he had to roll along the alleys; it was crushed and sold to a junk dealer. In a 2010 interview, he said that he stole a 30-kilogram bag of sugar from the Italian Navy while making a delivery of bread to the Venetian Arsenal. By the age of ten, he would sometimes steal croissants off tables at cafés in Piazza San Marco. Inquisitive by nature, he would explore the city on his own, and at other times lead his siblings through its many alleys.

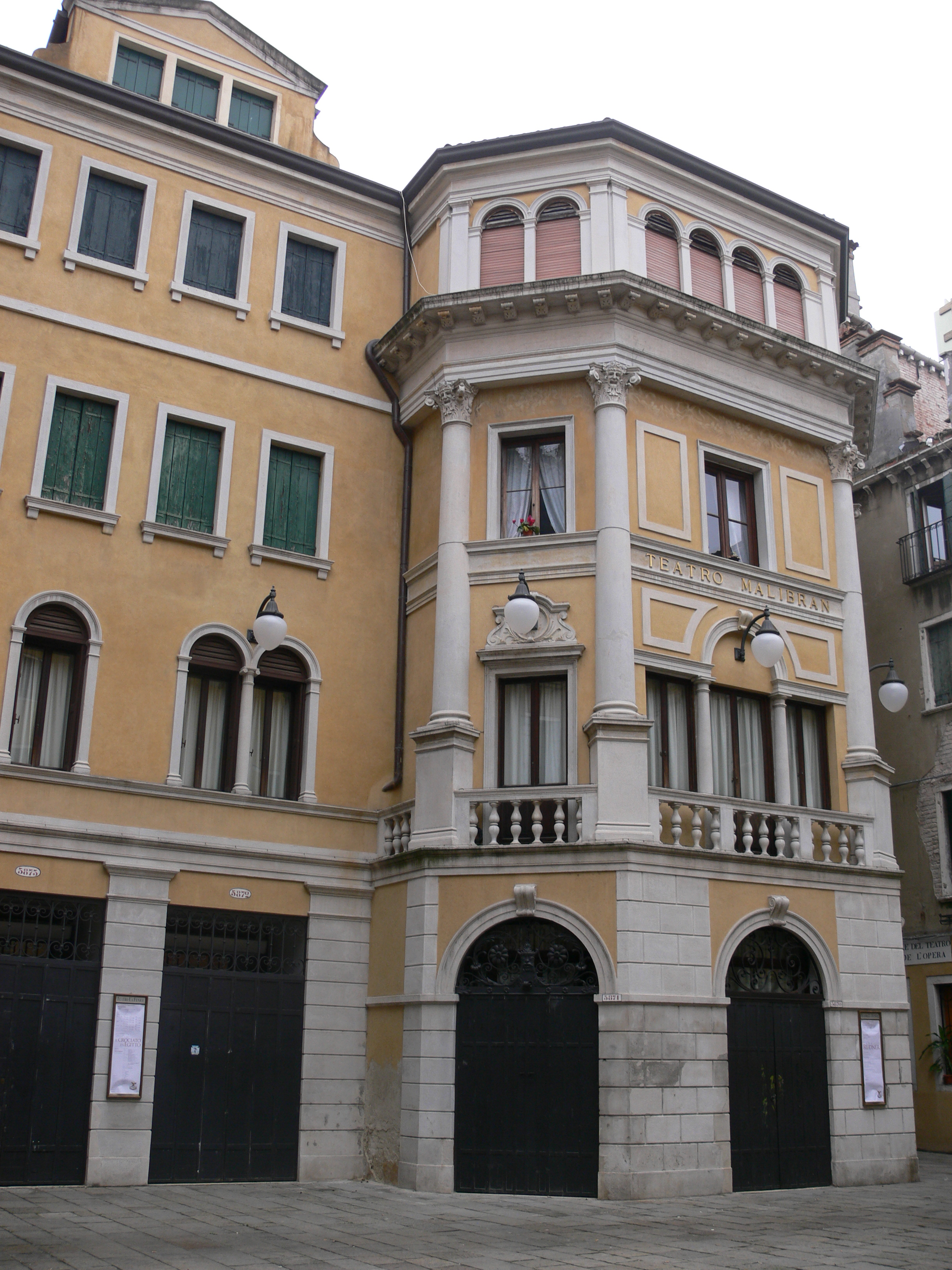
Pipino would climb the facade of the Teatro Malibran and enter through a window to watch films for which he could not afford a ticket

When he was thirteen, his mother, worried about his continued habit of thievery, invented a story about "La Gamba d'Oro" ("The Golden Leg"). It was about the ghost of a woman who had fallen in their apartment building's stairwell and died after impaling herself on a nail. She said the woman's ghost haunted the stairwell and the leg that caused her fall would glow, haunting children who did not arrive home in time. As a result, Pipino developed a fear of the dark, and he learned to scale the facade of the apartment building to avoid the stairwell. Because of his newfound fear of darkness, he resolved to improve his skills so he could operate during the day.

His first major theft was at the beaches of the Grand Hotel des Bains at the Lido di Venezia when he was fourteen. He followed a rich American tourist who, in a moment of distraction in a beach hut, was unaware that Pipino had stolen money from his shirt pocket. To Pipino's misfortune, the large sum of money required a signature to exchange at the bank, and he was later arrested and served seven months in jail.

By the age of fifteen, he had become an adept climber. He would sometimes climb to a window of the Teatro Malibran, let himself into the theatre, and set up a makeshift ticket booth at the theatre's back door, selling tickets cheaply to children who couldn't afford the theatre's prices.

In 1968, he married a woman named Carla who worked as a glassmaker in Murano, and later as a maid. They have never had children.

== Art and jewelry theft ==
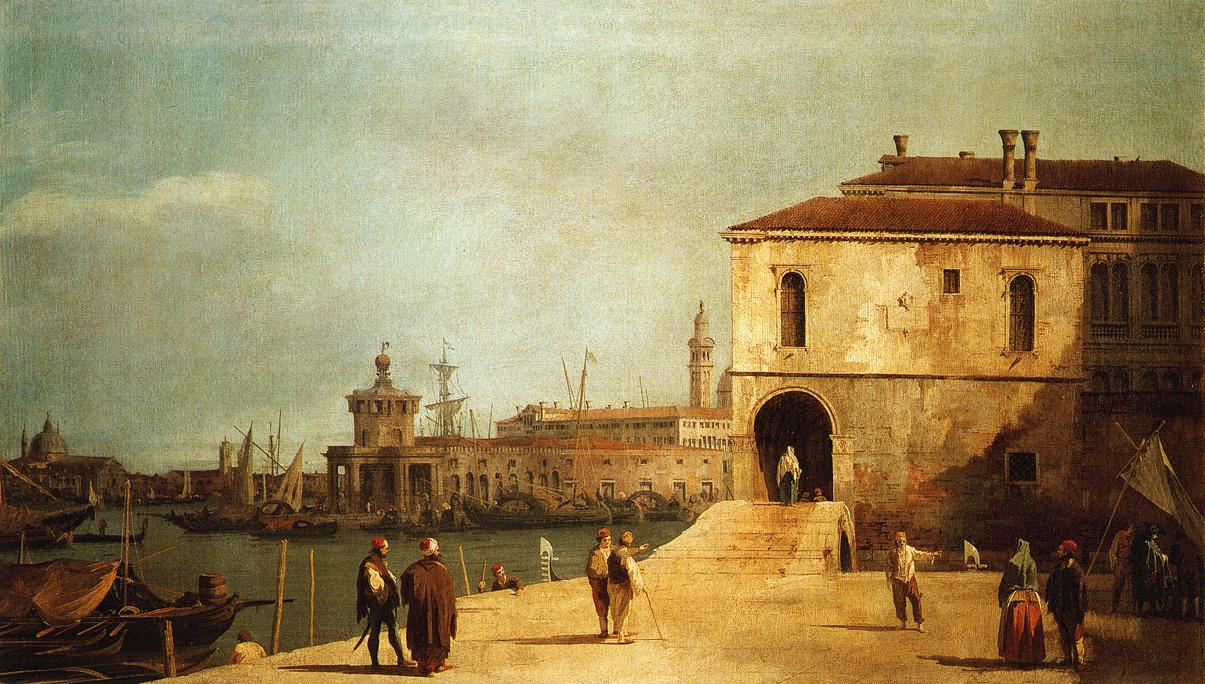
Pipino stole the 1730s Canaletto oil on canvas painting Il fonteghetto della farina from the Giustiniani palace

According to journalist and author Stefano Lorenzetto in his 2013 book Hic sunt leones, Pipino has committed over 3,000 robberies at museums, galleries, banks, and private residences in his lifetime, many of which were of palaces along the Grand Canal or around Piazza San Marco. He also committed 50 thefts of jewelry shops, and stole about 3,000 kilograms of gold throughout Europe. He never stole watches or other items being repaired, as he did not want to affect the income and livelihood of those from whom he stole. He had a personal code of conduct by which he would not use violence or blackmail. He was a careful and considerate thief, ensuring not to damage the items he stole, and to not leave a mess for his victims; for example, he would empty sugar bowls onto a kitchen towel instead of simply dumping its contents.

Art theft was his specialty, and he ensured that none of the works left Venice and that they would be returned to their owner for a ransom or other considerations. He would also steal objects of personal value to the family, such as heirlooms, which would also be ransomed to the owners, and clothing he found appealing, particularly cashmere. Because of his fear of the dark, most of his thefts were committed during the day, to the discomfort of his accomplices.

Pipino had a relationship with the Venetian police as a result of his heists, including with the chief of the special investigation unit Antonio Palmosi, who would often request to meet Pipino for coffee after a notable theft. Pipino offered to recover important items as a civic duty, accepting tokens of appreciation offered by the victims via negotiation with Palmosi and the police. He has said that there is reciprocal respect between him and the police, but that there are no favours if he is caught.

In 1992, he was commissioned for the equivalent of 200 million Italian lire to steal all Giovanni Bellini paintings from the Museo Correr. During the heist, he asked his accomplice who had contracted them, and was told "Arkan", a pseudonym he recognized as that of Željko Ražnatović. Certain that Ražnatović would not return the artworks to the museum, he told the accomplice he had to make an urgent phone call, and called the police.

He stole the 1730 Canaletto painting Il fonteghetto della farina from the Giustiniani palace in 1998. It was property of the Falck family, descendants of the founders of the Lombardy company Falck Industries. He infamously stole from the Peggy Guggenheim Collection twice in 1971.

=== Doge's Palace ===
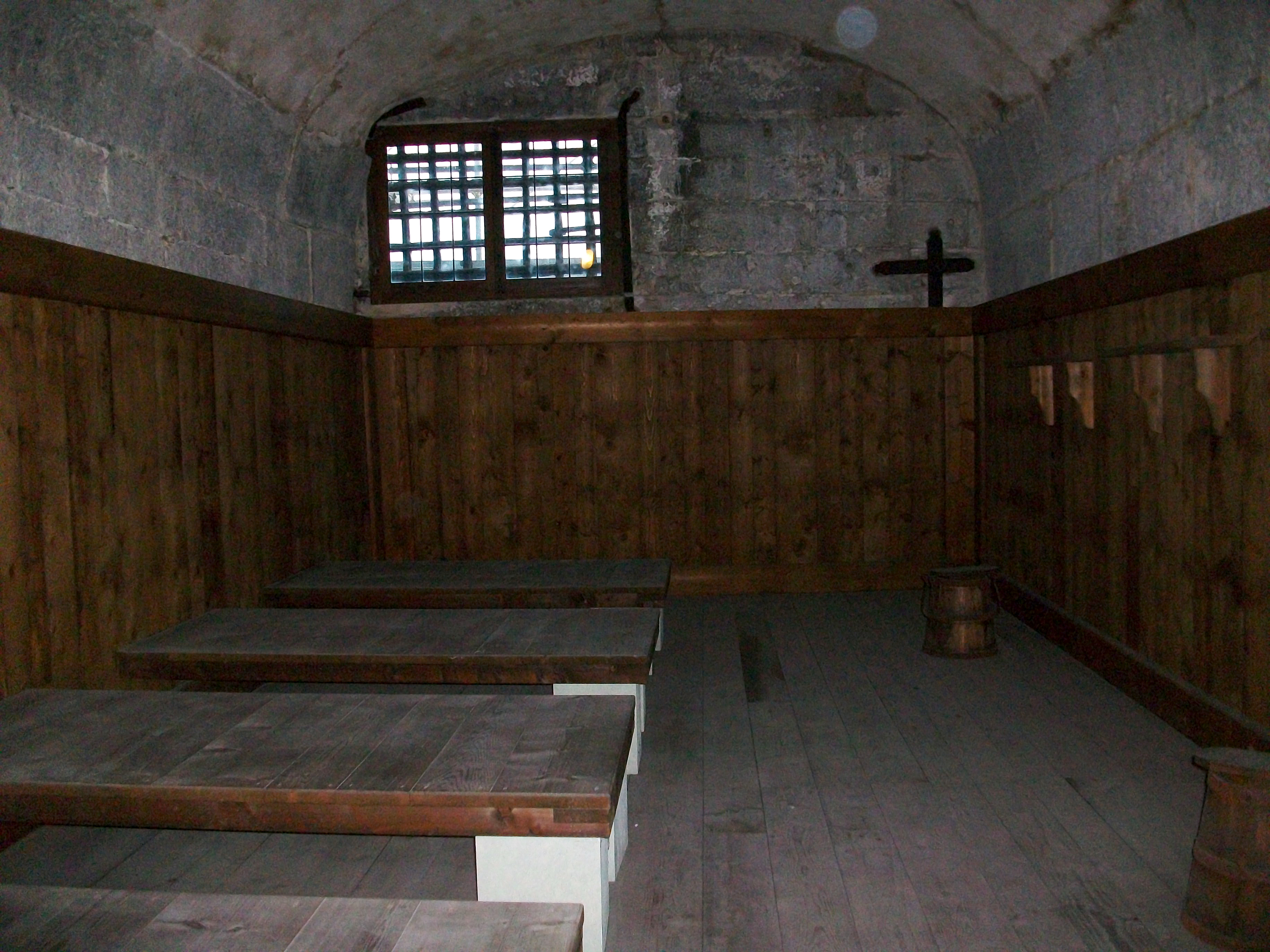
One of the cells in the New Prisons connected to the Doge's Palace, where Pipino waited until night to steal the painting Madonna col bambino

He is the first person to successfully steal from the Doge's Palace, once the residence of the Doge of Venice and since 1923 a museum operated by Fondazione Musei Civici di Venezia.

One day in 1991 while reading manuscripts at the Biblioteca Marciana to learn about art commissioned by Venetian aristocracy in the past, and to identify potential targets for theft, he encountered Andrea Zammattio, a member of the Mala del Brenta, who told Pipino "the president" had sent him to request a favour of him. The violent organized crime group was headed by Felice Maniero, known by the moniker Faccia d'angelo ("Angel face"). Maniero, under constant police surveillance and seeking leverage against them, wanted to steal fine art from Ca' Rezzonico to ransom in exchange for reduced surveillance and the release of his cousin from prison. Pipino's role was to identify target paintings and to organize the heist.

Worried that Venetian museums and galleries would respond to such a heist with increased security, making future thefts more difficult for him, two days later he proposed an alternate plan to one of Maniero's henchman in which Pipino would steal an artwork alone. When asked which piece he would steal, he replied "Just read the newspapers", and convinced the henchman by stating that "the news will be heard worldwide".

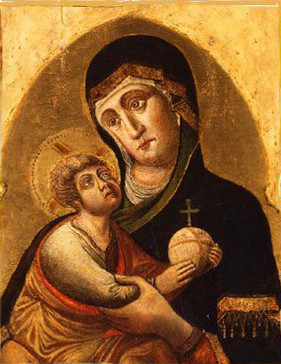
Madonna col bambino, the painting Pipino stole on 9 October 1991 from the Doge's Palace

On 9 October, Pipino entered the Doge's Palace and joined a tour group. As they passed over the Bridge of Sighs into the dark halls of the "New Prisons", Pipino intentionally lagged behind the group, and entered undetected into one of the cells and closed its door, where he waited until night. He timed the rounds of the night guards, who passed by the cell in 45-minute intervals, and soon after the guard passed his cell at 2:00 in the morning he left his cell and returned to the palace via the bridge, entering the "Sala di Censori". In that room was the Madonna col bambino, a work symbolic of "the power of the Venetian state" painted in the early 1500s by a member of the Vivarini. Pipino took the painting, covered it with a blanket, and left the palace by a side door. The lead story in the local newspaper was Colpo a Palazzo Ducale: Un furto facile, facile ("Shock at Doge's Palace: An easy, easy theft"). By this time, the painting was already in the possession of the Mala del Brenta, who also stole the jaw bone of Anthony of Padua from the Basilica of Saint Anthony of Padua.

When summoned by Palmosi, he was threatened with special surveillance, which would prevent Pipino from associating with anyone having a criminal record, including most of his friends and accomplices. Pipino told Palmosi the painting would be returned within 20 days. There are inconsistent stories about subsequent events, but the painting was recovered and the police held a press conference on 7 November announcing that an anonymous tip led to its recovery. Maniero negotiated the return of St. Anthony's jaw bone to the basilica in exchange for the release of his cousin.

== Informant ==
In an interview with Maurizio Dianese, a reporter for Il Gazzettino, Pipino recounted events during an incarceration in the mid-1990s. He said that police chief Arnaldo La Barbera of the Palermo, Sicily police met Pipino in Rome in October 1992, where Pipino was incarcerated and being investigated for drug trafficking. La Barbera had Pipino placed in a cell with Vincenzo Scarantino for about one week to be an informant for the police, in exchange for a payment between 100 and 200 million lire (approximately US$80,000 to $160,000) and having Rome police overlook the drug charges against him. He was also promised a transfer to Carcere di Santa Maria Maggiore in Santa Croce, Venice, which was executed after his services were rendered.

La Barbera instructed Pipino to avoid discussions with Scarantino in their cell or in the hallways, a pretense to avoid covert listening devices; their discussions always occurred in the communal prison showers. In testimony at a trial in 2013, Pipino stated that there were listening devices in the prison cell which he disabled after several days in order to demonstrate he did not wish to be involved in the process. Pipino stated that Scarantino denied he was involved with the Massacre of Via D'Amelio, a targeted bombing in Palermo on 19 July 1992 that killed anti-mafia magistrate Paolo Borsellino and five members of his police escort. According to Pipino, he "fiercely denied" robbing the car used in the bombing. Scarantino told Pipino that he was investigated for involvement in the bombing only because he was brother-in-law of Salvatore Profeta, who had participated in the preparation of the car bomb. Scarantino became a pentito and sentenced to 18 years in prison for the massacre, and according to Pipino Scarantino's recanting of involvement had been concealed by La Barbera, who had told Pipino not to disclose information he learned in discussions with Scarantino to anyone other than La Barbera. Pipino states that La Barbera thus created the "falso pentito". Scarantino retracted his admission of guilt in 1995.

== Credit card fraud ==
In August 2008, he was caught with two other people with two cloned credit cards. Two years later he was sentenced to one year and three months in jail. Pipino was arrested on the steps of the Venezia Santa Lucia railway station on 23 June 2011 while delivering a package containing eight cloned credit cards to Mauro Zanetti. On 7 May 2012, he was sentenced to three years in prison.

In 2013, Pipino was charged with credit card fraud by the public prosecutor of Gorizia, a town at the foot of the Julian Alps in Friuli-Venezia Giulia bordering Slovenia. He was accused of being the leader of a group that stole credit cards from tourists in the Italian regions of Friuli-Venezia Giulia and Veneto, particularly those from the United States. Tourist credit cards were skimmed at Venetian restaurants, and these stolen credit card numbers were used to create cards with fake identities, which were used to buy luxury goods.

According to the Gorizia police department, from mid 2012 to February 2013 the group spent at least one million Euros using stolen credit cards. Pipino used the cloned credit cards in games rooms and casinos, purchasing casino tokens, using a few on electronic gaming machines, then cashing out the remaining tokens.

The group was put under investigation when a merchant complained of two individuals trying to use a fraudulent credit card to make a large purchase. They were found to be associated with a group that acquired magnetic stripe codes involving over 100 individuals, organized by a smaller group of 20, and led by a group of five including Pipino. One of the members was his brother. The group made purchases in Slovenia and Italy, including designer clothing, perfumes, high-end appliances, mobile phones, laptop and personal computers, watches, gifts, and meals. Pipino spent over €60 thousand on scratch-and-win cards over two months. Police issued 27 search warrants in Venice, Gorizia, Treviso, and Pordenone, during which they seized fraudulent credit cards, card skimmers, and documents relating to the crimes. He was arrested on 27 March 2013, and released on 31 March with the requirement that he stay in Venice and register with the police daily. During a pretrial hearing, he asked to leave Venice for Rome, ostensibly to meet with producers who wanted to adapt his book into a film.

== Drug trafficking ==
Pipino was arrested at a boarding house near the Roma Termini railway station in Rome in 1992 on suspicion of organizing trafficking of heroin between Rome and Venice. He served eight years and three months for possession of 3 1/2 grams of drugs, which he denied having and to which he referred as an injustice. In a 1997 interview while nearing the end of his sentence, he stated "I am a good thief, not a drug dealer or trafficker."

In 2004, an increased incidence of drug overdoses and violence by drug addicts on the Venetian island of Sacca Fisola led to the arrest of Pipino, who was suspected of organizing the drug trade between Rome and Venice.

In the 2010s Pipino and other individuals, most of them over 60 years old, were put under surveillance for suspicion of involvement in drug trafficking. Referred to as "Vecchia Guardia" ("Old Guard"), the operation intercepted telephone calls from booths and caught several drug runners in the Venetian Lagoon returning from Rome with a shipment of drugs.

By March 2013, the Venetian Court of Appeal (Corte di Appello) sentenced him to 11 years in prison for drug trafficking. In November 2013, the Court of Cassation upheld the ruling by the Court of Appeal, denying Pipino's appeal of the sentence.

Pipino has repeatedly stated he has had no dealings with cocaine or heroin trafficking.

== Legacy ==
His activities have resulted in over 300 complaints to police and 15 sentences totalling over 25 years in prison. He has been arrested numerous times, three times for flagrant criminal acts, twice in Lausanne and once in Düsseldorf, and has served time in prison in France, Germany, and Switzerland. He once escaped from Maison de sécurité élevée de la Plaine de l’Orbe, a penitentiary in Vaud, Switzerland. While serving his prison sentences, he was variously incarcerated with Francis Turatello, Michele Zaza, Valentino Gionta, the Graviano brothers (Giuseppe Graviano and Filippo Graviano), Alberto Franceschini, as well as Vincenzo Scarantino. He also learned of others who had been incarcerated, but not simultaneously with his own incarceration, with whom he would later associate, including Enrico De Pedis and Antonio Spavone.

He also served time with Antonio Negri ("Toni") in Rebibbia in 1997 and 1998, who encouraged him to write and with whom he has remained friends. He taught himself law, and offered legal advice to detainees. By March 2006, out of prison for a year, he was receiving about 30 letters per day from inmates seeking help from the "sindacalista dei detenuti" ("trade unionist of detainees") and had by then been involved for many years for the rights of prisoners. He views incarceration as social discrimination, and promotes rehabilitation to ensure that prisoners do not lose hope of one day reintegrating into society.

He established a Facebook account that he uses to reveal tricks of the trade, and to dissuade young people from adopting a lifestyle similar to his, stating that when near the end of life, "you will realize that you will lovingly squeeze between your hands an intimate nothingness" ("vi accorgerete di stringere fra le mani un affettuoso e intimo nulla"). In a 2010 interview with Il Giornale, he said he was providing consulting services to the wealthy, teaching them how to protect their properties, for a fee of up to €2000. He says all home security alarm systems have flaws, none will deter professional thieves, and that all passive infrared sensors and anti-intrusion devices can be circumvented.

The newspaper Pordenone Oggi has likened him to fictional gentleman thief Arsène Lupin. When asked in an interview how he reconciled his activities with the seventh commandment ("thou shalt not steal", per tradition of the Catechism of the Catholic Church), he stated that he always respected the commandment, and that he had only emptied the pockets of those who had stolen before him.

He resided in Giudecca before his arrest for credit card fraud in 2013. In a 2010 interview, he stated that he is "destined to die incarcerated" ("sono destinato a morire in carcere").

== Works ==
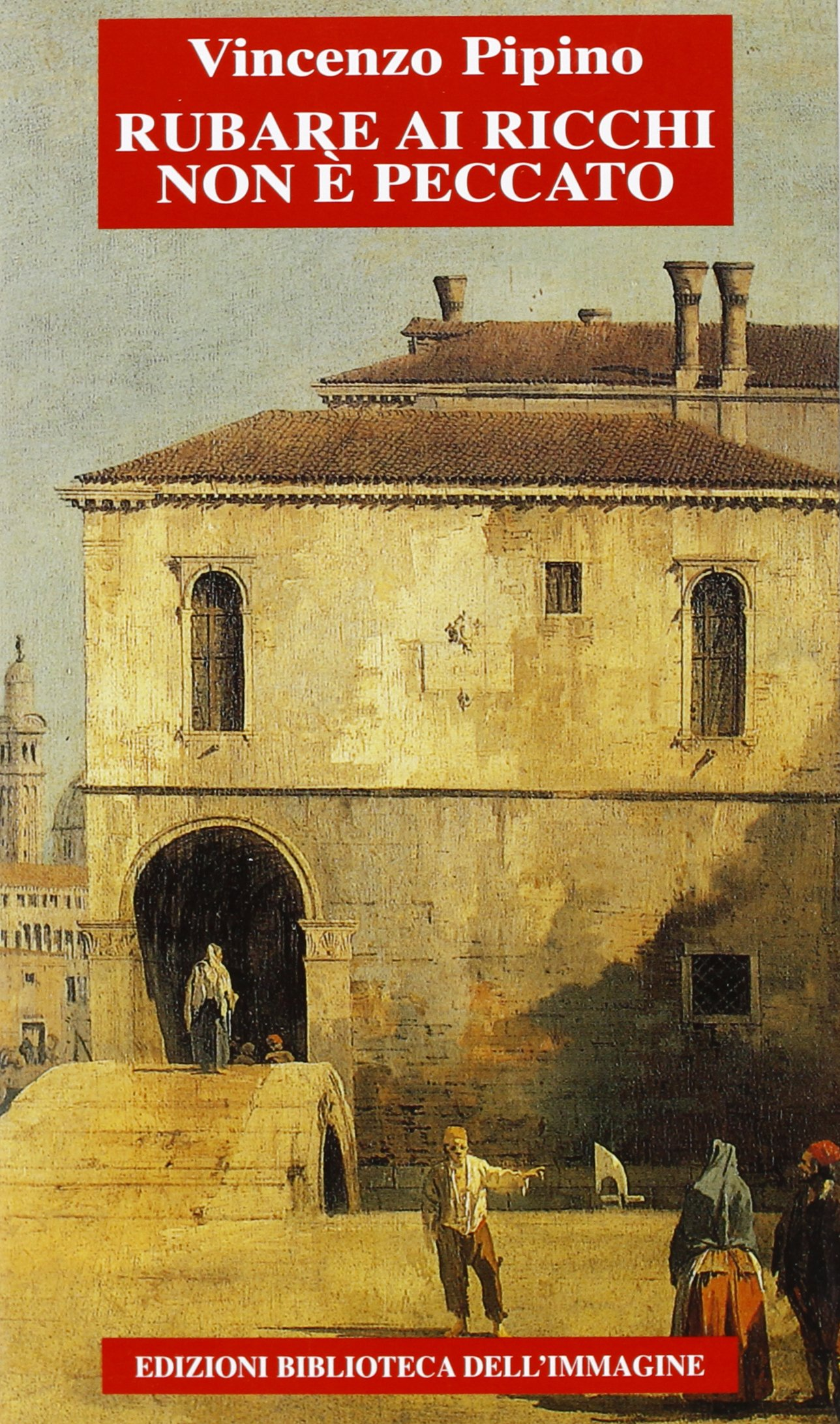
The cover of Pipino's autobiography Rubare ai ricchi non è peccato, depicting the 1730 Canaletto work Fonteghetto della farina

Pipino is the author of two books. In 2010, his autobiography Rubare ai ricchi non è peccato ("Stealing from the rich is not a sin") was published by Biblioteca dell'Immagine. Its cover depicts a portion of Canaletto's Fonteghetto della farina that he stole in 1998. In October 2015, Memorie di un ladro filosofo. Quando il furto diventa un'arte was published by Milieu edizioni, Milano, in Banditi senza tempo, and features a portrait of Pipino photographed by Beatrice Mancini.

- Pipino, Vincenzo (2010). Rubare ai ricchi non è peccato [Stealing from the rich is not a sin] (in Italian). Biblioteca dell'Immagine. ISBN 9788863910292.
- Pipino, Vincenzo (September 2015). Memorie di un ladro filosofo. Quando il furto diventa un'arte [Memories of a philosopher thief: When the theft becomes an art] (in Italian). Milieu (Banditi senza tempo). ISBN 978-88-98600-10-6.
