= Paradis (Kristiansand) =

- Neighborhood in Kristiansand
- Interactive map of Paradis
- Coordinates: 58.1529°N 07.9609°E
- Country: Norway
- County: Agder
- Municipality: Kristiansand
- Borough: Grim
- District: Grim
- Elevation: 23 m (75 ft)
- Time zone: UTC+01:00 (CET)
  - Summer (DST): UTC+02:00 (CEST)
- Postal code: 4616
- Area code: 38

Paradis is a neighbourhood in the city of Kristiansand in Agder county, Norway. It is located in the borough of Grim and in the district of Grim. Paradis is northwest of Grimsmyra, north of Klappane, west of Enrum.

== Transport ==
Bus lines through Paradis
Line	Destination
13	Grimsmyra - Lund
