= Paradiso (immersive theater experience) =

Theatrical experience in New York City

Paradiso is an immersive theater experience and interactive game that was created by Michael Counts. The first chapter opened in New York City in July 2016 with potential for another four chapters. Counts drew inspiration from Paradiso from Dante's Divine Comedy and the experience features elements of crime noir.

== Paradiso: Chapter 1 ==
The first chapter's premise places ten participants in a locked apartment that they must escape while also evading the Virgil Corporation, a shadowy crime gang. Players must solve puzzles within a certain span of time, otherwise they will not be able to complete the entire experience. Special effects such as 3D technology and actors are used during the experience to enhance game play.

== Reception ==
Paradiso: Chapter 1 received praise from media outlets such as Fangoria and the New York Daily News, the former of which felt that it was an "intense and reinvigorating escape room experience" and compared it favorably to similar immersive theater experiences by Counts. The New Yorker was mostly positive in their review, noting that while the puzzles and plot "feel desultory" the show worked as a haunted house experience. The New York Times commented that "What you get out of it will depend on what you put into it, and perhaps on whom you bring along", further remarking that knowing the strengths fellow participants ahead of time would potentially make it faster to solve puzzles, as time was limited.

The Village Voice was more critical, as they felt that the plot was too thin, a criticism shared by Exeunt Magazine.
