= Paradies =

The term Paradies (German for paradise) may refer to

- Paradise (2011 film), a 2011 Greek romance film directed by Panagiotis Fafoutis
- Paradise trilogy, a film trilogy by Ulrich Seidl with the original title Paradies
- Paradies (album), an album by Silly
- Paradies (Constance), a district of Constance
- "Paradies" (song), a song by Die Toten Hosen
- Paradies, a film by Želimir Žilnik
- Paradies Castle, a castle in the Ústí nad Labem Region
- Paradies Glacier (German: Paradiesgletscher), a glacier situated in the Lepontine Alps in Switzerland
- Paradies Lagardère or The Paradies Shops, a chain of airport specialty stores
- Paradies Monastery (Switzerland), a former Poor Clares monastery in Schlatt, canton of Thurgau, Switzerland
- Paradies Monastery or Paradyż Abbey, a former Cistercian abbey in Gościkowo, Poland

== People with the surname ==
- Ewa Paradies (1920–1946), Nazi concentration camp overseer executed for war crimes
- Pietro Domenico Paradies, Italian Baroque composer and keyboardist
- Yin Paradies, Australian public health researcher
