= Paradis, Iran =

Paradis پاراديس
- Village
- Location within Iran
- Coordinates: 30°19′58″N 50°17′32″E
- Country: Iran
- Province: Khuzestan
- County: Behbahan
- Bakhsh: Zeydun
- Rural District: Sardasht

Population (2006)
  - Total: 45
- Time zone: UTC+3:30 (IRST)
  - Summer (DST): UTC+4:30 (IRDT)

Paradis (Persian: پاراديس, also Romanized as Pārādīs) is a village in Sardasht Rural District, Zeydun District, Behbahan County, Khuzestan Province, Iran. At the 2006 census, its population was 45, in 10 families.
