= Enrum (Kristiansand) =

- Neighborhood in Kristiansand
- Interactive map of Enrum
- Coordinates: 58.1533°N 07.9718°E
- Country: Norway
- County: Agder
- Municipality: Kristiansand
- Borough: Grim
- District: Grim
- Elevation: 23 m (75 ft)
- Time zone: UTC+01:00 (CET)
  - Summer (DST): UTC+02:00 (CEST)
- Postal code: 4616
- Area code: 38

Enrum is a neighbourhood in the city of Kristiansand in Agder county, Norway. It is located in the borough of Grim and in the district of Grim. It is located north of Grimsmyra, east of Klappane and Paradis, and southwest of Ravnedalen.

Roads through Enrum
Line	Destination
Artillerivollenveien	Grimsmyra - Ravnedalen

Buses through Enrum
Line	Destination
13	Grimsmyra - Lund
