= Il Paradiso =

Fresco by Tintoretto, in Doge's Palace

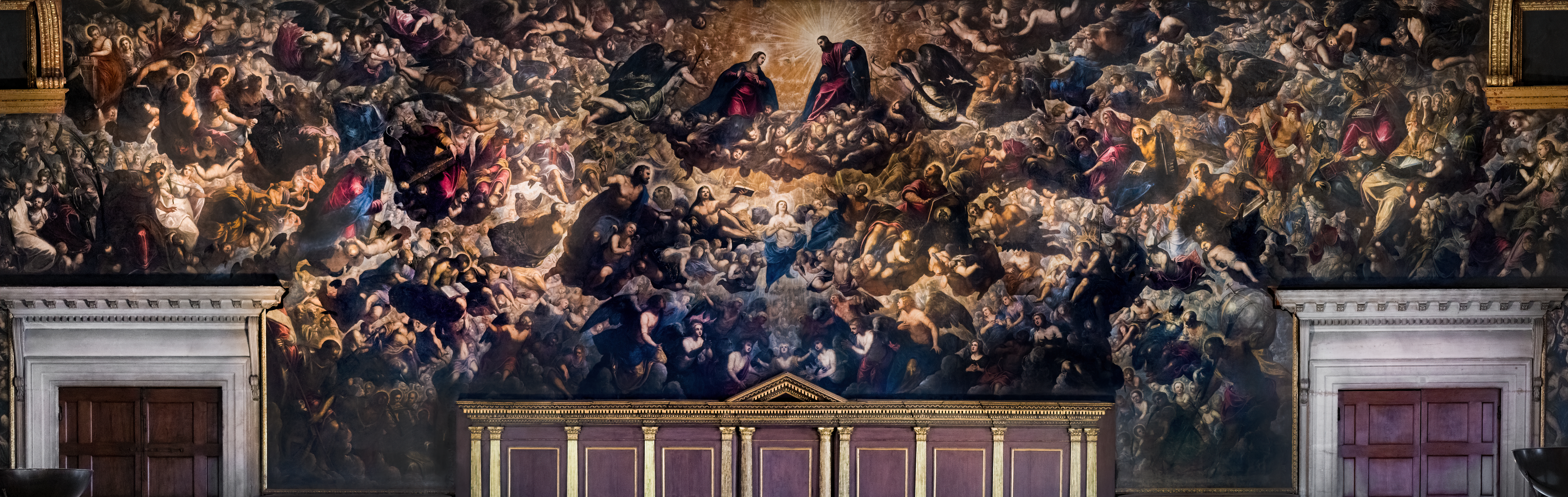
Gloria del Paradiso (1588-1592) by Tintoretto

Il Paradiso is a massive (22 x 9 metres) oil painting on canvas that dominates the main hall of the Doge's Palace, which hosted the Great Council of Venice. It is one of the largest paintings on canvas in the world and was painted by Jacopo Robusti, known more commonly as Tintoretto. The painting features a heavenly scene with depictions of various religious figures such as the portrayal of Justina, patron saint of Padua (whose celebration day is October 7, the date of the Battle of Lepanto).

From the centre of the stage, a path of light opens up towards the Empyrean, allowing the souls of the Just to ascend (with the assistance of angels) and God's Grace to descend upon the Doge. At the centre of this path is the radiant figure of a semi-veiled Archangel. The composition is crowded with around 500 figures, depicted in detail.

Of it, John Ruskin said, "I have no hesitation in asserting this picture to be by far the most precious work of art of any kind whatsoever, now existing in the world."

Many of Tintoretto's works were too vital to their location or too large in size to relocate to other exhibits, which is why many of them remain based in Venice, Italy.

== Painting ==
The Virgin Interceding with Christ portrays the scene surmounted by the dove of the Holy Spirit and raised upon a dense semicircular rank of cherubim and seraphim. The reference to the Annunciation that had figured in the previous fresco was present: the Archangel Gabriel is shown holding out a lily to Mary, depicted with a halo of 7 stars. The divine light emanates not from the dove of the Holy Spirit but from the figure of Christ the Judge, shown holding a globe surmounted by a cross; to his left stands the Archangel Michael holding out the scales of justice. The order of the celestial hierarchy is respected: the evangelists appear in a semi-circle immediately beneath the main scene, with the saints aligned in the same order in which they figure in church litanies.

Historical references include the portrayal of Justina, patron saint of Padua (whose celebration day is October 7, the date of the Battle of Lepanto).

From the centre of the stage, a path of light opens up towards the Empyrean, allowing the souls of the Just to ascend (with the assistance of angels) and God's Grace to descend upon the Doge. At the centre of this path is the radiant figure of a semi-veiled Archangel. The composition is crowded with around 500 figures, depicted in detail.

== Influences ==
Around two decades into the 16th century, a cloth dyer in Venice, Italy by the name of Battista Robusti conceived a son who would be known as Jacopo Robusti. Little to nothing is known about the childhood of Jacopo because his father's business as a dyer was not significant enough to be well documented. The boy was known to his peers as Tintoretto. Carlo Ridolfi, who was born around the same time frame as Tintoretto's death near the end of the 16th century, would write a biography of Tintoretto. He revealed that Tintoretto had begun to practice drawing at an extremely early point in his life. He used the products and materials that his father already possessed within his line of work in order to give his works the colour they required. The fact that Tintoretto possessed uncanny prowess and talent at such an early stage in his life is proven by how he was able to study closely under Titian, who was quite possibly the greatest of his own time within Venice and extremely well-renowned. A worthy pupil who was in command of otherworldly skill or in contact with wealthy and influential patrons could find refuge and experience from the workshop of the most well-known painter of his time. This pupil proved to be Tintoretto. Written records during this period confirm to us that teacher and student clashed regularly, while hinting at the fact that Titian may have been envious of the young boy due to his raw natural talent. It is true that brilliant minds may not be the most understanding, and an insensitive person is more prone to making enemies which may easily cause the destruction of a productive work atmosphere. A master craftsman could have quickly become impartial to a student wise or advanced beyond their years.

Elaborating with gorgeous detail, Ridolfi tells us of times when Tintoretto was at work with Titian in his workshop. Tintoretto was said to have been able to copy his instructor's art so pristinely that this was enough reason to cause Titian to cast him out of the very studio without a word more. To further support the suspicion of jealousy within Titian's workshop, it was known that Tintoretto never received praise or recognition from Titian until the master saw his work unsigned and displayed openly. Clearly, Titian must have possessed motives unbeknownst to us because he had more commissions than he could ever tend to, and having an aide such as Tintoretto would have been extremely invaluable when patrons became weary of waiting for their artwork. This motive or motives may never see the light of day due to Ridolfi never learning them, and no record of that time remains.

== History ==
In 1577, a fire destroyed part of the Doge's Palace, including a 14th-century fresco by Guariento depicting the Coronation of the Virgin. The painting was situated behind the throne on which the doge and wealthy aristocrats took seats among the Great Council during their gatherings. Various artists received detailed directions on content and composition, with the central thought being the recreation of the visual aspects of the destroyed work. The main goal was to imitate the aesthetic power of the destroyed artwork as closely as possible. A competition to replace the damaged painting was held. The contestants submitted highly varied sketches. Paolo Veronese and Francesco Bassano were chosen to complete the enormous artwork in tandem, but Veronese died before the work began and the commission was reassigned to Tintoretto. Tintoretto presented two sketches, both unlike the final version; this was his last major work and it was completed mostly by his workshop under the direction of his son, Domenico. This gigantic canvas—one of the world's largest paintings, almost 25 metres (82 ft) long—was painted in sections, in the large main hall of the Scuola della Misericordia.

The main premise of Tintoretto's Paradise was Jesus Christ, as opposed to Mary, who was secondary and depictions of the Annunciation were removed, giving more power to the image of Christ being superior to Mary. However, both figures had to be included in order to remain true to the theme of paradise that was demonstrated in Guariento's original work. Multitudinous crowds of angels as well as saints intentionally evoke the idea of a Last Judgment. This served as a reminder to council attendees to be mindful of their actions and morals as there will be consequences in the end.

It can be assumed that most painters who have graced Tintoretto's more advanced age when receiving a project on such a scale as the Doge's Palace was, would have hesitated. The massive nature of the masterpiece demanded aggressive physical labour in order to make any notable progress. Tintoretto was able to finish an example diagram of the final work but was unable to carry out the task of completing the final work in full. Echols and Ilchman explain in their book Tintoretto: Artist of Renaissance Venice, "[Tintoretto] lacked the strength to climb up and down the scaffolding and put the final touches on his canvas. So he passed that task on to [his son] Domenico."

Tintoretto himself painted several generous portions of ceiling panel just for the intricate project. His additions put emphasis on the city of Venice's unique political structure, and showcased its civil rights, military prowess and achievements. This was whilst also celebrating the city's unique form of government, touted civic freedom, and exemplifying Venice's equality within the Holy Roman Empire and the papacy as well.

== In popular culture ==
=== Literature ===
Tintoretto's Paradise is the titular subject of The Prisoner of Paradise, a 2021 thriller by Rob Samborn, published by TouchPoint Press.

== Gallery ==
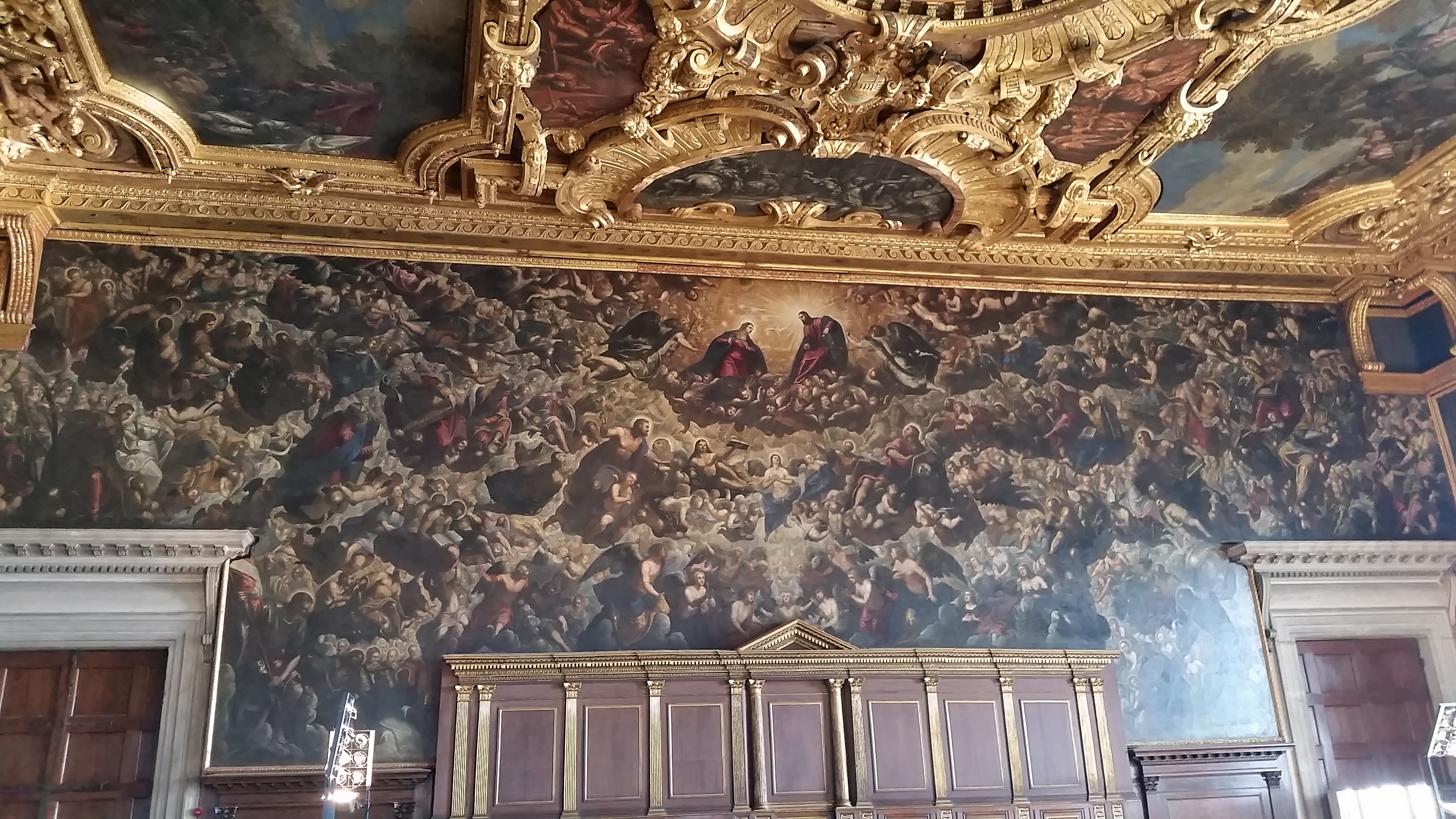

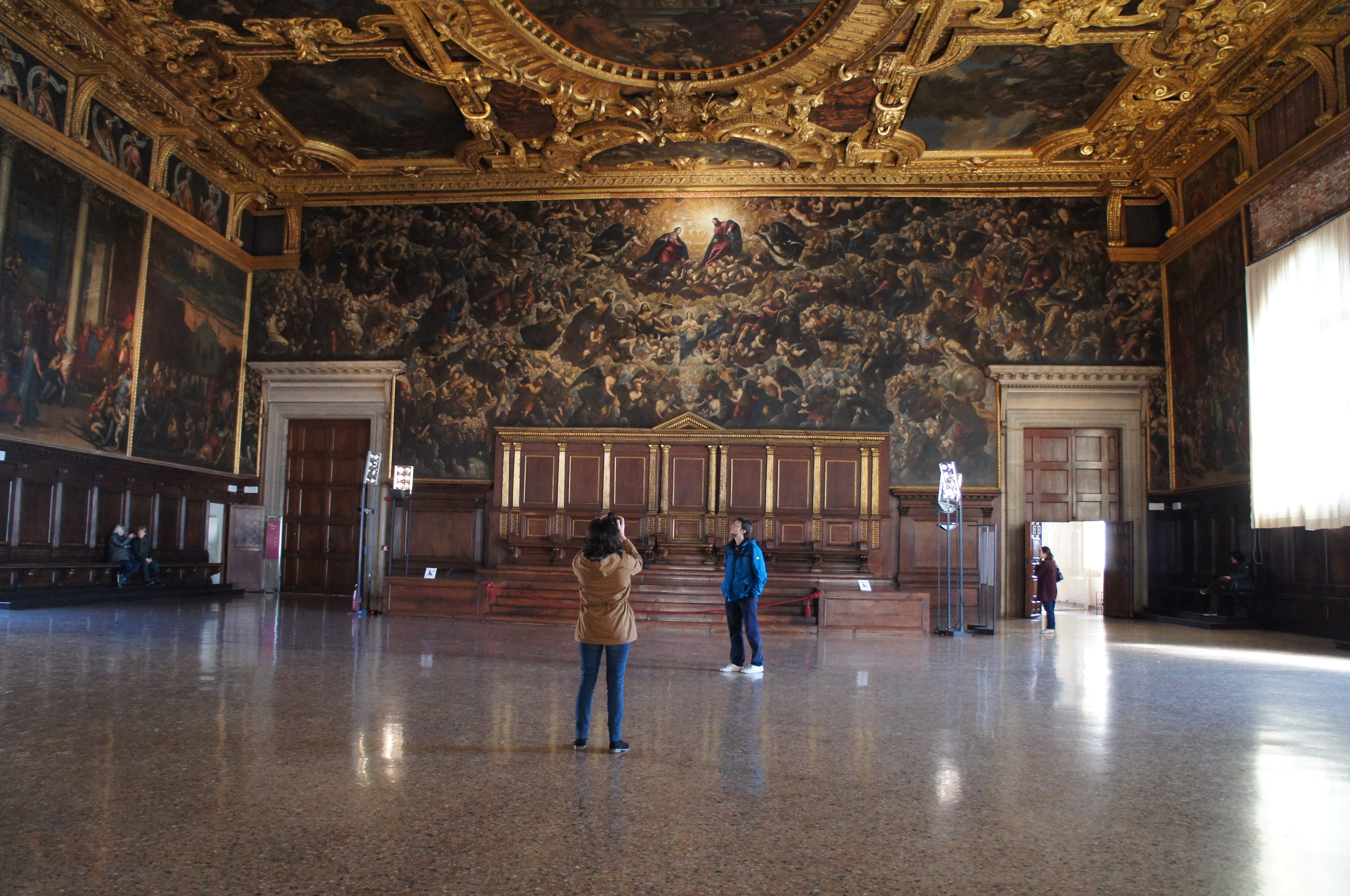

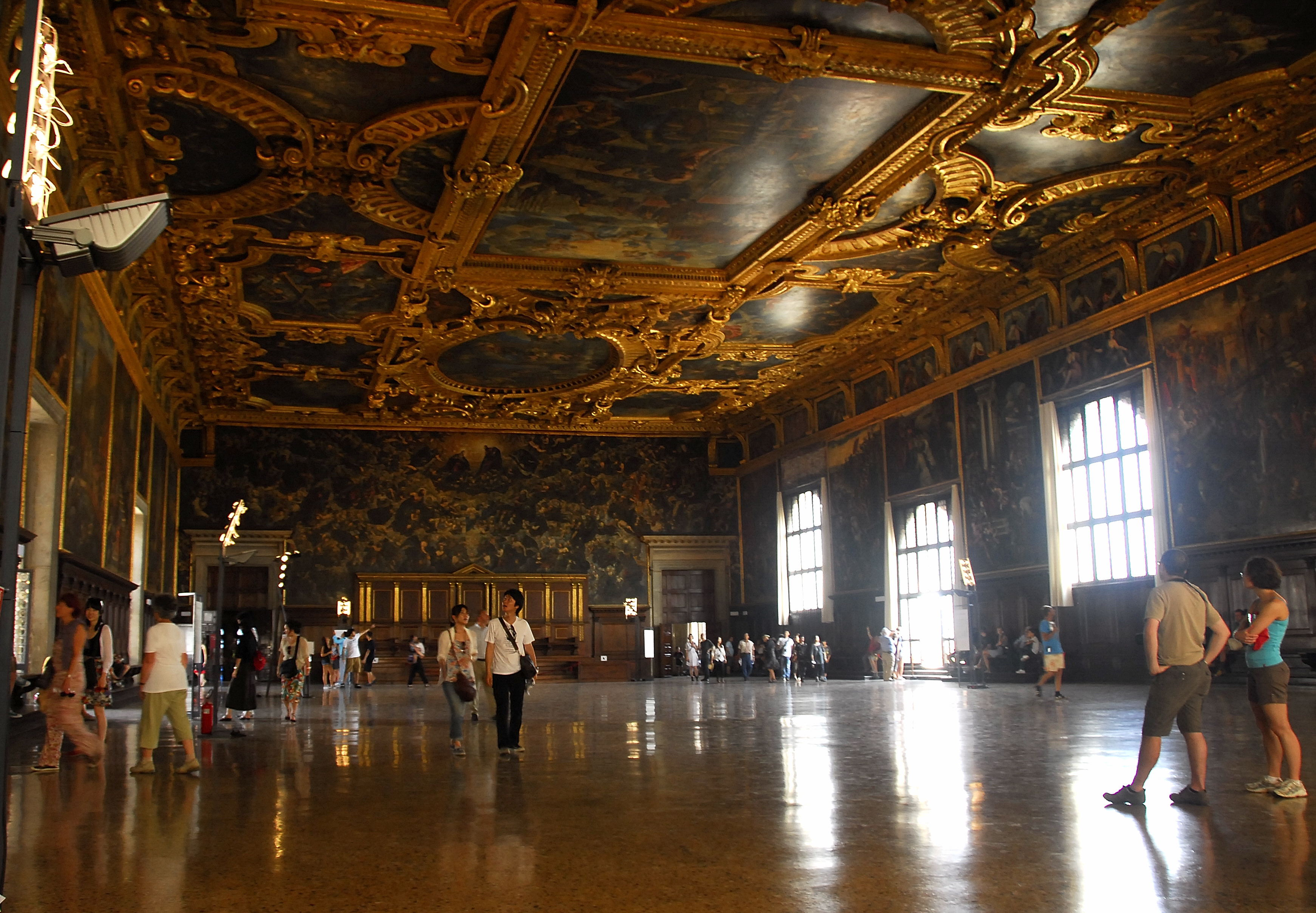

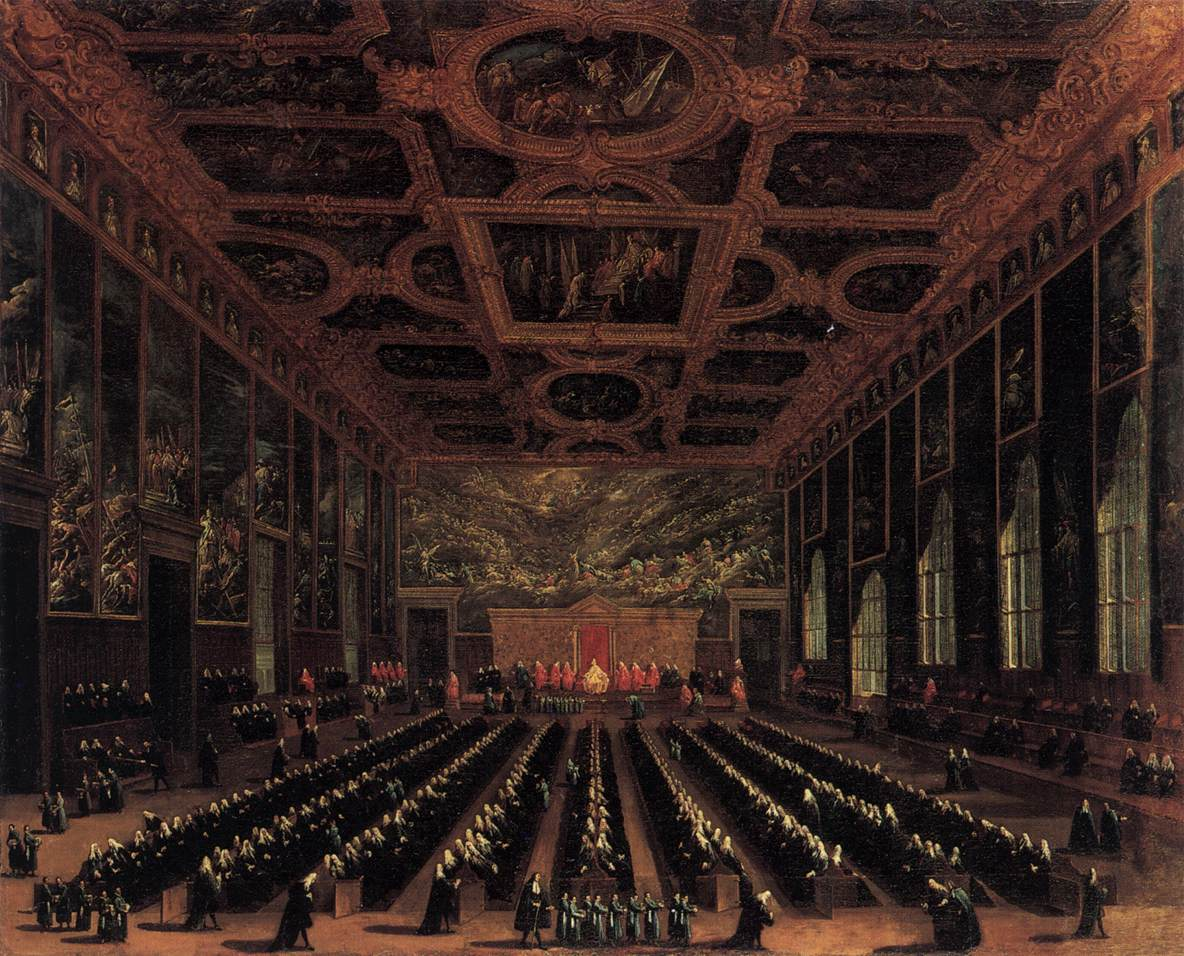
