= List of Bergen Light Rail stations =

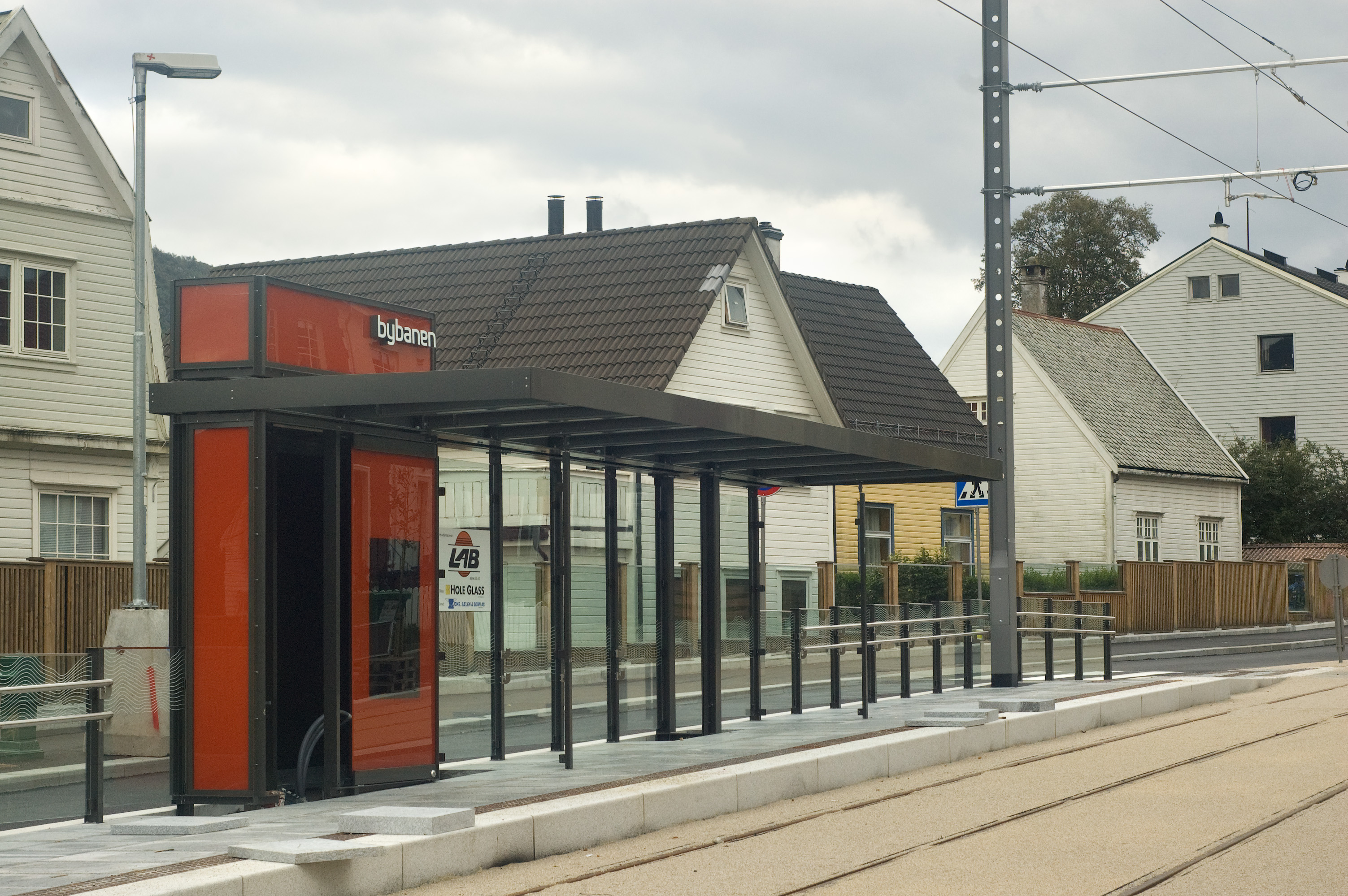
Brann stadion

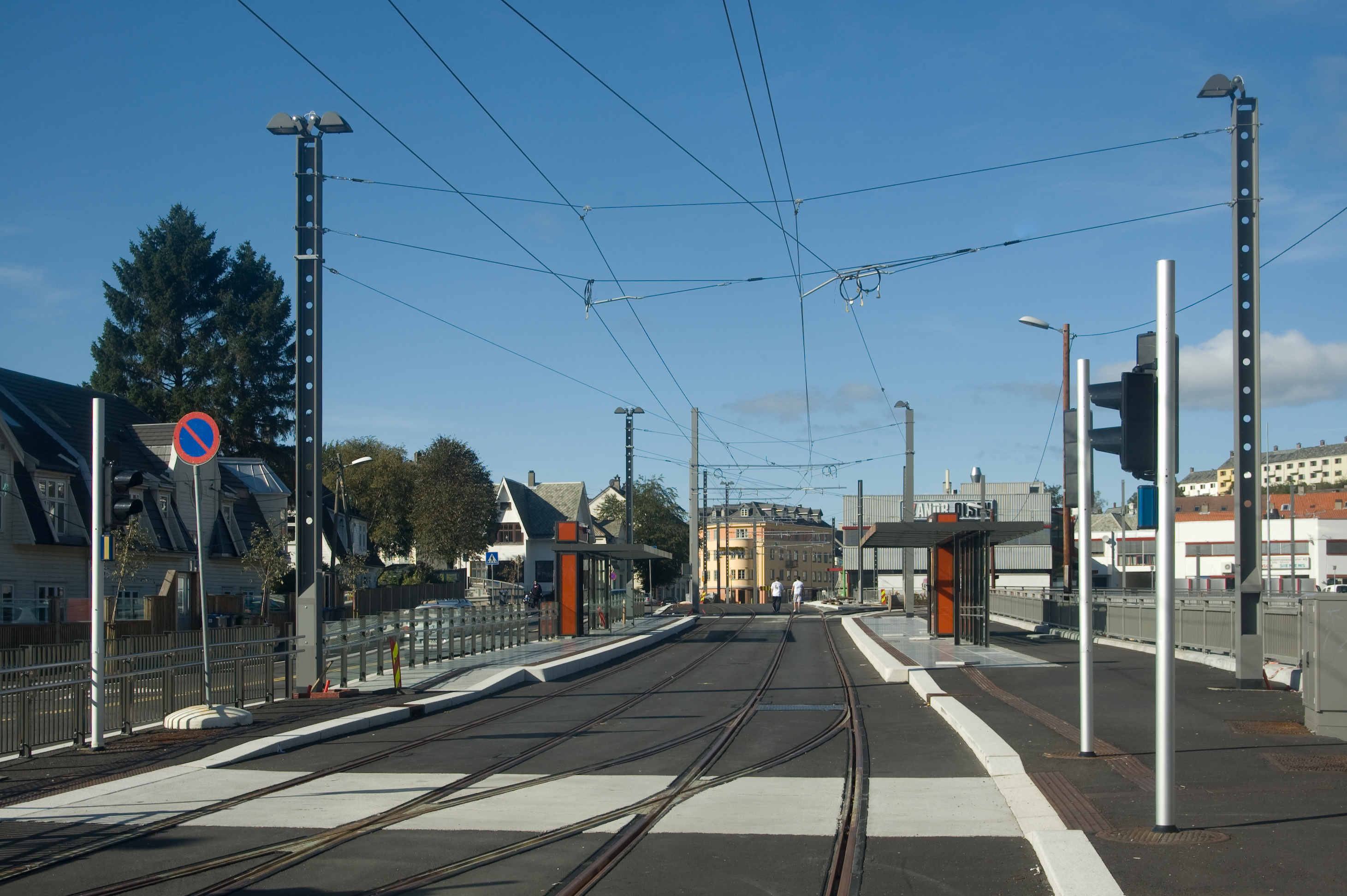
Kronstad Station

The Bergen Light Rail is a light rail system serving Bergen, Norway. Opened on 22 June 2010, the first stage consists of 15 stations along a 9.8-kilometre (6.1 mi) line. Stage two opened 21 June 2013 and expanded the system with another five stations over 3.6 kilometres to Lagunen. Stage three opened in 2016.

The stations and the visual profile of the system as a whole are designed by the Bergen-based design groups Cubus and Fuggi Baggi Design, and Copenhagen-based Kontrapunkt. The stations are built with low-level platforms, and have facilities for buying tickets and dynamic displays that show when the next tram will arrive. The platforms have step-free access to the trams, accessible by wheelchairs and perambulators. While the trams were initially 32 metres long and have five articulated sections, the stations were dimensioned for 44 metre long trains with seven articulated sections, which were placed into service at a later date.

The municipality government of Bergen has permitted denser development around the stations, where it wants most new housing in Bergen to be built. Development projects for Slettebakken, Wergeland, Paradis and Lagunen have been announced by private developers. Many of the stations are located in primarily residential areas, and the projects have met a lot of resistance from residents who fear that the character of their neighbourhoods will be radically altered.

== Stations ==
The following is a list of the Bybanen light rail stations.

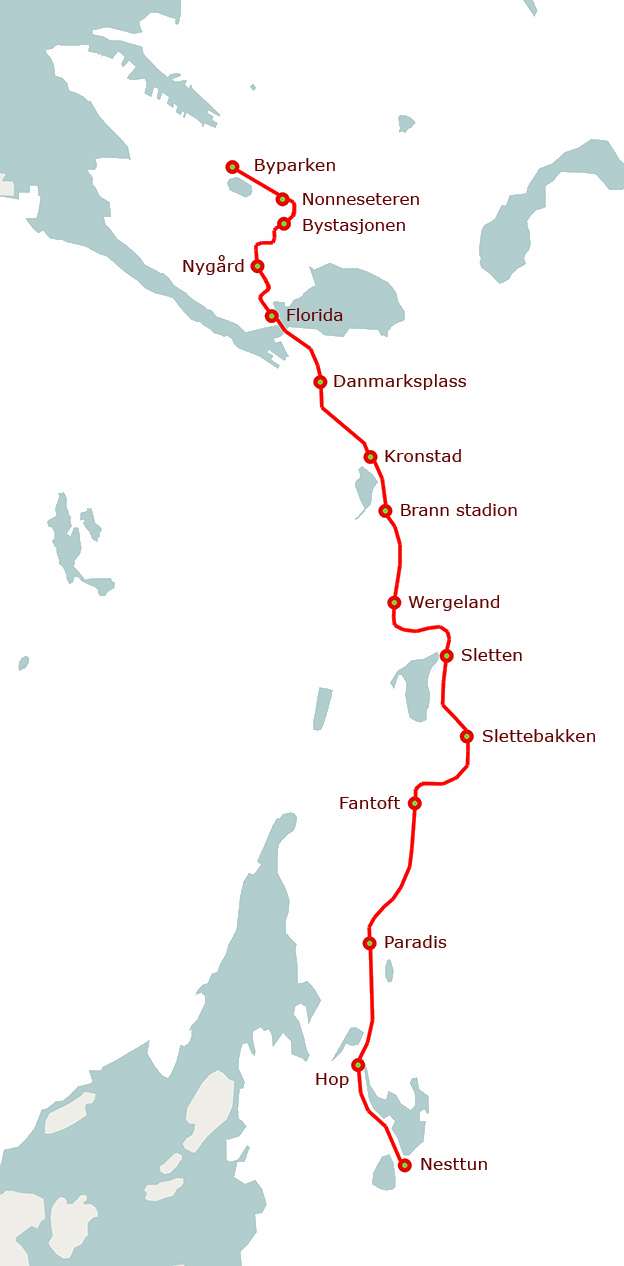
Map of the stations of the first stage

| Station | Stage | Opened | Transfers | Borough |
Line 1
| Byparken | 1 | 22 June 2010 | | Bergenhus |
| Nonneseter | 1 | 22 June 2010 | Bergen station, Line 2 | Bergenhus |
| Bystasjonen | 1 | 22 June 2010 | Bergen bus station | Bergenhus |
| Nygård | 1 | 22 June 2010 | | Bergenhus |
| Florida | 1 | 22 June 2010 | | Bergenhus |
| Danmarksplass | 1 | 22 June 2010 | | Årstad |
| Kronstad | 1 | 22 June 2010 | | Årstad |
| Brann stadion | 1 | 22 June 2010 | | Årstad |
| Wergeland | 1 | 22 June 2010 | | Årstad |
| Sletten | 1 | 22 June 2010 | | Årstad |
| Slettebakken | 1 | 22 June 2010 | | Årstad |
| Fantoft | 1 | 22 June 2010 | | Årstad |
| Paradis | 1 | 22 June 2010 | | Fana |
| Hop | 1 | 22 June 2010 | | Fana |
| Nesttun | 1 | 22 June 2010 | Nesttun bus terminal | Fana |
| Nesttun Sentrum | 2 | 21 June 2013 | | Fana |
| Skjoldskiftet | 2 | 21 June 2013 | | Fana |
| Mårdalen | 2 | 21 June 2013 | | Fana |
| Skjold | 2 | 21 June 2013 | | Fana |
| Lagunen | 2 | 21 June 2013 | Lagunen bus terminal | Fana |
| Råstølen | 3 | 15 August 2016 | | Ytrebygda |
| Sandslivegen | 3 | 15 August 2016 | | Ytrebygda |
| Sandslimarka | 3 | 15 August 2016 | | Ytrebygda |
| Kokstad | 3 | 15 August 2016 | | Ytrebygda |
| Birkelandsskiftet | 3 | 15 August 2016 | Birkelandsskiftet bus terminal | Ytrebygda |
| Kokstadflaten | 3 | 24 April 2017 | | Ytrebygda |
| Bergen lufthavn Flesland | 3 | 24 April 2017 | Bergen Airport, Flesland | Ytrebygda |
Line 2
| Kaigaten | 4 | 21 November 2022 | | Bergenhus |
| Nonneseter | 4 | 22 June 2010 | Line 1, Bergen station | Bergenhus |
| Bergen busstasjon | 4 | 21 November 2022 | Line 1, Bergen bus station | Bergenhus |
| Fløen | 4 | 21 November 2022 | | Bergenhus |
| Haukeland sjukehus | 4 | 21 November 2022 | | Årstad |
| Kronstad | 4 | 21 November 2022 | | Årstad |
| Mindemyren | 4 | 21 November 2022 | | Årstad |
| Kristianborg | 4 | 21 November 2022 | | Årstad |
| Fyllingsdalen terminal | 4 | 21 November 2022 | Fyllingsdalen bus terminal | Fyllingsdalen |
Future
| Torget | | TBD | Torget bus interchange | Bergenhus |
| Sandbrogaten | | TBD | | Bergenhus |
| Sandviken kirke | | TBD | | Bergenhus |
| Amalie Skrams vei | | TBD | | Bergenhus |
| Sandviken sykehus | | TBD | | Bergenhus |
| NHH | | TBD | | Bergenhus |
| Eidsvåg | | TBD | | Åsane |
| Tertneskrysset | | TBD | | Åsane |
| Åsane terminal | | TBD | Åsane bus terminal | Åsane |
| Åsane Sentrum | | TBD | | Åsane |
| Nyborg | | TBD | | Åsane |
| Langarinden | | TBD | | Åsane |
| Vågsbotn | | TBD | | Åsane |
