= List of awards and nominations received by Chawarin Perdpiriyawong =

Chawarin Perdpiriyawong awards and nominations
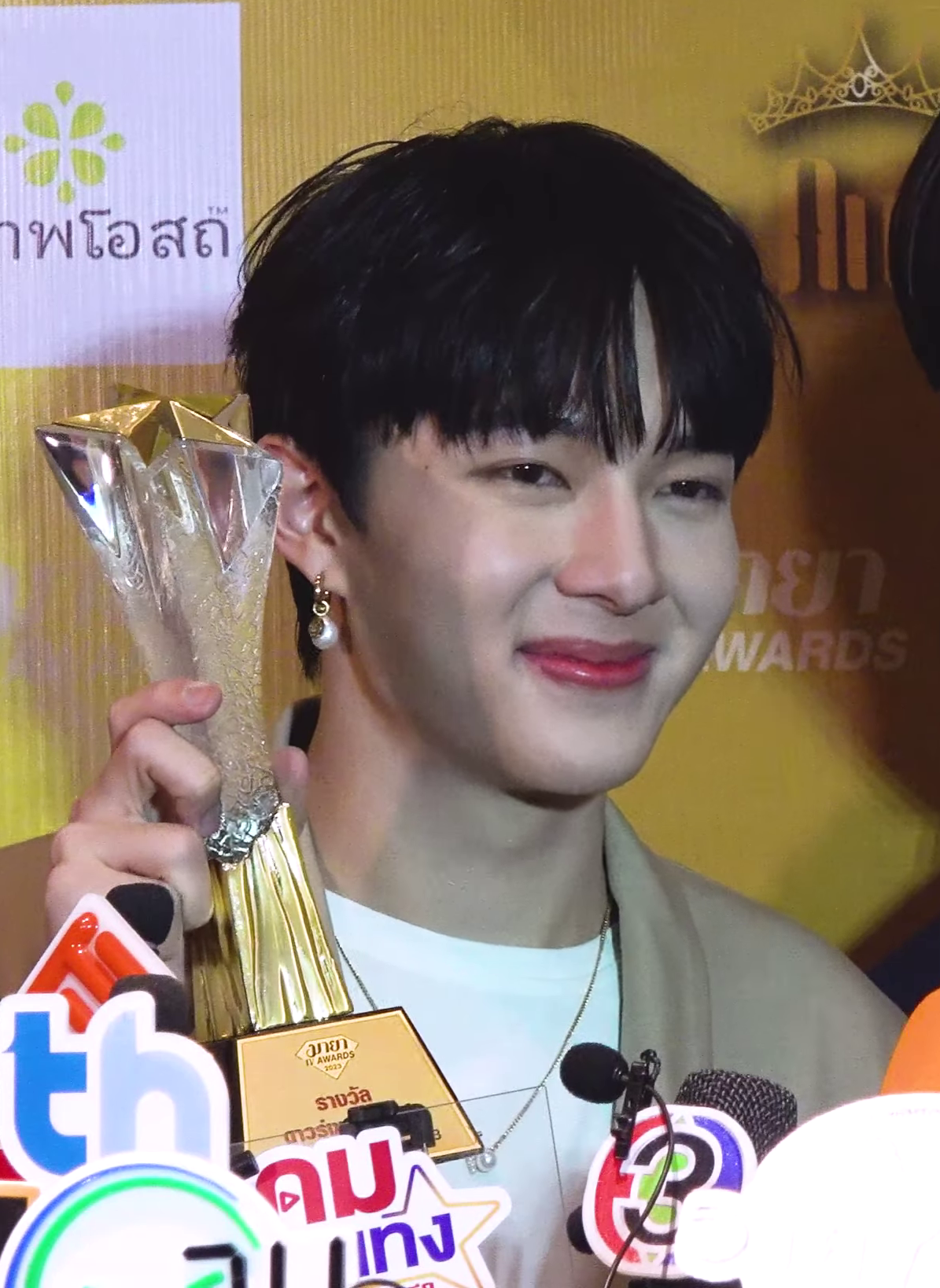
- Perdpiriyawong at Maya TV Awards 2023
Awards and nominations
Award	Wins	Nominations
Bangkok Pride Awards	0	2
Dailynews Awards	0	2
Feed x Khaosod Awards	0	5
Feed Y Capital Awards	2	3
Heavenly Awards	1	1
HOFS Awards	1	1
Howe Awards	5	9
Japan Expo Awards	1	1
Kazz Awards	7	11
Kom Chad Luek Awards	3	8
Line Melody Music Awards	1	5
Line Melody Music Chart	4	4
Manimekhala Awards	2	2
Maya Superstar Idol Awards	3	5
Maya TV Awards	3	15
MChoice & Mint Awards	2	2
Mellow Pop	1	1
Nakarat Awards	0	1
Nataraja Awards	1	1
Nine Entertain Awards	4	8
Nippon Haku Bangkok	1	1
Sanook Top of the Year Awards	3	8
Seoul Music Awards	1	1
Sudsapda Y Awards	2	3
Superstar Idol Awards	2	2
T-Pop of the Year Music Awards	2	2
Thailand Box Office Awards	2	3
Thailand Box Office Movie Awards	0	1
Thailand Headlines Person of the Year Awards	2	2
Thailand Master Youth	1	1
Thailand Social Awards	2	3
Thailand Y Content Awards	1	2
The Guitar Mag Awards	1	5
The People Awards	0	1
The Viral Hits Awards	0	4
TikTok Awards Thailand	1	1
Weibo International Entertainment Awards	1	1
Weibo Music Awards	1	2
YUniverse Awards	6	18
Y Entertain Awards	0	3
Zoomdara Awards	2	2

Totals (Note: Certain award groups do not simply award one winner. They acknowledge several different recipients, have runners-up, and have third place. Since this is a specific recognition and is different from losing an award, runner-up mentions are considered wins in this award tally. For simplification and to avoid errors, each award in this list has been presumed to have had a prior nomination.)
- Wins: 76
- Nominations: 153

This is a list of awards and nominations received by Chawarin Perdpiriyawong, a Thai actor and singer. The artist has received a total of 76 awards out of 153 nominations.

== Awards and nominations ==
Name of the award ceremony, year presented, category, nominee of the award, and the result of the nomination
Award	Year	Category	Nominee/work	Result	Ref.
Bangkok Pride Awards	2025	Pride Popular of Y Series Star	with Pruk Panich	Nominated	
Bangkok Pride Awards	2026	Pride Popular of Y Series Star	with Pruk Panich; The Next Prince	Nominated	
Dailynews Awards	2024	JinFinWer Award	with Pruk Panich	Nominated	
Dailynews Awards	2024	Superstar Award	Chawarin Perdpiriyawong	Nominated	
Feed x Khaosod Awards	2025	Top 10 Artist	Chawarin Perdpiriyawong	Nominated	
Feed x Khaosod Awards	2025	Most Popular Song	"Forever"	Nominated	
Feed x Khaosod Awards	2025	Best Couple of the Year	with Pruk Panich; The Next Prince	Nominated	
Feed x Khaosod Awards	2026	Popular Artist	Chawarin Perdpiriyawong	Nominated	
Feed x Khaosod Awards	2026	Most Popular Song	"New Season"	Nominated	
Feed Y Capital Awards	2022	Y Actor of the Year Award	Chawarin Perdpiriyawong	Won	
Feed Y Capital Awards	2023	Best Couple Award	with Pruk Panich; Cutie Pie	Nominated	
Feed Y Capital Awards	2024	Most Popular Thai Pop Song Award	"Unforgettable"	Won	
Heavenly Awards	2023	Best Couple Award	with Pruk Panich; Cutie Pie	Won	
HOFS Awards	2024	Trending Couple of Social Media Hall of Fame	with Pruk Panich	Won	
Howe Awards	2022	Best Couple Award	with Pruk Panich; Cutie Pie	Won	
Howe Awards	2023	Best Couple Award	with Pruk Panich; Cutie Pie	Nominated	
Howe Awards	2024	Popular Vote Award	Chawarin Perdpiriyawong	Won	
Howe Awards	2024	Hottest Male Singer Award	Chawarin Perdpiriyawong	Won	
Howe Awards	2024	Best Couple Award	with Pruk Panich	Nominated	
Howe Awards	2025	Hottest Male Singer Award	Chawarin Perdpiriyawong	Won	
Howe Awards	2025	50 Influential People	Chawarin Perdpiriyawong	Won	
Howe Awards	2025	Best Couple Award	with Pruk Panich; The Next Prince	Nominated	
Howe Awards	2026	Hottest Singer Award	Chawarin Perdpiriyawong	Won	
Japan Expo Awards	2026	Popular Star Award	Chawarin Perdpiriyawong	Won	
Kazz Awards	2022	Shining Star of the Year	Chawarin Perdpiriyawong	Won	
Kazz Awards	2022	Hottest Artist	Chawarin Perdpiriyawong	Won	
Kazz Awards	2023	Couple of the Year	with Pruk Panich; Cutie Pie	Nominated	
Kazz Awards	2023	Popular Male Artist Award	Chawarin Perdpiriyawong	Won	
Kazz Awards	2023	Popular Male Teenage Award	Chawarin Perdpiriyawong	Won	
Kazz Awards	2024	Popular Male Teenage Award	Chawarin Perdpiriyawong	Won	
Kazz Awards	2025	Popular Male Artist Award	Chawarin Perdpiriyawong	Won	
Kazz Awards	2025	Favorite Award Kazz Magazine	with Pruk Panich	Won	
Kazz Awards	2026	Popular Artist Award	Chawarin Perdpiriyawong	Nominated	
Kazz Awards	2026	Popular Male Teenage Award	Chawarin Perdpiriyawong	Nominated	
Kazz Awards	2026	Couple of the Year	with Pruk Panich; The Next Prince	Nominated	
Kom Chad Luek Awards	2023	The Most Popular International Thai Singer	Chawarin Perdpiriyawong	Nominated	
Kom Chad Luek Awards	2023	Best New Artist	Chawarin Perdpiriyawong	Nominated	
Kom Chad Luek Awards	2023	The Most Popular Y Couple	with Pruk Panich; Cutie Pie	Won	
Kom Chad Luek Awards	2024	The Most Popular International Thai Singer	Chawarin Perdpiriyawong	Won	
Kom Chad Luek Awards	2024	Popular Screen Couple	with Pruk Panich	Nominated	
Kom Chad Luek Awards	2025	Popular Thai Pop Singer	Chawarin Perdpiriyawong	Won	
Kom Chad Luek Awards	2026	Most Popular Thai Pop Singer	Chawarin Perdpiriyawong	Nominated	
Kom Chad Luek Awards	2026	Popular BL (Boys' Love) Couples	with Pruk Panich; The Next Prince	Won	
Line Melody Music Awards	2022	Melody of the Year	"True Love"	Nominated	
Line Melody Music Awards	2023	Melody of the Year	"Anything"	Nominated	
Line Melody Music Awards	2023	Line Melody Best Male Artist 2023	Chawarin Perdpiriyawong	Nominated	
Line Melody Music Awards	2024	Line Melody Most Favourite 2024	Chawarin Perdpiriyawong	Won	
Line Melody Music Awards	2025	Best Male Artist 2025	Chawarin Perdpiriyawong	Nominated	
Line Melody Music Chart	2022	Black Melody Award (November)	"True Love"	Won	
Line Melody Music Chart	2023	Top 5 Line Melody Award (July)	"Anything"	3rd place	
Line Melody Music Chart	2023	Black Melody Award (July)	"Anything"	Won	
Line Melody Music Chart	2024	Black Melody Award (September)	"Your Season"	Won	
Manimekhala Awards	2022	Outstanding Y Couple Award	with Pruk Panich; Cutie Pie	Won	
Manimekhala Awards	2022	Outstanding New Star – Y Series	Chawarin Perdpiriyawong	Won	
Maya Superstar Idol Awards	2026	Popular Male Couple of the Year	with Pruk Panich; The Next Prince	Won	
Maya Superstar Idol Awards	2026	Best Series Soundtrack of the Year	"The Sky Beside You"	Nominated	
Maya Superstar Idol Awards	2026	Best Actor of the Year	Chawarin Perdpiriyawong	Won	
Maya Superstar Idol Awards	2026	Best Rising Star Actor of the Year	Chawarin Perdpiriyawong	Won	
Maya Superstar Idol Awards	2026	Idol of the Year	Chawarin Perdpiriyawong	Nominated	
Maya TV Awards	2023	Male Rising Star of the Year Award	Chawarin Perdpiriyawong	Won	
Maya TV Awards	2023	Best Couple of the Year Award	with Pruk Panich; Cutie Pie	Nominated	
Maya TV Awards	2023	Best Original Soundtrack	"My Cutie Pie"	Nominated	
Maya TV Awards	2023	Best Original Soundtrack	"True Love"	Won	
Maya TV Awards	2023	Maya Popularity Award	Chawarin Perdpiriyawong	Nominated	
Maya TV Awards	2024	Charming Male of the Year	Chawarin Perdpiriyawong	Nominated	
Maya TV Awards	2024	Couple of the Year	with Pruk Panich	Nominated	
Maya TV Awards	2024	T-Pop Artist of the Year	Chawarin Perdpiriyawong	Nominated	
Maya TV Awards	2024	Original Soundtrack of the Year	"Destiny"	Won	
Maya TV Awards	2025	T-Pop Artist of the Year	Chawarin Perdpiriyawong	Won	
Maya TV Awards	2025	Maya Popularity Award	Chawarin Perdpiriyawong	Won	
Maya TV Awards	2025	Male Couple of the Year	with Pruk Panich; The Next Prince	Won	
Maya TV Awards	2026	Artist of the Year	Chawarin Perdpiriyawong	Nominated	
Maya TV Awards	2026	Popular Vote	Chawarin Perdpiriyawong	Nominated	
Maya TV Awards	2026	Male Couple of the Year	with Pruk Panich	Won	
MChoice & Mint Awards	2022	Rookie of the Year	Chawarin Perdpiriyawong	Won	
MChoice & Mint Awards	2023	Best Cover of the Year	with Pruk Panich	Won	
Mellow Pop	2022	Top Music of the Month (September)	"Baby Boo"	Won	
Nakarat Awards	2026	Popular Vote	Chawarin Perdpiriyawong	Nominated	
Nataraja Awards	2023	Best OST	"True Love"	Won	
Nine Entertain Awards	2023	Fan's Favorite	with Pruk Panich; Cutie Pie	Nominated	
Nine Entertain Awards	2024	Couple of the Year	with Pruk Panich	Nominated	
Nine Entertain Awards	2024	People's Favorite	Chawarin Perdpiriyawong	Won	
Nine Entertain Awards	2025	Thai Global Rising Star	Chawarin Perdpiriyawong	Won	
Nine Entertain Awards	2025	People's Favorite	Chawarin Perdpiriyawong	Won	
Nine Entertain Awards	2025	Couple of the Year	with Pruk Panich	Nominated	
Nine Entertain Awards	2026	People's Favorite	Chawarin Perdpiriyawong	Won	
Nine Entertain Awards	2026	Couple of the Year	with Pruk Panich; The Next Prince	Nominated	
Nippon Haku Bangkok	2024	Thailand-Japan Friendship Honorary Award	with Pruk Panich	Won	
Sanook Top of the Year Awards	2022	Shipped Couple of the Year	with Pruk Panich; Cutie Pie	Won	
Sanook Top of the Year Awards	2022	Rising Male Star of the Year	Chawarin Perdpiriyawong	Won	
Sanook Top of the Year Awards	2023	Hit Song of the Year	"Anything"	Won	
Sanook Top of the Year Awards	2023	Top Artist of the Year	Chawarin Perdpiriyawong	Nominated	
Sanook Top of the Year Awards	2023	Best Couple of the Year	with Pruk Panich	Nominated	
Sanook Top of the Year Awards	2024	Sanook Top of the Year (Popular Vote)	Chawarin Perdpiriyawong	Nominated	
Sanook Top of the Year Awards	2025	Most Iconic Couple	with Pruk Panich	Nominated	
Sanook Top of the Year Awards	2025	Sanook Top of the Year (Popular Vote)	Chawarin Perdpiriyawong	Nominated	
Seoul Music Awards	2024	Thai Best Artist Award	with Pruk Panich	Won	
Sudsapda Y Awards	2022	The Rising Star Duo of the Year	with Pruk Panich; Cutie Pie	Won	
Sudsapda Y Awards	2022	Actor of the Year	Chawarin Perdpiriyawong	Won	
Sudsapda Y Awards	2022	Favorite Social Media Star	Chawarin Perdpiriyawong	Nominated	
Superstar Idol Awards	2025	Superstar Male Couple	with Pruk Panich	Won	
Superstar Idol Awards	2025	Superstar Idol of the Year	Chawarin Perdpiriyawong	Won	
T-Pop of the Year Music Awards	2022	Best Music of the Year (OST)	"True Love"	Won	
T-Pop of the Year Music Awards	2023	Best Music of the Year (Rookie)	"Anything"	Won	
Thailand Headlines Person of the Year Awards	2025	Popular Male	Chawarin Perdpiriyawong	Won	
Thailand Headlines Person of the Year Awards	2025	The Most Influential Thai BL Couple	with Pruk Panich	Won	
Thailand Box Office Awards	2025	Couple of the Year (Series)	with Pruk Panich; The Next Prince	Nominated	
Thailand Box Office Awards	2025	Actor of the Year (Series)	Chawarin Perdpiriyawong	Won	
Thailand Box Office Awards	2025	Original Theme Song of the Year (Series)	"The Sky Beside You"	Won	
Thailand Box Office Movie Awards	2023	Actor of the Year	After Sundown	Nominated	
Thailand Master Youth	2023	Youth Favorite Actor	Chawarin Perdpiriyawong	Won	
Thailand Social Awards	2024	Best Creator Performance on Social Media – Actor & Actress	After Sundown	Won	
Thailand Social Awards	2025	Best Creator Performance on Social Media – Solo Male Artist	Chawarin Perdpiriyawong	Nominated	
Thailand Social Awards	2026	Best Entertainment Figures Performance on Social Media – Actor	Chawarin Perdpiriyawong	Won	
Thailand Y Content Awards	2025	Best On-screen Couple	with Pruk Panich; The Next Prince	Won	
Thailand Y Content Awards	2025	Popular Vote	Chawarin Perdpiriyawong	Nominated	
The Guitar Mag Awards	2024	Popular Vote	Chawarin Perdpiriyawong	Nominated	
The Guitar Mag Awards	2025	Star's Single Hits of the Year	"Your Season"	Nominated	
The Guitar Mag Awards	2025	Popular Vote	Chawarin Perdpiriyawong	Nominated	
The Guitar Mag Awards	2026	Star Singer Hits of the Year	Chawarin Perdpiriyawong	Won	
The Guitar Mag Awards	2026	Popular Vote	Chawarin Perdpiriyawong	Nominated	
The People Awards	2026	Popular of the Year	Chawarin Perdpiriyawong	Longlisted	
The Viral Hits Awards	2024	Best BL Series Couple of the Year	with Pruk Panich	Nominated	
The Viral Hits Awards	2025	Best BL Couple of the Year	with Pruk Panich; The Next Prince	Nominated	
The Viral Hits Awards	2025	Best Male Solo Artist of the Year	Chawarin Perdpiriyawong	Nominated	
The Viral Hits Awards	2025	Most Popular Rising Star of the Year	Chawarin Perdpiriyawong	Nominated	
TikTok Awards Thailand	2024	Music Artist of the Year	Chawarin Perdpiriyawong	Won	
Weibo International Entertainment Awards	2026	Artist on the Rise of the Year (Overseas)	Chawarin Perdpiriyawong	Won	
Weibo Music Awards	2025	Recommended Song of the Year	"Forever"	Nominated	
Weibo Music Awards	2025	Recommended Person of the Year (Overseas Singer)	Chawarin Perdpiriyawong	Won	
YUniverse Awards	2022	Best Couple	with Pruk Panich; Cutie Pie	Nominated	
YUniverse Awards	2022	Best Lead Actor	Chawarin Perdpiriyawong	Won	
YUniverse Awards	2022	Best Cuties	Chawarin Perdpiriyawong	Nominated	
YUniverse Awards	2022	Best OST for a Y Series	"My Cutie Pie"	Won	
YUniverse Awards	2022	Y Iconic Star	Chawarin Perdpiriyawong	Won	
YUniverse Awards	2023	Best Leading Role	Chawarin Perdpiriyawong	Nominated	
YUniverse Awards	2023	Best Cuties	Chawarin Perdpiriyawong	Won	
YUniverse Awards	2023	Y Iconic Star	Chawarin Perdpiriyawong	Nominated	
YUniverse Awards	2023	Best Couple	with Pruk Panich; Cutie Pie	Nominated	
YUniverse Awards	2023	Best Partner	with Pruk Panich; Cutie Pie	Won	
YUniverse Awards	2024	Best Soundtrack for a Series	"Forget About Us"	Nominated	
YUniverse Awards	2025	The Best Couple	with Pruk Panich; The Next Prince	Nominated	
YUniverse Awards	2025	Best Partner	with Pruk Panich; The Next Prince	Nominated	
YUniverse Awards	2025	The Best Leading Role	Chawarin Perdpiriyawong	Nominated	
YUniverse Awards	2025	Best Leading Actor/Actress	Chawarin Perdpiriyawong	Won	
YUniverse Awards	2025	The Best Series OST.	"Above"	Nominated	
YUniverse Awards	2025	The Best Cuties	Chawarin Perdpiriyawong	Nominated	
YUniverse Awards	2025	Y Iconic Star	Chawarin Perdpiriyawong	Nominated	
Y Entertain Awards	2025	Prince of Boys' Love	Chawarin Perdpiriyawong	Nominated	
Y Entertain Awards	2025	Y Couple of the Year	with Pruk Panich; The Next Prince	Nominated	
Y Entertain Awards	2025	Best Series OST. of the Year	"Above"	Nominated	
Zoomdara Awards	2025	People's Favorite Zoomdara of the Year	Chawarin Perdpiriyawong	Won	
Zoomdara Awards	2025	The Hottest Male Couple of the Year	with Pruk Panich	Won	
