= The Next Prince =

2025 Thai television series

- Official poster
- Also known as: ข้ามฟ้าเคียงเธอ
- Genre: Romance; Boys' love
- Based on: ข้ามฟ้าเคียงเธอ by Ceo ft. Ennice
- Screenplay by: Amornphorn Phaendinthong (consultant); Wanna Kortanyawat; Thidaporn Pruksamasvong; Duangporn Jearnsutamporn
- Directed by: Aoftionz Kittipat Champa; Panuwat Inthawat
- Starring: Chawarin Perdpiriyawong; Pruk Panich; Karn Kritsanaphan; Thanakrit Jiamchanya; Siraphop Manithikhun; Radchapon Phornpinit
- Theme music composer: Chapavich Temnitikul
- Opening theme: "Welcome to Emmaly"
- Ending theme: "Above" by NuNew (episodes 2, 14); "I Trust You" by Daou Pittaya (episodes 3–5); "Still You" by The Toys (episode 6); "I Need Your Love" by NuNew (episodes 7–9); "Our Night" by Zee Pruk (episodes 10–13)
- Country of origin: Thailand
- Original language: Thai
- No. of episodes: 14

Production
- Producers: Kornkanok Rangsimontakul; Gigga Sabaiyong
- Running time: 55–66 minutes
- Production companies: Domundi; Mandee Work Company Ltd.

Original release
- Network: One 31; iQIYI
- Release: May 3 – August 2, 2025

The Next Prince (Thai: ข้ามฟ้าเคียงเธอ; RTGS: Kham fa khiang thoe, lit. 'Across the Sky Beside You') is a 2025 Thai boys' love romance drama television series, starring Chawarin Perdpiriyawong and Pruk Panich, based on the same title two-volume novel by writing duo Ceo ft. Ennice, which was published between 2022 and 2023.

It aired from May 3 to August 2, 2025 on One 31 every Saturday at 21:30 (BMT) for 14 episodes; the uncut version was available on iQIYI one hour later. It was also distributed on Rakuten TV in Japan and Heavenly in South Korea. A slightly re-edited version, labeled "hidden cut", was released on Netflix SEA on November 15, 2025.

== Synopsis ==
In the kingdom of Emmaly, the heirs of the Assavadevathin, Bhuchongpisut, Davichmetha and Meenanagarin noble families spar in a fencing tournament to decide which of their fathers will become the next prince to the throne. In light of his deteriorating health, the current king sends Charan, his most trusted palace guard, to retrieve his grandson Khanin Assavadevathin, who grew up abroad without knowing his true identity. As Khanin gets used to his new life in the palace, Charan is by his side to help him prepare for the royal competition and to protect Khanin from those who want to harm him. With time, the two gradually form a strong bond that trascends their duties and fall in love.

== Cast and characters ==
- Chawarin Perdpiriyawong (NuNew) as Khanin Assavadevathin, a royal prince who has been raised as a commoner in London
  - Chaiyaphat Eaksamutchai as child Khanin
- Pruk Panich (Zee) as Charan Phithakthewa, a royal guard serving the Assavadevathin family who teaches art at Morpheus University
  - Pannawit Tritsadee as child Charan
- Nirut Sirijanya as Thipokbowon Assavadevathin, the current sovereign of Emmaly and Khanin's grandfather
- Karn Kritsanaphan (Jimmy) as Ramil Bhuchongpisut, a royal prince
- Thanakrit Chiamchunya (Ohm) as Paitay Ronawee, the Ministry of Defense's son and Ramil's confidant
- Siraphop Manithikhun (Net) as Calvin, a foreign prince from Bhujar
- Radchapon Phornpinit (JJ) as Jay Jirat, an art student at Morpheus University
- Maethanee Buranasiri as Chana Davichmetha, the western capital ruler and Ava's father
- Phurit Prombandal as Wasin Meenanagarin, the southern capital ruler
- Saksit Tangthong as Thatdanai Keerakul, a royal guard who raised Khanin as his son
- Phollawat Manuprasert as Tharin Assavadevathin, the northern capital ruler and Khanin's biological father
- Teerapong Leowrakwong as Rachata Bhuchongpisut, the eastern capital ruler and Ramil's father
- Trakan Punthumlerdrujee as Wirun, Thipokbowon's butler
- Daweerit Chullasapya as Siwakorn, Rachata's butler
- Kochakorn Nimakorn as Marisa, Wasin's late wife who came from Assavadevathin
- Suancsuda Lawanprasert as Chita, Charan's mother and royal guard
- Chutima Teepanart as Kunita Assavadevathin, Khanin's late mother who came from Bhuchongpisut
- Tanawat Cheawaram (Ballchon) as Chakri, Khanin's butler
- Wisarut Himarat (Most) as Vetith, an undercover agent and Charan's friend
- Charintip Rungthanakiat (Kris) as Ava Davichmetha, a royal princess
- Plaifah Siraacha as Mira Kitakhan, Ava's coach in fencing and archery
- Juckkit Amarat as Hawl, King of Bhujar and Calvin's father
- Thitinan Rattanathitinan (Tanggo) as Paul, Khanin's friend in London
- Chanidapa Phornpinit (Maam) as June, Jay's sister

== Production ==
=== Development ===
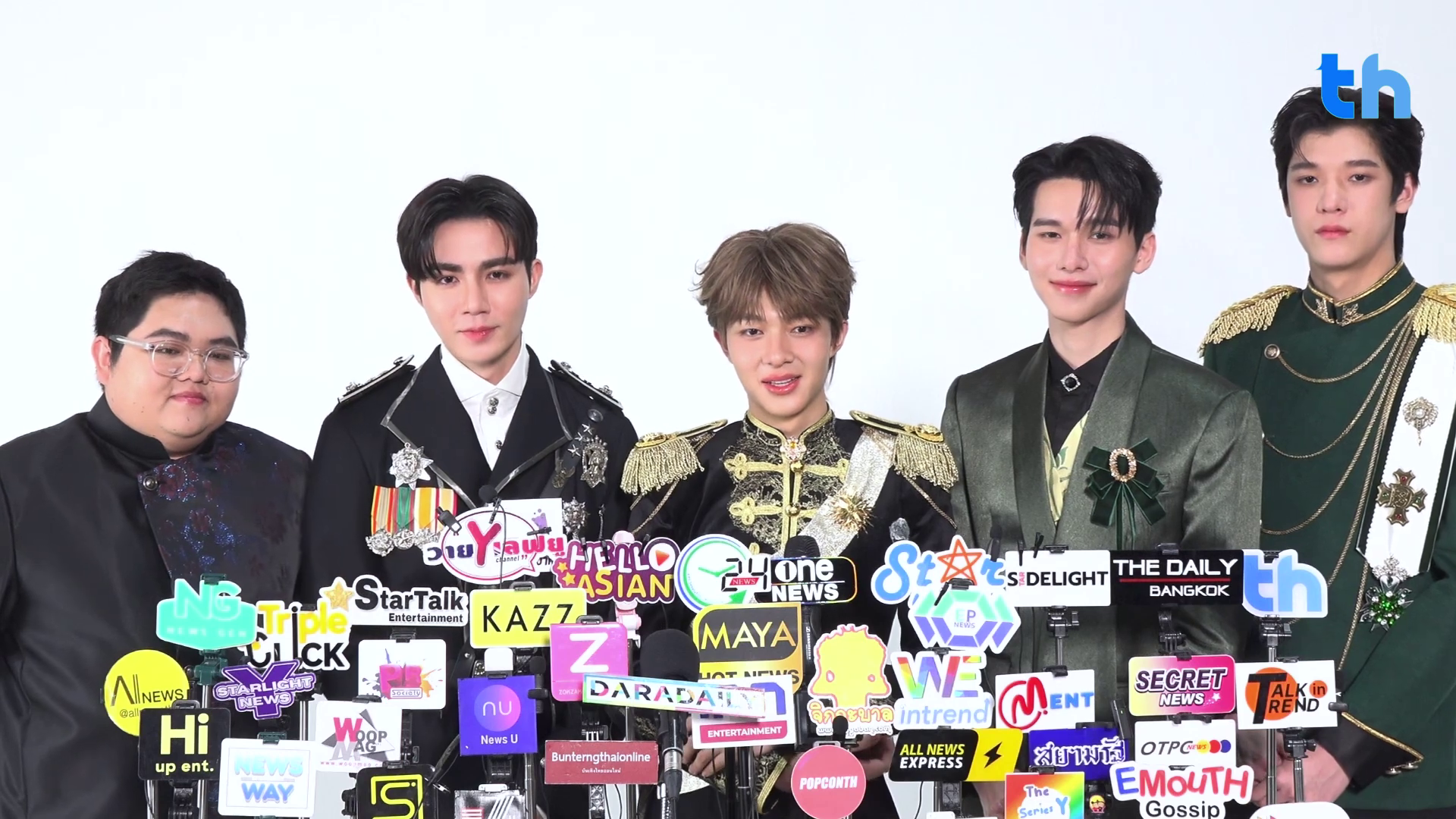
From left to right: cast members Tanawat Cheawaram (Ballchon), Pruk Panich (Zee), Chawarin Perdpiriyawong (NuNew), Thanakrit Chiamchunya (Ohm), and Karn Kritsanaphan (Jimmy) on July 9, 2024

After starring together in Cutie Pie in 2022, Chawarin Perdpiriyawong and Pruk Panich were asked by their company CEO Aoftionz Kittipat Champa what kind of series they would have liked to be in next, and Panich expressed his wish to play a royal guard. Champa then asked Ceo and Ennice to write a book about it, and the characters of the original novel were based on the two actors. The production of the TV series The Next Prince was announced on December 13, 2022 as part of Domundi's 2023 line-up, with Chawarin Perdpiriyawong and Pruk Panich set to play prince Khanin and his royal guard Charan.

The budget was then reported to be more than 30 million baht, but ultimately neared nine figures because the production team had to create all the necessary props and make the locations seem foreign, as the series is set in the fictional country of Emmaly. In an interview with Workpoint Today, Perdpiriyawong estimated the budget at around 120 million baht. As the novel was too short for a 14-episode series, the TV adaptation added new elements to the plot. To prepare for their roles, the cast had to learn fencing, and Perdpiriyawong also took piano, dancing and archery lessons. The costumes, of which almost 100 for prince Khanin, were designed by Unkuniya, while the background score was recorded by a full orchestra.

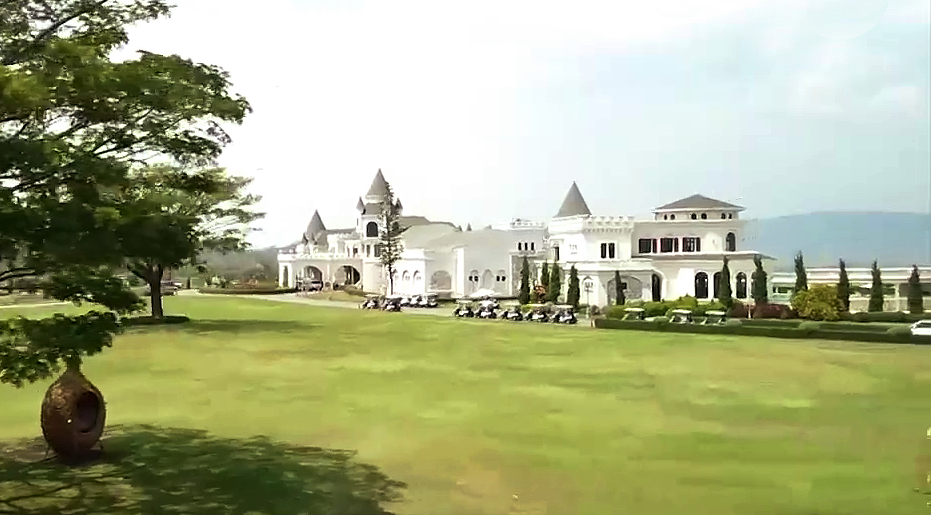
Mövenpick Resort Khao Yai serves both as the exteriors to the royal palace of Emmaly (pictured) and the suburbs of London.

After a worship ceremony held on July 18, filming started in Thailand on August 19, 2024 and ended on July 16, 2025. The production team did not buy stock footage for the scenes set in England, but asked for the help of a local team, who used the same equipment of the Thailand crew to film on-site. Locations include the Mövenpick Resort Khao Yai in the Nakhon Ratchasima province, Northeast Thailand; Chatuchak Market; La Chapelle Bangkok in Tha Raeng; Pattaya, and Finsbury Square, London.

Teetut Chungmanirat (Thomas) and Kongpob Jirojmontri had initially been cast as Calvin and Jay, respectively, but withdrew on August 30, 2024 due to scheduling conflicts between filming The Next Prince and Your Sky, another Domundi series in which they starred as leads. On October 30, Siraphop Manithikhun (Net) and Radchapon Phornpinit (JJ) joined the production as their replacements.

=== Marketing ===
Together with the announcement of the series in December 2022, a short pilot teaser was disclosed to the public. An 8-minute pilot trailer was subsequently released on March 31, 2024. The official trailer was released on March 11, 2025. The first episode was partially screened to the press and attending fans during the series' premiere at Iconsiam on April 26, 2025; on the same day, a behind-the-scene documentary was released on IQIYI and Mandee's YouTube channel. A public screening was held for episodes 7 and 14 alongside the cast and crew, together with an exhibition of costumes and props used during the series.

== Episodes ==
No.	Title	Original release date
1	"Episode 1"	May 3, 2025
Khanin is an ordinary boy living in London, until one day a mysterious man named Charan shows up at his house and Khanin learns that he is a royal prince. Khanin does not want to follow Charan to the kingdom of Emmaly, but then several men break in and threaten the prince's life.
2	"Episode 2"	May 10, 2025
Khanin and Charan flee London to get to Emmaly as hired assassins chase them.
3	"Episode 3"	May 17, 2025
King Thipokbowon announces the return of his long-lost grandson Khanin. The young prince does not want to take part in the Royal Fencing Competition to determine the next king, but when he is told that his adoptive father has died, Khanin changes his mind to find out who killed him. Meanwhile, Charan sets out to discover the mole in the royal palace and if Thatdanai is dead for real.
4	"Episode 4"	May 24, 2025
A trivial accident triggers rumors of a romantic relationship between Khanin and Charan. When Charan tells him that one of their aggressors worked for the Bhuchongpisuts, Khanin insists on going there to investigate, but ends up getting lost and hurt during a mountain hike with Ramil. King Thipokbowon decides to separate Khanin and Charan to prevent them from getting too attached.
5	"Episode 5"	May 31, 2025
Charan has been ordered to take care of a new student at Morpheus University, Calvin, and has no time to serve Khanin. Upset by the royal guard's absence from the palace, Khanin goes looking for Charan and questions him about his oath of loyalty. A test of ingenuity and archery are added to the Royal Fencing Competition: at Khanin's insistence, the king agrees to have Charan train him.
6	"Episode 6"	June 7, 2025
Khanin and Charan grow closer while Khanin trains for the competition. During a trip to Davichmetha, Charan panics under a sudden downpour and shares his childhood trauma related to his mother leaving him on a rainy night. Khanin comforts him and the two share a kiss.
7	"Episode 7"	June 14, 2025
Charan is confined for putting Khanin in danger, and Rachata successfully plants one of his men as the prince's new coach; however, when Khanin gets poisoned during archery training, Charan is reinstated. The prince and his royal guard confirm their feelings for each other and spend the night together.
8	"Episode 8"	June 21, 2025
Khanin visits Meenanagarin and attends a protest against dust pollution, but things take a turn for the worse after a man blames the Assavadevathin's mine of killing people.
9	"Episode 9"	June 28, 2025
As a man – supposedly at the king's orders – tries to kill Ramil, Khanin and Thipokbowon clash over the prince's interest in the protests surrounding the Assavadevathin mine. Vetith finds Thatdanai.
10	"Episode 10"	July 5, 2025
Khanin spots Thatdanai at the lantern festival, but does not have a chance to talk to him due to a sudden protest advocating for environmental change. The prince sets his mind on winning the upcoming Competition to gain the power to improve the people's living conditions.
11	"Episode 11"	July 12, 2025
The first round of the Royal Competition, in which the people has to evaluate the three heirs in a test of wit over Emmaly politics, takes place. Thipokbowon counts on Khanin's popularity to secure his grandson's victory, but Rachata rigs the vote in Ramil's favor.
12	"Episode 12"	July 19, 2025
A terrorist attack takes place on the archery court during the second round of the Royal Competition. Thatdanai finally reports to the king, revealing Wasin as the mastermind. Wasin tries to kill the royal family, but in the end, he is shot dead.
13	"Episode 13"	July 26, 2025
The noble families decide to continue with the Royal Competition and have the winner decided by the fencing match. Ava withdraws from the competition.
14	"Episode 14"	August 2, 2025
Khanin wins the Royal Competition, securing the throne for the Assavadevathins. As Tharin becomes the new king of Emmaly following Thipokbowon's passing, Khanin goes back to London with Thatdanai and Chakri to live a normal life. Shortly after, Charan quits his job as a royal guard and joins Khanin in the United Kingdom. Charan finally confesses his love and proposes to Khanin, who says yes.

== Original soundtrack ==
No.	Title	Lyrics	Music	Artist	Length
1.	"Above" (เหนือฟ้า)	Amp Achariya Dulyapaiboon	Amp Achariya Dulyapaiboon	NuNew	3:50
2.	"I Trust You"	Worachet Thanupongcharat	Worachet Thanupongcharat	Daou Pittaya	3:30
3.	"Moonlit Magic"	Amp Achariya Dulyapaiboon	Amp Achariya Dulyapaiboon	Amp Achariya	2:19
4.	"Still You" (ฝากรัก)	The Toys; Marc Tatchapon	The Toys	The Toys	2:22
5.	"New Dawn"	Amp Achariya Dulyapaiboon	Amp Achariya Dulyapaiboon	NuNew	1:36
6.	"I Need Your Love"	Amp Achariya Dulyapaiboon	Amp Achariya Dulyapaiboon	NuNew	4:01
7.	"Above (Orchestra Version)" (เหนือฟ้า (Orchestra Version))	Amp Achariya Dulyapaiboon	Amp Achariya Dulyapaiboon	NuNew	3:52
8.	"Our Night"	Amp Achariya Dulyapaiboon	Amp Achariya Dulyapaiboon	Zee Pruk	2:57
9.	"The Sky Beside You" (ฟ้าที่เคียงเธอ)	Pinpin	Pinpin	Zee Pruk, NuNew	4:09

The Next Prince Original Score

No.	Title	Music	Length
1.	"Welcome to Emmaly (Main Theme)"	Chapavich Temnitikul	2:06
2.	"Throne Room"	Chapavich Temnitikul	2:29
3.	"Emmaly Charm"	Pongtorn Techaboonakho	1:15
4.	"Above"	Hualampong Riddim	4:16
5.	"Above (Drama)"	Hualampong Riddim	3:09
6.	"I Need Your Love"	Hualampong Riddim	4:08
7.	"I Need Your Love (Drama)"	Hualampong Riddim	3:42
8.	"Marching"	Pongtorn Techaboonakho	2:30
9.	"Prince's Suite"	Pongtorn Techaboonakho	2:57
10.	"Victorious"	Pongtorn Techaboonakho	3:50
11.	"Jolly Pizz"	Pongtorn Techaboonakho	1:34
12.	"Sunny Garden"	Pongtorn Techaboonakho	2:36
13.	"Spring Garden"	Pongtorn Techaboonakho	2:06
14.	"Tea Time"	Pongtorn Techaboonakho	2:05
15.	"The Prom"	Pongtorn Techaboonakho	1:47
16.	"Make a Move"	Pongtorn Techaboonakho	2:13
17.	"Across the Sky"	Pongtorn Techaboonakho	3:41
18.	"Our Hope"	Pongtorn Techaboonakho	2:22
19.	"Obsession"	Pongtorn Techaboonakho	2:41
20.	"Deep Obsession"	Pongtorn Techaboonakho	2:41
Total length:			54:08

== Reception ==
The Next Prince has been complimented for its compelling storyline, chemistry between leads, and high production values. The Thai Post defined it "spectacular and meticously detailed." The series trended at #1 on X in Thailand and worldwide every week during its run, and was a trending topic in more than 29 countries. It also ranked #1 in terms of views on the IQIYI app. In Japan, it was the third most watched boys' love series in the first half of 2025 on Rakuten TV.

=== Accolades ===
Name of award ceremony, year presented, award category, nominee of award, and result of nomination
Award	Year	Category	Nominee/work	Result	Ref.
Bangkok Pride Awards	2026	Pride Popular of Series/Drama (BL)	The Next Prince	Nominated	
Bangkok Pride Awards	2026	Pride Popular of Y Series Star	Pruk Panich and Chawarin Perdpiriyawong	Nominated	
Feed x Khaosod Awards	2025	Most Popular Series/Drama	The Next Prince	Won	
Feed x Khaosod Awards	2025	Top-Tier BL Series of the Year	The Next Prince	Nominated	
Feed x Khaosod Awards	2025	Best Couple of the Year	Pruk Panich and Chawarin Perdpiriyawong	Nominated	
Howe Awards	2025	Outstanding Production of the Year	The Next Prince	Won	
Howe Awards	2025	Hottest Actor Award	Pruk Panich	Nominated	
Howe Awards	2025	Best Couple Award	Pruk Panich and Chawarin Perdpiriyawong	Nominated	
Kazz Awards	2026	Series of the Year	The Next Prince	Won	
Kazz Awards	2026	Best Actor of the Year	Pruk Panich	Nominated	
Kazz Awards	2026	Couple of the Year	Pruk Panich and Chawarin Perdpiriyawong	Nominated	
Kom Chad Luek Awards	2026	Popular BL (Boys' Love) Couples	Pruk Panich and Chawarin Perdpiriyawong	Won	
Kom Chad Luek Awards	2026	Popular Male Actor	Pruk Panich	Nominated	
Maya Superstar Idol Awards	2026	Popular Male Couple of the Year	Pruk Panich and Chawarin Perdpiriyawong	Won	
Maya Superstar Idol Awards	2026	Best Series Soundtrack of the Year	"The Sky Beside You"	Nominated	
Maya Superstar Idol Awards	2026	Best Actor of the Year	Chawarin Perdpiriyawong	Won	
Maya TV Awards	2025	Charming Male of the Year	Pruk Panich	Won	
Maya TV Awards	2025	Male Couple of the Year	Pruk Panich and Chawarin Perdpiriyawong	Won	
Maya TV Awards	2025	Best Production Design for a Series	The Next Prince	Won	
Nataraja Awards	2026	Best Supporting Actor Award	Nirut Sirijanya	Nominated	
Nataraja Awards	2026	Best Costume Award	Wiriya Pongkhajorn	Nominated	
Nine Entertain Awards	2026	Couple of the Year	Pruk Panich and Chawarin Perdpiriyawong	Nominated	
Sanook Top of the Year Awards	2025	Best BL Series	The Next Prince	Won	
Sanook Top of the Year Awards	2025	Most Iconic Couple	Pruk Panich and Chawarin Perdpiriyawong	Nominated	
Thailand Box Office Awards	2025	Series of the Year (BL)	The Next Prince	Won	
Thailand Box Office Awards	2025	Couple of the Year (Series)	Pruk Panich and Chawarin Perdpiriyawong	Nominated	
Thailand Box Office Awards	2025	Actor in a Series of the Year	Chawarin Perdpiriyawong	Won	
Thailand Box Office Awards	2025	Original Song in a Series of the Year	"The Sky Beside You"	Won	
Thailand Social Awards	2026	Best Content Performance on Social Media – Series	The Next Prince	Won	
Thailand Social Awards	2026	Best Entertainment Figures Performance on Social Media – Actor	Chawarin Perdpiriyawong	Won	
Thailand Y Content Awards	2025	Best Production Design	The Next Prince	Won	
Thailand Y Content Awards	2025	Best Costume Design	The Next Prince	Won	
Thailand Y Content Awards	2025	Best On-screen Couple	Pruk Panich and Chawarin Perdpiriyawong	Won	
Thailand Y Content Awards	2025	Best Supporting Actor	Nirut Sirijanya	Nominated	
The Viral Hits Awards	2025	Best BL Series of the Year	The Next Prince	Nominated	
The Viral Hits Awards	2025	Best Newcomer of the Year	Charintip Rungthanakiat	Nominated	
The Viral Hits Awards	2025	Best BL Couple of the Year	Pruk Panich and Chawarin Perdpiriyawong	Nominated	
The Viral Hits Awards	2025	Best BL Actor of the Year	Pruk Panich	Nominated	
The Viral Hits Thailand Spotlight Awards	2025	Best Series	The Next Prince	Won	
Y Entertain Awards	2025	Best Creative Team of the Year	The Next Prince	Nominated	
Y Entertain Awards	2025	Prince of Boys' Love	Chawarin Perdpiriyawong	Nominated	
Y Entertain Awards	2025	Y Couple of the Year	Pruk Panich and Chawarin Perdpiriyawong	Nominated	
Y Entertain Awards	2025	Y Star on Spotlight of The Year	Thanakrit Chiamchunya	Nominated	
Y Entertain Awards	2025	Best Series OST. of the Year	"Above"	Nominated	
Y Universe Awards	2024	The Best Coming Soon	The Next Prince	Won	
Y Universe Awards	2024	Best Noticeable	The Next Prince	Nominated	
Y Universe Awards	2025	The Best Series	The Next Prince	Nominated	
Y Universe Awards	2025	The Best BL Series	The Next Prince	Nominated	
Y Universe Awards	2025	The Best Y Series	The Next Prince	Nominated	
Y Universe Awards	2025	The Best Cinematography	The Next Prince	Nominated	
Y Universe Awards	2025	The Best Costume Design	The Next Prince	Won	
Y Universe Awards	2025	The Best Editing	The Next Prince	Nominated	
Y Universe Awards	2025	The Best Production	The Next Prince	Won	
Y Universe Awards	2025	The Best Special Effects	The Next Prince	Nominated	
Y Universe Awards	2025	The Best Series Director	Aoftionz Kittipat Champa	Nominated	
Y Universe Awards	2025	The Best Couple	Pruk Panich and Chawarin Perdpiriyawong	Nominated	
Y Universe Awards	2025	The Best Partner	Pruk Panich and Chawarin Perdpiriyawong	Nominated	
Y Universe Awards	2025	The Best Leading Role	Pruk Panich	Nominated	
Y Universe Awards	2025	The Best Leading Role	Chawarin Perdpiriyawong	Nominated	
Y Universe Awards	2025	The Best Leading Actor/Actress	Chawarin Perdpiriyawong	Won	
Y Universe Awards	2025	The Best Series OST.	"Above"	Nominated	
Y Universe Awards	2025	The Best Cuties	Chawarin Perdpiriyawong	Nominated	
Y Universe Awards	2025	Y Iconic Star	Chawarin Perdpiriyawong	Nominated	
