= After Sundown (2023 film) =

Thai horror romance film

- Theatrical release poster
- Thai: ดับแสงรวี
- Directed by: Bhandit Thongdee
- Screenplay by: Wanna Kortanyawat; Wannapa Lerkultanon; Thidaporn Pruksamasvong
- Based on: ดับแสงรวี by CEO
- Produced by: Chawthip Natcharern; Tidarat Laepeth (Exec.); Kittipat Champa (Exec.)
- Starring: Pruk Panich; Chawarin Perdpiriyawong
- Cinematography: Pongchaiphat Sethanand; Krittavit Damrongruk; Thanawat Kongthong
- Edited by: Poramin Phimthep
- Music by: Franz Komsan Vor; Kongyot Vongvigkorn; Tossaphol Sangsuwan
- Production companies: Very Great Company Limited; Mandee Work Company
- Release date: 20 July 2023
- Running time: 106 minutes
- Country: Thailand
- Language: Thai

After Sundown (Thai: ดับแสงรวี, RTGS: Dap Saengrawi; lit. 'Put Off the Sunlight') is a 2023 Thai horror romance film directed by Bhandit Thongdee, starring Pruk Panich (Zee) and Chawarin Perdpiriyawong (NuNew). It is an adaptation of CEO's novel of the same name.

== Plot ==
In 1961 Thailand, 21-year-old Saengrawi is sent to live at Sitthikornkan's in Phra Nakhon. The young master of the family, Phraphloeng, is living abroad, but he returns home when a sage predicts that, if he doesn't find his soulmate before turning twenty-five, he will be in danger; therefore, Phraphloeng and Saengrawi are persuaded to bind their destinies. In the meantime, Saengrawi is haunted by a ghost.

== Cast ==
- Pruk Panich as Phraphloeng Sitthikornkan
  - Suriyawit Thanomchaisanit as child Phraphloeng
- Chawarin Perdpiriyawong as Saengrawi Raemsawang
  - Sasit Chatpiroonpun as child Saengrawi
- Krittanai Asanprakit as Kraiphop
- Napatsakorn Pingmuang as Phutson
- Anyarin Terathananpat as Kannika
- Jirawat Vachirasarunpatra as Luang Lung Janthakorn
  - Rueangrit Siriphanit as young Janthakorn
- Surasak Chaiyaat as Pharit Sitthikornkan, Phraphloeng's grandfather
  - Napat Injaieua as young Pharit
- Adisorn Athagrisna as Phachara, Phraphloeng's father
- Meenay Jutai as Pimphira, Phraphloeng's mother
- Pernnueng Wongphudon as sage Lee
- Parinya Angsanan as Danai

== Production and release ==
The production of After Sundown was announced on March 17, 2023, with Pruk Panich and Chawarin Perdpiriyawong set to star as the two main characters in their first film and third collaboration after the TV series Cutie Pie and Cutie Pie 2 You. Filming started after a blessing ceremony held on March 30, 2023.

The first teaser video and poster were released on May 28, 2023, followed by the official trailer on June 15.

The movie premiered at Infinity City Hall in Siam Paragon on July 18, 2023 and was released nationwide on July 20 in Major Cineplex theaters. It was also screened in Paris on September 3 during a dedicated fan meeting. On January 11, 2024, it was made available on Netflix Thailand. In Japan, it was broadcast on Nippon TV Plus on January 19.

It was screened at Thailand International LGBTQ+ Film and TV Festival (TILFF) on September 8, 2024.

== Soundtrack ==
A first song, titled "Destiny" (แสงรวี), was released on June 23, 2023, and it's sang by Panich and Perdpiriyawong. On August 3, 2023, Gun Napat released the second single included in the movie soundtrack, "Moon" (ดวงจันทร์).

== Box office ==
The movie grossed between 4.25 and 6.9 million baht in its opening weekend (July 20–23), ranking fourth at the box office.

In Taiwan, After Sundown was the sixth most popular Thai movie in 2023 and earned the equivalent of 597,000 baht.

== Critical reception ==
Sanook.com gave the movie a score of 8.5 out of 10, writing "Bhandit Thongdee made the film good in terms of images, scenes, and performances throughout the 106 minutes of the story." It also highlighted how the two songs of the soundtrack helped to enhance "the perfection of the performance," allowing viewers to follow along. On the other hand, Thanaphat Khamluekian of The Standard felt that the story of an arranged marriage between two people bound by fate had a Thai drama vibe, which, mixed with other clichéd characteristics of the genre, decreased its charm; he deemed the conflict non-existent, and concluded that After Sundown was "no different from the formulaic Thai dramas that we have often seen on television in the past." On the two main leads performances, Khamluekian found that the weak script and its many disconnected scenes didn't allow them to show their potential; he also pointed out the weird use of music, but praised the "beautiful and touching soundtrack."

== Accolades ==
Name of the award ceremony, year presented, category, nominee of the award, and the result of the nomination
Award	Year	Category	Nominee/work	Result	Ref.
Maya TV Awards	2024	Original Soundtrack of the Year	"Destiny"	Won	
Mint Awards	2024	Rookie of the Year (Actor)	Napatsakorn Pingmuang	Nominated	
Sanook Top of the Year Awards	2023	Best Movie of the Year	After Sundown	Nominated	
Suphannahong National Film Awards	2024	Most Popular Thai Film	After Sundown	Nominated	
Thailand Box Office Movie Awards	2023	Actor of the Year	Pruk Panich	Nominated	
Thailand Box Office Movie Awards	2023	Actor of the Year	Chawarin Perdpiriyawong	Nominated	
Thailand Social Awards	2024	Best Content Performance on Social Media - Thai Movie	After Sundown	Nominated	
Thailand Social Awards	2024	Best Creator Performance on Social Media - Actor & Actress	Pruk Panich	Nominated	
Thailand Social Awards	2024	Best Creator Performance on Social Media - Actor & Actress	Chawarin Perdpiriyawong	Won	
