= Napat Injaiuea =

Thai singer-songwriter, actor, and writer

- นภัทร อินทร์ใจเอื้อ
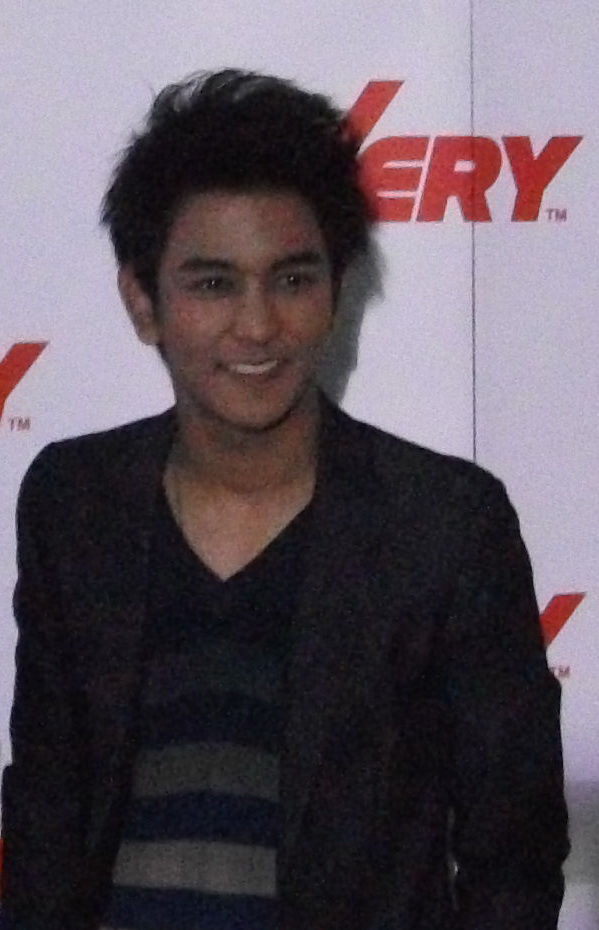
- Born: Chanin Injaiuea; 23 October 1990 (age 35); Suphan Buri, Thailand
- Other name: Gun
- Education: Kasetsart University (BEcon)
- Occupations: Singer-songwriter; actor
- Years active: 2010–present
- Height: 174 cm (5 ft 8 1/2 in)
- Website: Napat Injaiuea on Instagram

Napat Injaiuea (Thai: นภัทร อินทร์ใจเอื้อ, nicknamed Gun; born 23 October 1990) is a Thai singer-songwriter, actor, writer and the winner of the sixth season of reality talent show, The Star 6.

== Early life and education ==
Injaiuea was born Chanin Injaiuea (ชนินทร์ อินทร์ใจเอื้อ) on 23 October 1990 in Suphan Buri province, Thailand, as the middle child. He attended the Suankularb Wittayalai School, and graduated with a bachelor's degree from Kasetsart University.

== Career ==
Injaiuea debuted after winning a Thai singing competition, The Star 6, whereupon he adopted the stage name "Naphat" (นภัทร). His entertainment career spans around music, acting, and hosting.

== Filmography ==
=== Television ===
| Year | Title | Role | Channel |
|---|---|---|---|
| 2011 | Ruean Phae (เรือนแพ) | Rin | Channel 5 |
| 2013 | Koo Gum (คู่กรรม 2013) | Wanas | Channel 5 |
| 2015 | Ban Lang Mek (บัลลังก์เมฆ) | Prok Rupramarn | One 31 |
| 2016 | We Were Born in the 9th Reign Series | | One 31 |
| 2019 | Luk Krung (ลูกกรุง) | Rawin | One 31 |
| 2021 | Phu Yai San Kamnan Sri (ผู้ใหญ่สันต์ กำนันศรี) | Ong | One 31 |
| 2023 | Microphone Muan Puan Rak (ไมโครโฟนม่วนป่วนรัก) | Satit | |
| 2024 | Mon Rak Mae Klong (มนต์รักแม่กลอง) | Tui/Sanya | |

=== TV sitcoms ===
| Year | Title | Role | Channel |
|---|---|---|---|
| 2012 | Luk Phi Luk Nong (ลูกพี่ลูกน้อง) | Punn | Modernine TV |
| 2014 | The Dominant Man (ยีนเด่น) | | One 31 |

=== BL Series ===
| Year | Title | Role | Partner |
|---|---|---|---|
| 2025 | Last Meal Universe (อาหารมื้อสุดท้ายก่อนโลกกลายเป็นทางด่วนอวกาศ) | Chondan | Ritz Rueangrit Siripanit (Role : Chun) |

=== Movies ===
| Year | Title | Role |
|---|---|---|
| 2023 | After Sundown (ดับแสงรวี) | Parit (Teenager) |
| 2026 | King Kaew (กิ่งแก้ว) | Hem |

=== Television programs ===
| Year | Title | Channel |
|---|---|---|
| 2015-2018 | 4 โพดำ | One 31 |
| 2019-present | The Golden Song เวทีเพลงเพราะ | One 31 |
| 2021 | สปอร์ตปังปัง | One 31 |

=== Musicals ===
| Year | Title | With |
|---|---|---|
| 2011 | Four Reigns the Musical (สี่แผ่นดิน เดอะมิวสิคัล) | Pimdao Panichsamai |
| 2012 | Miss Saigon (มิสไซง่อน) | |
| 2014 | Four Reigns the Musical (สี่แผ่นดิน เดอะมิวสิคัล) | |
| 2016 | Lom Hai Jai The Musical (ลมหายใจ เดอะมิวสิคัล) | Nuengthida Sophon |

== Discography ==
=== Studio albums ===
| Year | Album title |
|---|---|
| 2010 | กันเอง |

=== Other albums ===
| Year | Album title | Notes |
|---|---|---|
| 2013 | MEN IN LOVE | Compilations with Phakin Khamwilaisak & Rueangrit Siriphanit |
| 2015 | 4 โพดำ | Compilations with Wichayanee Pearklin, Jaruwat Cheawaram & Warawut Poyim |
| 2015 | Series Love Song By กัน นภัทร - แก้ม วิชญาณี | Compilations with Wichayanee Pearklin |

=== Soundtracks ===
| Year | Song title | Notes |
|---|---|---|
| 2011 | เรือนแพ | Ruean Phae OST |
| 2011 | ข้าง ๆ หัวใจ | Ruean Phae OST |
| 2011 | วันเพ็ญ | Ruean Phae OST |
| 2011 | รอยรักรอยเล็บ | Ruean Phae OST |
| 2011 | รักเอย | Ruean Phae OST |
| 2011 | น้ำตาแสงใต้ | Ruean Phae OST |
| 2011 | อาลัยรัก | Ruean Phae OST |
| 2011 | โลกนี้คือละคร | Ruean Phae OST |
| 2011 | นกขมิ้น | Ruean Phae OST |
| 2011 | วันเพ็ญ | Ruean Phae OST |
| 2012 | ลูกพี่ลูกน้อง... | Luk Phi Luk Nong OST |
| 2013 | รักเธอนิรันดร์ | Buang Wan Waan OST |
| 2013 | คำสัญญา | Koo Gum OST |
| 2013 | รักแท้อยู่เหนือกาลเวลา | Suphapburut Juthathep Khun Chai Rachanon OST |
| 2013 | อยู่เพื่อรัก | Jaopayu OST |
| 2016 | คนที่ไม่คู่ควร | Puer Tur OST |
| 2016 | เพื่อเธอ | Puer Tur OST |
| 2017 | หัวใจรอคำว่ารัก | Rak Nakara OST |
| 2017 | ใกล้ชิดแพ้คิดถึง | My Dear Loser OST |
| rowspan="3" 2018 | เธอเป็นของเขา | Sai Ruk Sai Sawaat OST |
| Sticker | LOVEiS Entertainment | |
| ประกาศ (I want you for Christmas) | LOVEiS Entertainment | |
| 2019 | กอด | Thong Ek Mhorya Tha Chalong OST |
| 2019 | รักไม่รู้ดับ | Luk Krung OST |
| 2019 | เป็นไปไม่ได้ | Luk Krung OST |
| 2019 | หนาวเนื้อ | Luk Krung OST |
| 2019 | ทำบุญด้วยอะไร | Luk Krung OST |
| 2019 | ความรักไม่รู้จบ | Luk Krung OST |
| 2019 | พรหมลิขิต | Luk Krung OST |
| 2019 | ทาสเทวี | Luk Krung OST |
| 2020 | รักไม่มีวันตาย | Leh Bunpakarn OST |
| 2021 | คิดอะไรอยู่ | Poo Yai San Gamnan See OST |
| 2021 | นิทานพันดาว | A Tale of Thousand Stars OST |
| 2021 | ไม่ได้อยากลืม | LOVEiS Entertainment |
| 2022 | ตลอดไปของฉันจะเป็นของเธอ | LOVEiS Entertainment |
| 2022 | หมดทางไป | LOVEiS |
| 2023 | ดวงจันทร์ | After Sundown OST |
| 2023 | คนขี้เหงา (Home Alone) Ft. Krist Perawat | LOVEiS Entertainment |
| 2023 | ฝันที่แปลว่าเธอ | ไมโครโฟนม่วนป่วนรัก OST |
| 2023 | เคียงขวัญ | พรหมลิขิต OST |
