= Chawarin Perdpiriyawong =

Thai actor, singer and host (born 2001)

- ชวรินทร์ เพริศพิริยะวงศ์
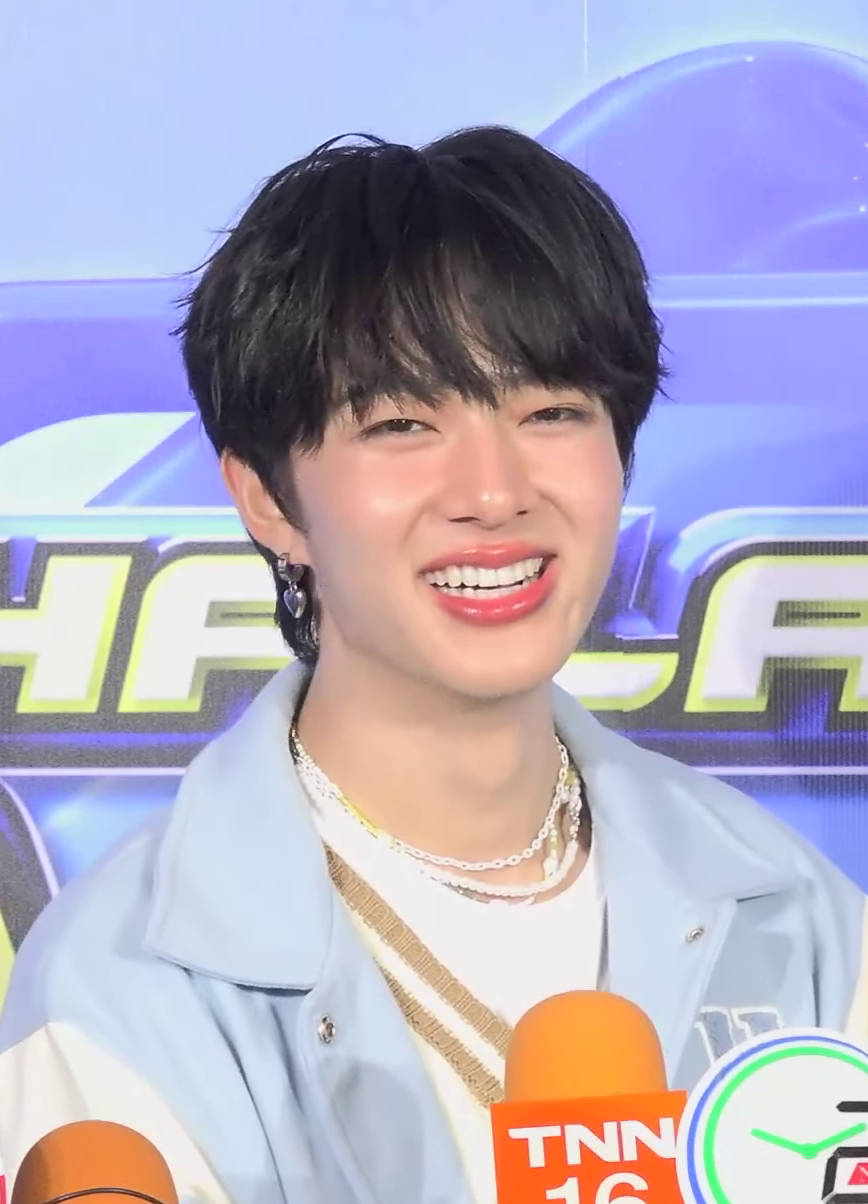
- Perdpiriyawong in May 2024
- Born: 25 July 2001 (age 25); Bangkok, Thailand
- Other name: NuNew
- Education: Kasetsart University (B.A.)
- Occupations: Actor, singer, host
- Years active: 2022–present
- Agent: Domundi
- Musical career
- Instruments: Vocals
- Years active: 2022–present
- Labels: DMD Music, Sony Music, The Orchard

Chawarin Perdpiriyawong (Thai: ชวรินทร์ เพริศพิริยะวงศ์, born 25 July 2001), nicknamed NuNew (Thai: นุนิว), is a Thai actor, singer, and host.

He made his acting debut in 2022 in the TV series Cutie Pie, achieving fame and being nicknamed "Son of the Nation" and "Pearl of Asia".

== Early life and education ==
Perdpiriyawong was born in Lat Krabang district, Bangkok, and is of Chinese descent. Due to their parents' jobs, he and his older brother grew up with their grandparents. On 12 October 2023, he graduated with a bachelor's degree in Chinese language from the Faculty of Humanities of Kasetsart University in Bangkok. He later received the Outstanding Alumni Award from the university for his support to philanthropic initiatives.

== Career ==
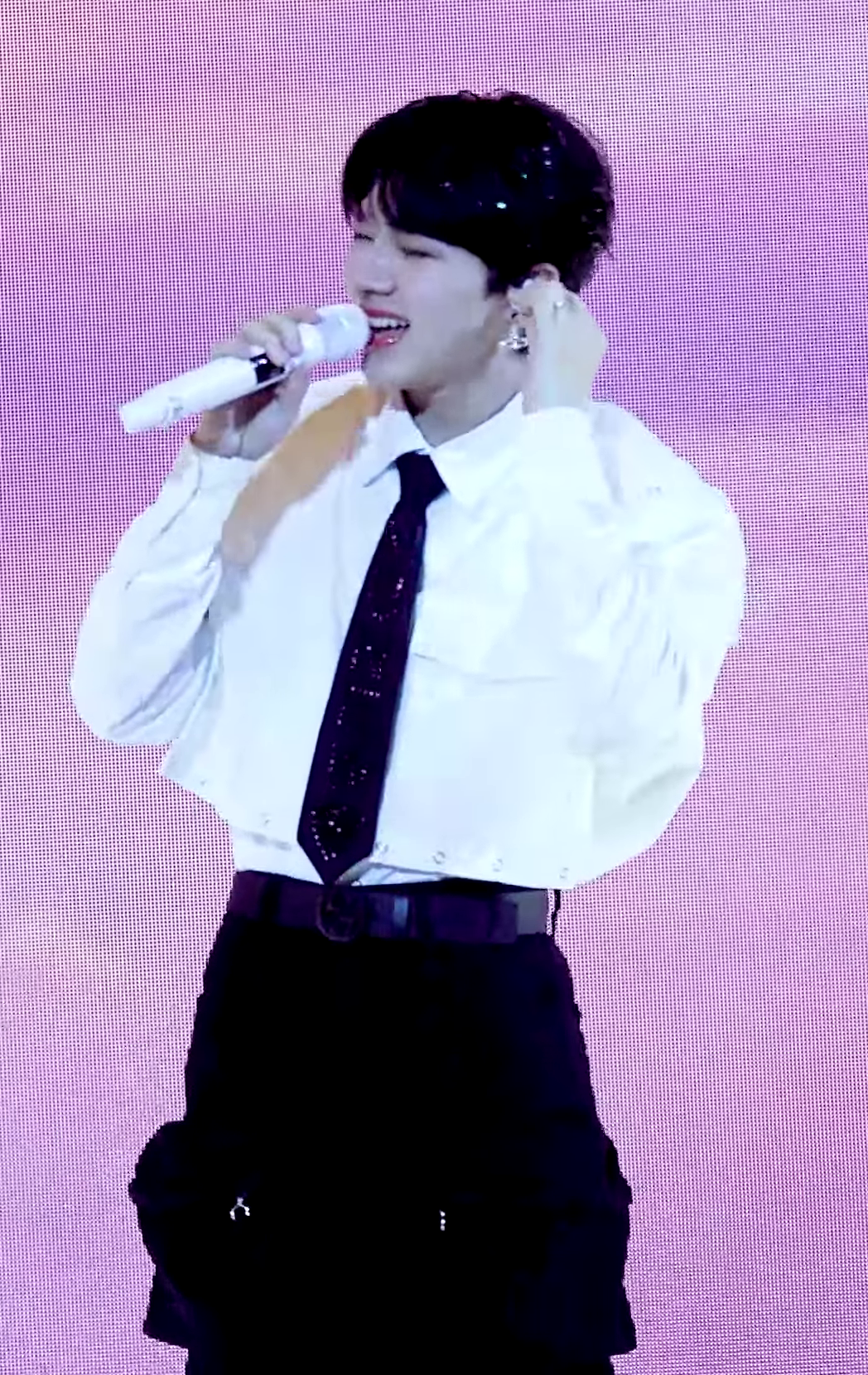
Perdpiriyawong performing "Anything" on 12 July 2023

Perdpiriyawong was first contacted through Facebook by a manager who asked him if he wanted to work in the entertainment industry. Although he had never been interested in it, he asked his parents for advice and decided to give it a try. When a subsequent acting project fell through, he signed with Domundi and starred in the reality-variety show DMD Reality in 2021. He debuted in 2022 in Cutie Pie, playing Kuea Keerati opposite Pruk Panich: the success of the BL romance series shot him to stardom overnight, both in Thailand and abroad, and Howe Magazine included him in the list of the 50 most influential people of the year. He reprised his role in 2023 both in the sequel Cutie Pie 2 You and the spin-off Naughty Babe. In the meantime, Perdpiriyawong starred in the series Mission Fan-Possible and the movie After Sundown.

Aside from acting, Perdpiriyawong pursued a singing career: after lending his voice to the soundtrack of Cutie Pie, in September 2022 he sang "True Love" for the Thai series To Sir, With Love, writing the Chinese lyrics. For his 21st birthday, he held the NuNew Magic Day fanmeet/concert, performing in front of 3,000 fans. In July 2023, he released his first single titled "Anything", ranking 12th on the Billboard Global's World Digital Song Sales Chart. On 30 September and 1 October 2023, Perdpiriyawong and Pruk Panich held a sold-out joint concert at Thunder Dome, Muang Thong Thani: both shows were followed by 4,000 people onsite and over 15,000 online. On 4 and 5 November, he performed at Peck-Aof-Ice InFriendnity Concert as a special guest.

In 2024, he released several singles, including international collaborations like "Blooming Just For You" with South Korean singer Paul Kim and the theme song for Nippon Haku Bangkok festival, "Dream 2024 (Paint the Future)", with Kokoro Kohatsu from the Japanese band Psychic Fever from Exile Tribe. On 10 and 11 August, he held his first concert titled Dream Catcher at the Impact Arena, Muang Thong Thani, selling out more than 20,000 tickets for both days. The concert toured Asia throughout the year and ended in March 2026 with a last stop in Seoul, South Korea.

On 20 November 2024, he released his first Japanese solo single, "First Date at Shibuya", under Sony Music Entertainment Japan, which was followed by a concert on 6 December. The single debuted at #15 on the Oricon Daily Singles Chart of 3 December, rising to #5 the next day.

In 2025, he portrayed prince Khanin in The Next Prince and starred in the musical comedy movie Beauty and the Beat. On 30 September, he debuted in South Korea with the single "Leave Me With Your Love", produced by El Capitxn, which charted at #37 on the Circle Weekly Album Chart. On 31 October and 1 November 2026, he held his second concert, Born to Be NuNew, at the Impact Arena; the single "Born to Be" was released a few days before.

== Filmography ==
=== Film ===
Year	Title	Role	Ref.
2023	After Sundown	"Rawi" Saengrawi Raemsawang	
2025	Beauty and the Beat	Copter	

=== Television series ===
Year	Title	Role	Network	Notes	Ref.
2022	Cutie Pie	Kuea Keerati	Workpoint TV	Main role	
2022	War of Y	Himself	AIS Play	Guest role	
2023	Cutie Pie 2 You	Kuea Keerati	Mandee Channel	Main role	
2023	Naughty Babe	Kuea Keerati	One 31, IQIYI	Supporting role	
2025	The Next Prince	Khanin	One 31, IQIYI	Main role	
2025	Zomvivor	Non	Netflix	Main role	
2026	Mr. Fanboy	Juno	One 31, iQIYI	Supporting role	
2026	The D Dorm	Disney	One 31	Guest role (Ep. 9)	

=== Television shows ===
Year	Title	Role	Ref.
2026	Running Man Thailand	Cast member	

=== Web series ===
Year	Title	Role	Notes	Ref.
2023	Mission Fan-Possible	Nanai	Main role	

=== Hosting ===
Year	Title	Note(s)	Ref.
2024–2025	Thailand Music Countdown	with Mabelz, Daou Pittaya, and MiQuella	

== Discography ==
=== Singles ===
Title	Year	Peak chart positions				Album
Title	Year	JPN	KOR Album	KOR Down.	US World	Album
As lead artist
"Anything" (หมอนอิง)	2023	—	—	—	12	Non-album singles
"Eh!" (เอ๊ะ!) (feat. Tan Lipta)	2023	—	—	—	—	Non-album singles
"Unforgettable" (ขึ้นใจ)	2024	—	—	—	—	Non-album singles
"Magic Moment"	2024	—	—	—	—	Non-album singles
"Your Season" (ฤดูของเธอ)	2024	—	—	—	—	Non-album singles
"First Date at Shibuya" (谷のBARで初めてのデイト)	2024	12	—	—	—	Non-album singles
"First Date at Shibuya (Thai version)"	2024	—	—	—	—	Non-album singles
"Be My Baby (This Christmas)"	2024	—	—	—	—	Non-album singles
"Forever" (จนนิรันดร์)	2025	—	—	—	—	Non-album singles
"Feng Yue" (风月)	2025	—	—	—	—	Non-album singles
"First Date at Shibuya – from The First Take" (谷のBARで初めてのデイト)	2025	—	—	—	—	Non-album singles
"Leave Me With Your Love"	2025	—	37	—	—	Non-album singles
"New Season" (ฤดูใหม่)	2026	—	—	—	—	Non-album singles
"Kata" (คาตา) (feat. Bowkylion)	2026	—	—	—	—	Non-album singles
"Born to Be"	2026	—	—	—	—	Non-album singles
Collaborations
"Tidtidid" (ติดเธอ) (with Zee Pruk)	2023	—	—	—	—	Non-album singles
"Love Feed" (รักเธอเต็มฟีด) (with DMD Boys)	2024	—	—	—	—	Non-album singles
"So Bright Baby" (ปิ๊งไปป่ะ) (with Zee Pruk)	2024	—	—	—	—	Non-album singles
"Blooming Just For You" (꽃이 피는데 필요한 몇 가지) (with Paul Kim)	2024	—	—	27	—	Non-album singles
"Dream 2024 (Paint the Future)" (วาดฝัน 2024 (未来を描いて)) (with Kokoro)	2024	—	—	—	—	Non-album singles
"Sometimes (Special Version)" (ที่คั่นหนังสือ) (with Bowkylion)	2025	—	—	—	—	Non-album singles
"Heartquake" (with Zee Pruk)	2025	—	—	—	—	Non-album singles
"JuBu Jub" (จุ๊บเธอ ) (with DMD Cute Boys)	2026	—	—	—	—	Non-album singles
As featured artist
"Sloth Style" (หนึ่งในมาช้า) (F.Hero feat. NuNew and TXRBO)	2024	—	—	—	—	Non-album singles
"Surrender" (ยอม) (TOR+ Saksit feat. NuNew)	2025	—	—	—	—	Non-album singles
"Pass the Hope Forward" (ส่งต่อความหวัง) (Boyd Kosiyabong feat. NuNew)	2025	—	—	—	—	Non-album singles
"Naughty List" (จดชื่อ) (Butterbear feat. NuNew)	2025	—	—	—	—	Non-album singles
"Wishing Upon the Stars" (เสี่ยงทายใต้แสงดาว) (Paowalee Pornpimon feat. NuNew)	2026	—	—	—	—	Non-album singles
"—" denotes release did not chart.

=== Soundtrack appearances ===
Title	Year	Album
"My Cutie Pie" (ไอ้คนน่ารัก)	2022	Cutie Pie OST
"How You Feel"	2022	Cutie Pie OST
"Be Yours" (ให้ฉันเป็นของเธอ)	2022	Cutie Pie OST
"Will You Still Love Me" (จะรักฉันอยู่ไหม)	2022	Cutie Pie OST
"Baby Boo" (ที่รักที่รัก) (with Zee Pruk)	2022	Cutie Pie OST
"True Love" (รักแท้)	2022	To Sir, With Love OST
"True Love (Chinese Version)" (真爱)	2022	To Sir, With Love OST
"Love is Love" (รักก็รักดิ) (with Zee Pruk)	2023	Cutie Pie 2 You OST
"I Feel Your Love"	2023	Cutie Pie 2 You OST
"It's You" (คือเธอ) (with Zee Pruk)	2023	Cutie Pie 2 You OST
"My Cutie Pie (Inter Version)" (ไอ้คนน่ารัก)	2023	Cutie Pie 2 You OST
"Destiny" (แสงรวี) (with Zee Pruk)	2023	After Sundown OST
"No Matter How Much It Hurts, I Still Love You" (เจ็บแค่ไหนก็ยังรักเธอ)	2023	Love in a Cage OST
"Forget About Us" (กลับไปไม่รู้จักกัน)	2023	Absolute Zero OST
"Time Proves True Love" (กาลเวลาพิสูจน์รักแท้)	2024	Pom Chiwan OST
"Above" (เหนือฟ้า)	2025	The Next Prince OST
"New Dawn"	2025	The Next Prince OST
"I Need Your Love"	2025	The Next Prince OST
"Above (Orchestra Version)" (เหนือฟ้า)	2025	The Next Prince OST
"Takhli" (เหนือฟ้า) (with Thongchai Thongkanthom and Ninew Phetdankaeo as Takhli Gang)	2025	Beauty and the Beat OST
"The Sky Beside You" (ฟ้าที่เคียงเธอ) (with Zee Pruk)	2025	The Next Prince OST
"Still" (ปักใจ)	2026	Love Upon a Time OST
