= Pruk Panich =

Thai actor (born 1992)

- พฤกษ์ พานิช
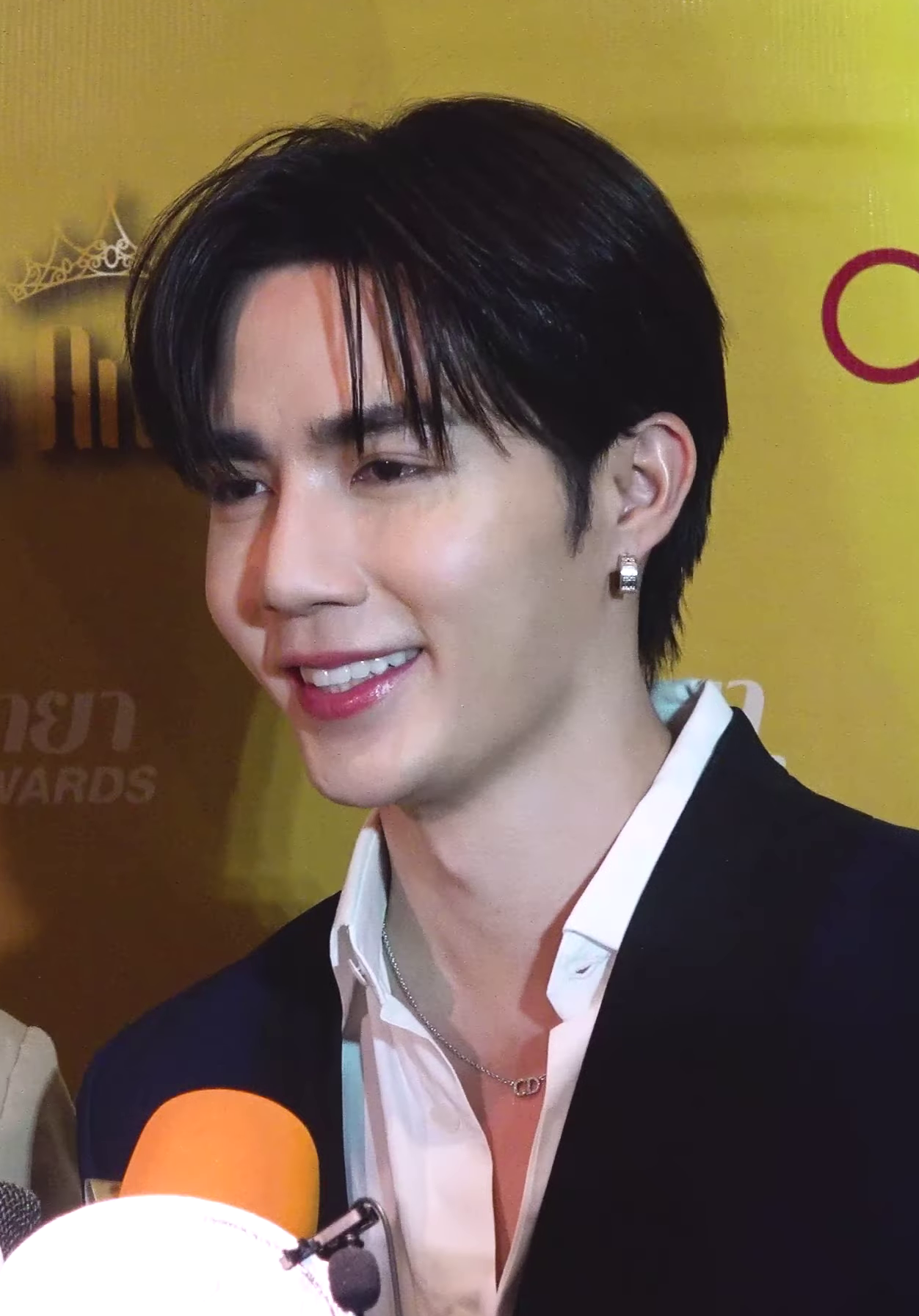
- Pruk in June 2023
- Born: 10 September 1992 (age 34); Chiang Rai, Thailand
- Other names: Zee; Zee Pruk
- Education: Bangkok University (B.Com.Arts)
- Occupation: Actor
- Years active: 2018–present
- Agent: Domundi
- Musical career
- Instruments: Vocals
- Years active: 2022–present
- Label: DMD Music

Pruk Panich (Thai: พฤกษ์ พานิช, born 10 September 1992), nicknamed Zee (Thai: ซี), is a Thai actor.

== Early life and education ==
Panich grew up in Chiang Rai with his two older sisters. After graduating from high school in his hometown, he moved to Bangkok, where he majored in Advertising from the Faculty of Communication Arts of Bangkok University. As a child, he loved traveling and wanted to be a flight attendant or an actor, while in high school he started reading a lot of magazines and dreamed of becoming a model.

== Career ==
Panich entered the entertainment industry through his friend Max Kornthas Rujeerattanavorapan as one of the hosts of the travel program Domundi on YouTube. Later, in December 2018, he starred in the movie Sugar Café. In 2019 he was cast in the main role of Fighter in the TV series Why R U?, which aired the following year. Thanks to Why R U?, he rose to fame, winning the Rising Actor of the Year Award at Kazz Awards in 2021.

In 2022 he was coupled with Chawarin Perdpiriyawong (NuNew) in Cutie Pie, playing businessman Lian Kilen Wang: the success of the BL romance series shot him to stardom overnight, both in Thailand and abroad, and Howe Magazine included him in the list of the 50 most influential people of the year. Between 2022 and 2023, Panich was nominated for several awards for his performance in Cutie Pie, and won Y Actor of the Year at Feed Y Capital Awards, Best Actor of the Year at Kazz Awards, Actor of the Year at Sudsapda Y Awards, Youth Favorite Actor at Thailand Master Youth, and Best Lead Actor at YUniverse Awards. He reprised his role in 2023 both in the sequel Cutie Pie 2 You and the spin-off Naughty Babe. In the meantime, Panich starred in the movie After Sundown, and the TV series One Night Stand and Spice and Spell.

On 1 September 2022, he launched the sweet snack brand ZeeFruit, and on August 8, 2023, his first clothing brand, Super Sun.

In 2025, he portrayed royal guard Charan in The Next Prince.

== Filmography ==
=== Film ===
Year	Title	Role	Notes	Ref.
2018	Sugar Café	Popeye	Supporting role	
2023	After Sundown	"Phloeng" Phraphloeng Sitthikornkan	Main role	

=== Television series ===
Year	Title	Role	Network	Notes	Ref.
2018	Friend Zone	Captain	One 31	Guest role (Ep. 6–7)	
2020	Why R U?	Fighter	Line TV	Main role	
2020	You Never Eat Alone	Mix	AIS Play	Main role	
2021	My Mischievous Fiancée	Atsawin "Win"	Channel 3	Guest role	
2022	Cheating Spouse	Jaegun	Amarin TV	Supporting role	
2022	Cutie Pie	Lian Kilen Wang	Workpoint TV	Main role	
2022	Remember 15	Bew	Viu	Main role	
2022	Club Friday the Series 13: Love & Belief	Leng	One 31	Main role	
2023	Cutie Pie 2 You	Lian Kilen Wang	Mandee Channel	Main role	
2023	One Night Stand	Toy	One 31	Main role	
2023	Naughty Babe	Lian Kilen Wang	One 31, IQIYI	Supporting role	
2023	Spice and Spell	Thos	TrueID	Main role	
2025	The Next Prince	Charan	One 31, iQIYI	Main role	
2025	Zomvivor	San	Netflix	Main role	
2026	Mr. Fanboy	Thee	One 31, iQIYI	Supporting role	
2026	The D Dorm	Dollar	One 31	Main role	

== Discography ==
=== Singles ===
Title	Year	Album
As lead artist
"Nobody" (คนหนึ่งคน)	2022	Non-album singles
"Super Secret"	2024	Non-album singles
"Breaking Heart Station" (สถานีอกหัก)	2025	Non-album singles
Collaborations
"Blank" (เว้นเอาไว้) (with Pete Pol)	2021	Non-album singles
"Anytime, Anywhere" (ทุกที่ทุกเวลา) (with Tommy Sittichok and Nat Natasit)	2021	Non-album singles
"Tidtidid" (ติดเธอ) (with NuNew)	2023	Non-album singles
"Love Feed" (รักเธอเต็มฟีด) (with DMD Boys)	2024	Non-album singles
"So Bright Baby" (ปิ๊งไปป่ะ) (with NuNew)	2024	Non-album singles
"Heartquake" (with NuNew)	2025	Non-album singles
Soundtrack appearances
"You Never Eat Alone" (คนเดียวไม่ได้) (with Peemapol Panichtamrong, Kritsanaphong Sripattiyanon and Nathaphon Buasee)	2020	You Never Eat Alone OST
"Unique" (ไม่เหมือนใคร) (with Peemapol Panichtamrong)	2021	You Never Eat Alone OST
"Chocolate" (with Kacha Nontanun, Tommy Sittichok, Talay, Marksiwat and Boun Noppanut)	2022	Be My Boyfriends 2 OST
"Always You" (ไม่เคยไม่รัก)	2022	Cutie Pie OST
"Love" (ใจรัก)	2022	Cutie Pie OST
"Overtime" (with Kacha Nontanun and Tommy Sittichok)	2022	Be My Boyfriends 2 OST
"IWBYBF" (with Kacha Nontanun, Tommy Sittichok, Talay, Marksiwat and Boun Noppanut)	2022	Be My Boyfriends 2 OST
"Baby Boo" (ที่รักที่รัก) (with NuNew)	2022	Cutie Pie OST
"Love is Love" (รักก็รักดิ) (with NuNew)	2023	Cutie Pie 2 You OST
"It's You" (คือเธอ) (with NuNew)	2023	Cutie Pie 2 You OST
"Destiny" (แสงรวี) (with NuNew)	2023	After Sundown OST
"This One is So Lovely" (คนนี้น่ารักจัง)	2023	Spice and Spell OST
"Continue" (ไปต่อ)	2024	To Be Continued OST
"Our Night"	2025	The Next Prince OST
"The Sky Beside You" (ฟ้าที่เคียงเธอ) (with NuNew)	2025	The Next Prince OST

== Awards and nominations ==
Name of the award ceremony, year presented, category, nominee of the award, and the result of the nomination
Award	Year	Category	Nominee/work	Result	Ref.
Bangkok Pride Awards	2025	Pride Popular of Y Series Star	with Chawarin Perdpiriyawong	Nominated	
Bangkok Pride Awards	2026	Pride Popular of Y Series Star	with Chawarin Perdpiriyawong; The Next Prince	Nominated	
Dailynews Awards	2024	JinFinWer Award	with Chawarin Perdpiriyawong	Nominated	
Feed x Khaosod Awards	2025	Best Couple of the Year	with Chawarin Perdpiriyawong; The Next Prince	Nominated	
Feed Y Capital Awards	2022	Y Actor of the Year Award	Pruk Panich	Won	
Feed Y Capital Awards	2023	Best Couple Award	with Chawarin Perdpiriyawong; Cutie Pie	Nominated	
Heavenly Awards	2022	Best Couple Award	with Chawarin Perdpiriyawong; Cutie Pie	Won	
HOFS Awards	2024	Trending Couple of Social Media Hall of Fame	with Chawarin Perdpiriyawong	Won	
Howe Awards	2022	Best Couple Award	with Chawarin Perdpiriyawong; Cutie Pie	Won	
Howe Awards	2023	Best Couple Award	with Chawarin Perdpiriyawong; Cutie Pie	Nominated	
Howe Awards	2024	Hottest Actor Award	Pruk Panich	Won	
Howe Awards	2024	Best Couple Award	with Chawarin Perdpiriyawong	Nominated	
Howe Awards	2025	50 Influential People	Pruk Panich	Won	
Howe Awards	2025	Hottest Actor Award	Pruk Panich	Nominated	
Howe Awards	2025	Best Couple Award	with Chawarin Perdpiriyawong; The Next Prince	Nominated	
Japan Expo Awards	2026	Popular Star Award	Pruk Panich	Won	
Kazz Awards	2021	Rising Actor of the Year	Pruk Panich	Won	
Kazz Awards	2022	Best Young Man of the Year	Pruk Panich	Won	
Kazz Awards	2022	Hottest Artist	with Chawarin Perdpiriyawong; Cutie Pie	Won	
Kazz Awards	2023	Couple of the Year	with Chawarin Perdpiriyawong; Cutie Pie	Nominated	
Kazz Awards	2023	Best Young Man of the Year	Pruk Panich	Won	
Kazz Awards	2023	The Best Actor of the Year	Pruk Panich	Won	
Kazz Awards	2025	People of the Year	Pruk Panich	Won	
Kazz Awards	2025	Favorite Award Kazz Magazine	with Chawarin Perdpiriyawong	Won	
Kazz Awards	2026	Best Actor of the Year	Pruk Panich	Nominated	
Kazz Awards	2026	Couple of the Year	with Chawarin Perdpiriyawong; The Next Prince	Nominated	
Kom Chad Luek Awards	2023	The Most Popular Y Couple	with Chawarin Perdpiriyawong; Cutie Pie	Won	
Kom Chad Luek Awards	2024	Popular Male Actor	Pruk Panich	Won	
Kom Chad Luek Awards	2024	Popular Screen Couple	with Chawarin Perdpiriyawong	Nominated	
Kom Chad Luek Awards	2025	Popular Thai Pop Singer	Pruk Panich	Nominated	
Kom Chad Luek Awards	2026	Most Popular Thai Pop Singer	Pruk Panich	Nominated	
Kom Chad Luek Awards	2026	Popular Male Actor	Pruk Panich	Nominated	
Kom Chad Luek Awards	2026	Popular BL (Boys' Love) Couples	with Chawarin Perdpiriyawong; The Next Prince	Won	
Line TV Awards	2021	Best Couple	with Suppapong Udomkaewkanjana; Why R U?	Nominated	
Manimekhala Awards	2022	Outstanding Y Couple Award	with Chawarin Perdpiriyawong; Cutie Pie	Won	
Maya Superstar Idol Awards	2026	Popular Male Couple of the Year	with Chawarin Perdpiriyawong; The Next Prince	Won	
Maya Superstar Idol Awards	2026	Best Series Soundtrack of the Year	"The Sky Beside You"	Nominated	
Maya TV Awards	2020	Most Loved Imaginary Celebrity Couple	with Suppapong Udomkaewkanjana; Why R U?	Nominated	
Maya TV Awards	2023	Most Attractive Young Man of the Year Award	Pruk Panich	Won	
Maya TV Awards	2023	Best Couple of the Year Award	with Chawarin Perdpiriyawong; Cutie Pie	Nominated	
Maya TV Awards	2024	Charming Male of the Year	Pruk Panich	Won	
Maya TV Awards	2024	Original Soundtrack of the Year	"Destiny" (After Sundown)	Won	
Maya TV Awards	2024	Couple of the Year	with Chawarin Perdpiriyawong	Nominated	
Maya TV Awards	2025	Charming Male of the Year	Pruk Panich	Won	
Maya TV Awards	2025	Male Couple of the Year	with Chawarin Perdpiriyawong; The Next Prince	Won	
Maya TV Awards	2026	Charming Male of the Year	Pruk Panich	Won	
Maya TV Awards	2026	Popular Vote	Pruk Panich	Nominated	
Maya TV Awards	2026	Male Couple of the Year	with Chawarin Perdpiriyawong	Won	
MChoice & Mint Awards	2023	Best Cover of the Year	with Chawarin Perdpiriyawong	Won	
Mellow Pop	2022	Top Music of the Month (September)	"Baby Boo"	Won	
Nine Entertain Awards	2023	Fan's Favorite	with Chawarin Perdpiriyawong; Cutie Pie	Nominated	
Nine Entertain Awards	2024	Couple of the Year	with Chawarin Perdpiriyawong	Nominated	
Nine Entertain Awards	2025	Couple of the Year	with Chawarin Perdpiriyawong	Nominated	
Nine Entertain Awards	2025	People's Favorite	Pruk Panich	Nominated	
Nine Entertain Awards	2026	Couple of the Year	with Chawarin Perdpiriyawong; The Next Prince	Nominated	
Sanook Top of the Year Awards	2022	Shipped Couple of the Year	with Chawarin Perdpiriyawong; Cutie Pie	Won	
Sanook Top of the Year Awards	2023	Best Couple of the Year	with Chawarin Perdpiriyawong	Nominated	
Sanook Top of the Year Awards	2025	Most Iconic Couple	with Chawarin Perdpiriyawong	Nominated	
Seoul Music Awards	2024	Thai Best Artist Award	with Chawarin Perdpiriyawong	Won	
Sudsapda Y Awards	2022	The Rising Star Duo of the Year	with Chawarin Perdpiriyawong; Cutie Pie	Won	
Sudsapda Y Awards	2022	Actor of the Year	Pruk Panich	Won	
Sudsapda Y Awards	2022	Favorite Social Media Star	Pruk Panich	Nominated	
Superstar Idol Awards	2025	Superstar Male Couple	with Chawarin Perdpiriyawong	Won	
T-Pop of the Year Music Awards	2025	Most Popular Rookie of the Year	Pruk Panich	Won	
Thailand Box Office Awards	2025	Couple of the Year (Series)	with Chawarin Perdpiriyawong; The Next Prince	Nominated	
Thailand Box Office Awards	2025	Original Theme Song of the Year (Series)	"The Sky Beside You" (The Next Prince)	Won	
Thailand Box Office Movie Awards	2023	Actor of the Year	After Sundown	Nominated	
Thailand Headlines Person of the Year Awards	2025	The Most Influential Thai BL Couple	with Chawarin Perdpiriyawong	Won	
Thailand Master Youth	2023	Youth Favorite Actor	Pruk Panich	Won	
Thailand Social Awards	2024	Best Creator Performance on Social Media – Actor & Actress	After Sundown	Nominated	
Thailand Y Content Awards	2025	Best On-screen Couple	with Chawarin Perdpiriyawong; The Next Prince	Won	
Thailand Y Content Awards	2025	Popular Vote	Pruk Panich	Nominated	
The Guitar Mag Awards	2025	New Wave of the Year	Pruk Panich	Nominated	
The Guitar Mag Awards	2025	Star's Single Hits of the Year	"Super Secret"	Nominated	
The Viral Hits Awards	2024	Best BL Series Couple of the Year	with Chawarin Perdpiriyawong	Nominated	
The Viral Hits Awards	2025	Best BL Couple of the Year	with Chawarin Perdpiriyawong; The Next Prince	Nominated	
The Viral Hits Awards	2025	Best BL Actor of the Year	Pruk Panich	Nominated	
Weibo International Entertainment Awards	2026	Artist to Watch of the Year (Overseas)	Pruk Panich	Won	
World Y Awards	2020	Popular Hero	Pruk Panich	Nominated	
World Y Awards	2020	Popular Y Couple	with Suppapong Udomkaewkanjana; Why R U?	Nominated	
YUniverse Awards	2020	Hottest Star of the Yniverse	Pruk Panich	Won	
YUniverse Awards	2020	Sun of the Yniverse	Pruk Panich	Nominated	
YUniverse Awards	2020	Kiss Couple of the Yniverse	with Suppapong Udomkaewkanjana; Why R U?	Nominated	
YUniverse Awards	2022	Best Couple	with Chawarin Perdpiriyawong; Cutie Pie	Nominated	
YUniverse Awards	2022	Best Lead Actor	Pruk Panich	Won	
YUniverse Awards	2022	Sexy Star of Y	Pruk Panich	Won	
YUniverse Awards	2022	Best Couple	with Chawarin Perdpiriyawong; Cutie Pie	Nominated	
YUniverse Awards	2023	Y Iconic Star	Pruk Panich	Won	
YUniverse Awards	2023	Best Partner	with Chawarin Perdpiriyawong; Cutie Pie	Won	
YUniverse Awards	2023	Best Couple	with Chawarin Perdpiriyawong; Cutie Pie	Nominated	
YUniverse Awards	2024	Best Series OST	"Continue" (To Be Continued)	Won	
YUniverse Awards	2025	The Best Couple	with Chawarin Perdpiriyawong; The Next Prince	Nominated	
YUniverse Awards	2025	Best Partner	with Chawarin Perdpiriyawong; The Next Prince	Nominated	
YUniverse Awards	2025	The Best Leading Role	Pruk Panich	Nominated	
Y Entertain Awards	2025	Y Couple of the Year	with Chawarin Perdpiriyawong; The Next Prince	Nominated	
Zoomdara Awards	2020	Best Shipped Couple	with Suppapong Udomkaewkanjana; Why R U?	Won	
Zoomdara Awards	2025	The Hottest Male Couple of the Year	with Chawarin Perdpiriyawong	Won	
