= Cutie Pie (TV series) =

2022 Thai television series

- Promotional poster for the second season
- Also known as: Cutie Pie Series นิ่งเฮียก็หาว่าซื่อ
- Genre: Romance; BL
- Based on: นิ่งเฮียก็หาว่าซื่อ by: BamBam
- Written by: May Piangpaitoon Satrawaha; Ploy Preechaya Prayongsap
- Directed by: Aoftionz Kittipat Champa
- Starring: Pruk Panich (Zee); Chawarin Perdpiriyawong (NuNew)
- Opening theme: "My Cutie Pie (ไอ้คนน่ารัก)" by NuNew
- Country of origin: Thailand
- Original language: Thai
- No. of seasons: 2
- No. of episodes: 16

Production
- Running time: 45–50 minutes
- Production companies: Domundi; Aplan International Group

Original release
- Network: Workpoint TV
- Release: 19 February 2022 – 27 January 2023

Related
- Naughty Babe

Cutie Pie (Thai: นิ่งเฮียก็หาว่าซื่อ) is a 2022 Thai boys' love-romance drama television series starring Pruk Panich and Chawarin Perdpiriyawong. The first season aired from 19 February to 14 May 2022, on Workpoint TV every Saturday at 22:30 (ICT) for 12 episodes. It was followed by a special four-episode second season titled Cutie Pie 2 You (Thai: นิ่งเฮีย 2 You) which aired from 6 January to 27 January 2023.

== Synopsis ==
=== Season one ===
Lian and Kuea have been engaged since childhood because of a promise between their grandparents. Growing up, Lian has become a cold and serious businessman; on the other hand, Kuea is a free-spirited university student who loves motorbikes and music, but he hides his true nature behind a poised facade to please Lian. Unbeknownst to Kuea, Lian is actually aware that his betrothed is not the pleasing doll he pretends to be and that Kuea sings in a bar under the pseudonym of Kirin.

When Kuea finds out Lian doesn't love him back, he declares he wants to break off the engagement and, at that, Lian takes Kuea to his home to live together and try to make him change his mind.

=== Season two ===
After Kuea graduates from university, Lian starts planning their wedding ceremony. In the meantime, Kuea receives an offer to debut as an idol in South Korea.

== Cast and characters ==
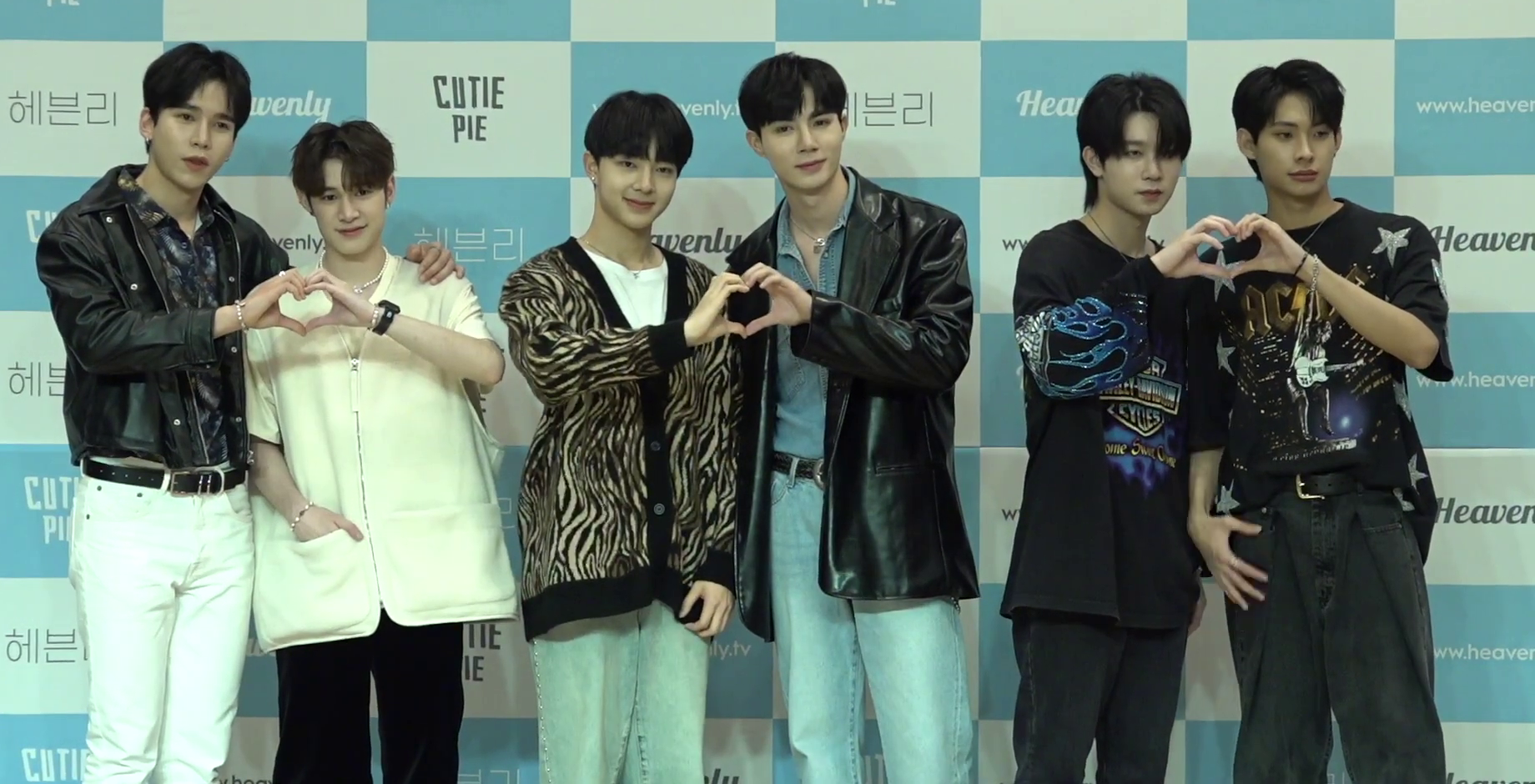
The main cast (L-R): Max, Nat, NuNew, Zee, Yim and Tutor

- Pruk Panich as Lian Kilen Wang, a young businessman of Chinese descent, owner of Kilen company
  - Achita Panyamang as child Lian Kilen Wang
- Chawarin Perdpiriyawong as Kuea Keerati, a university student from an aristocratic family who is majoring in Engineering
- Natasitt Uareksit as Thacha Wongtheerawit "Kondiao", Kuea's best friend
  - Punnathorn Pornprasit as child Kondiao
- Kornthas Rujeerattanavorapan as Phayak Chatdecha Chen "Yi", Lian's best friend
  - Pakapon Tanphanich as child Yi
- Prarinyakorn Kansawa as Syn-Samer "Syn", Kuea's classmate
- Koraphat Lamnoi as Nuer, Kuea's classmate
- Nakhun Screaigh as Jay, owner of Gemini Club
- Ratchapong Anomakiti as Foei, Lian's secretary and driver
- Piamchon Damrongsunthornchai as Ton-Rak "Ton", Kuea's classmate
- Purewarin Kosiriwalanon as Nuchy, Kuea's classmate
- Jirakit Kanjanawaraporn as Pongsatorn "Jab", Kuea's classmate
- Athiwad Sanidwong Na Ayoodthayaa as Auea, Kuea's grandfather
- Paramej Noiam as Auea's partner
- Noppanut Guntachai as Top, Lian's friend
- Warut Chawalitrujiwong as Win, Lian's friend
- Sorntast Buangam as Black, Lian's friend
- Ornvipa Assavanig as Jennie, Lian's business partner
- Poramaporn Jangkamol as Kewarin, Kuea's mother
- Janya Thanasawaangkoun as Ja, Kuea's housekeeper
- Phutharit Prombandal as Cai Wang, Lian's father

== Episodes ==
Series	Episodes	Originally released	
Series	Episodes	First released	Last released
1	12	19 February 2022	14 May 2022
2	4	6 January 2023	27 January 2023

=== Season 1 (2022) ===
No.	Title	Original release date
1	"Episode 1"	19 February 2022
Kuea and Lian have been engaged since they were young, and there are only a couple of years left before Kuea graduates university and they get married. To please his fiancé, whom he loves deeply, Kuea pretends to be polite and well-behaved, and that he is majoring in Computer Engineering, while he is actually studying Automotive Engineering, loves motorbikes and, every Thursday evening, performs at Gemini Club as Kirin, a singer and drummer. When one of their Friday dates is interrupted due to a work mishap, Kuea asks Lian why he has never told him "I love you". Lian replies that their engagement to him is a duty that he promised to Kuea's grandfather, a great benefactor of the Wang family, and that he doesn't love Kuea. Kuea then declares he wants to call off their engagement.
2	"Episode 2"	26 February 2022
Having broken up with Lian, Kuea decides to reveal Kirin's identity during a performance at Gemini Club and finally be himself. After, he gets drunk and is approached by a man, but is saved by Lian, who actually knows about Kuea's double identity and everything that the boy has hidden from him. Kuea doesn't recognize Lian, but thinks he's just someone who looks like his ex-boyfriend. While Lian is taking him home, Kuea asks Lian if he can't love him back and Lian kisses Kuea for the first time.
3	"Episode 3"	5 March 2022
Kuea wakes up in his secret home, the one furnished with the things he likes, unlike his room at the Keerati Mansion, and wonders how he got there. He vaguely remembers kissing a stranger who looked very much like Lian and asks his best friend Kondiao, who was at Gemini Club with him, if he knows anything, but Kondiao had left first. Kuea doesn't dare to ask Lian, but after learning that his boyfriend has been going to the club, he suspects that he knows about Kirin. The next day, back home from university, Kuea finds Lian at Keerati Mansion, and his fiancé announces that from now on Kuea will live with him.
4	"Episode 4"	12 March 2022
Kuea doesn't want to follow Lian, but the latter informs him that he got Kuea's mother's permission so they can get to know each other better; still, Kuea doesn't believe him and calls his mother in Austria to have a confirmation. In the end, he accepts to move in to find out what Lian is trying to do and what his secret plan might be. Kuea subsequently tells Jay he won't be able to perform at Gemini Club for some time.
5	"Episode 5"	19 March 2022
Lian offers Jay to become business partners, thus learning that Kuea has quit singing for the time being. The two work out a ruse to get Kuea to sing again, thus sealing the deal. The next day, even though it's Saturday and his day off, Lian drops Kuea off to the university.
6	"Episode 6"	26 March 2022
After work, Lian picks up Kuea from university. In the evening, Jay calls Kuea telling him that the famous Korean producer Jong-Kook is at Gemini and wants to see him: Kuea tries to sneak out of the house, but fails to evade Lian. Meanwhile, Lian organizes a date to show Kuea that he pays attention to him. The next morning, Kuea offers to help Lian prepare breakfast, but ends up being harshly reprimanded for his carelessness with a knife. The boy bursts into tears because he's always a burden; when he adds that he understands why Lian doesn't love him, Lian shuts him up with a kiss.
7	"Episode 7"	2 April 2022
Lian takes Kuea out on a date at the circuit and then at the supermarket. In the evening they both meet Lian's friends at Pentagon Club, but Kuea suspects Lian is plotting something, as he's unusually nice. Actually, Lian just wants his fiancé to open up to him by letting Kuea into his world first. Lian's friends ask Kuea why he wants to call off their engagement, and Kuea answers it's because Lian doesn't love him. When Lian replies that he has always loved him, Kuea kisses him in front of everyone.
8	"Episode 8"	9 April 2022
Lian and Kuea come back home from Pentagon Club and sort out their misunderstandings. Lian confesses that he was the one who brought Kuea home when he was drunk and that he didn't tell Kuea he loves him because he wanted to prove it through his actions rather than words. They then spend the night together; Kuea, however, thinks it's too good to be true and he's scared of getting hurt.
9	"Episode 9"	23 April 2022
Kuea accidentally finds out that all the land and property deeds of the Keerati family have been transferred to Lian's name, thus making his fiancé the sole owner of everything.
10	"Episode 10"	30 April 2022
Lian asks Kuea to be his boyfriend. Although he accepts, Kuea still has doubts about their relationship if they keep having secrets from each other. In the end, Kuea contacts his mother and asks her if their family is going bankrupt.
11	"Episode 11"	7 May 2022
Since his mother has told him that there is nothing to worry about, Kuea decides to pretend to be clueless, but he eventually confronts Lian, finding out that the silk business of the Keerati family is not going well and that the transfer to Lian is just a temporary move to avoid losing everything to someone else. Lian hasn't told him to not put stress on Kuea. The couple then attends Lian's father's 60th birthday celebrations, during which Lian asks Kuea to marry him, but Kuea rejects him because Lian still doesn't know the real him.
12	"Episode 12"	14 May 2022
Lian chases after Kuea when he leaves the party. At Kuea's secret house he tells him that he knows all about Kuea's true passions and that Kuea doesn't have to pretend to be someone else because Lian loves any version of him; thus, the couple reconciles. The next day, Kuea tells his friends he wants to propose to Lian and asks for their help, but his attempts fail because they are too predictable. In the end, he proposes by singing a song and Lian accepts.

=== Season 2 (2023) ===
No.	Title	Original release date
1	"Yes or No"	6 January 2023
One year has passed. Kuea finishes his internship program and graduates from university, so he and Lian decide it is time for them to get married.
2	"Love or Dream"	13 January 2023
In the middle of the wedding preparations, Kuea is approached by the South Korean entertainment company Cosmixo Entertainment to sign a music deal with them and debut as an idol. Kuea is conflicted about his future and doesn't know how to tell Lian that he wants to seize this opportunity.
3	"Play or Pause"	20 January 2023
Lian accepts Kuea's decision to move to South Korea to follow his dream of becoming a singer. They then attend their bachelor party on the evening before the wedding ceremony.
4	"Finally"	27 January 2023
The ceremony is ruined by a series of unexpected events: the chef is sick, a downpour destroys the outdoor setting, the priest can't make it and Lian's wedding ring goes missing, but, when they finally retrieve the ring and it stops raining, Lian and Kuea get married with Jay as officiant. Some time later, Kuea debuts as Kirin in South Korea.

== Production ==
The production of a live action adaptation of BamBam's best-selling novel titled Cutie Pie was announced on 28 March 2021. The main cast was revealed between May and June 2021, while, in October, a partnership between Mandee Work, Domundi and WeTV was established. The first trailer was published on 21 October 2021. Filming for the first season started on 27 October 27 2021 and ended on 4 April 2022. The second season started shooting on September 22 and finished on 4 November 2022. The trailer was released on 27 December 2022. For his role as singer Kirin, Perdpiriyawong took drum lessons.

== Original soundtrack ==
Cutie Pie didn't release a full soundtrack album; instead, the songs were released as stand-alone singles. The soundtrack was composed by Amp Achariya Dulyapaiboon.

=== Season 1 ===
No.	Title	Artist	Length
1.	"My Cutie Pie" (ไอ้คนน่ารัก)	NuNew	3:42
2.	"How You Feel"	NuNew	3:36
3.	"First Date" (เนื้อเพลง)	Ton Thanasit	3:21
4.	"I Feel Your Love"	Amp Achariya, Aek Sudkhate	3:34
5.	"Alone" (คนเดียว)	Nat Natasit	4:03
6.	"Be Yours" (ให้ฉันเป็นของเธอ)	NuNew	4:43
7.	"Always You" (ไม่เคยไม่รัก)	Zee Pruk	4:13
8.	"Love" (ใจรัก)	Zee Pruk	3:27
9.	"Suddenly" (เป็นไปได้ไหมเธอ)	Tutor	3:49
10.	"Will You Still Love Me" (จะรักฉันอยู่ไหม)	NuNew	3:49
11.	"Baby Boo" (ที่รักที่รัก)	Zee Pruk, NuNew	3:19
Total length:			41:36

=== Season 2 ===
No.	Title	Artist	Length
1.	"Love is Love" (รักก็รักดิ)	Zee Pruk, NuNew	3:17
2.	"It's You" (คือเธอ)	Zee Pruk, NuNew	3:19
3.	"Finally Found"	Amp Achariya	3:36
4.	"I Feel Your Love"	NuNew	3:33
5.	"My Cutie Pie (Inter Version)" (ไอ้คนน่ารัก)	NuNew	3:42
Total length:			17:27

== Reception ==
Cutie Pie generated a phenomenon dubbed by the media as "the Zee-NuNew fever". The series trended at #1 on Twitter every week during its run and was popular both in Thailand and abroad, especially in other Asian countries like South Korea, Japan and China. The total number of views on Mandee YouTube channel, where Cutie Pie was uploaded one hour after broadcast, surpassed 100 millions with episode 8 and 120 millions with episode 10. The series' popularity on social media continued with the second season.

Cutie Pie was appreciated for teaching that love is learning to accept each other as who you are instead of trying to be perfect. It was also praised for its photography, and the concise and modern storytelling. After the first episode, The Standard wrote that Cutie Pie took viewers to explore the life and marriage inequality of gay couples, and that it was an important voice for the LGBTQ+ community.

== Awards and nominations ==
Name of the award ceremony, year presented, category, nominee of the award, and the result of the nomination
Award	Year	Category	Nominee/work	Result	Ref.
Bangkok Pride Awards	2025	Pride Popular of Series/Drama	Cutie Pie	Nominated	
Feed Y Capital Awards	2022	Y Actor of the Year Award	Pruk Panich (Zee)	Won	
Feed Y Capital Awards	2022	Y Actor of the Year Award	Chawarin Perdpiriyawong (NuNew)	Won	
Feed Y Capital Awards	2023	Best Couple Award	Pruk Panich (Zee) and Chawarin Perdpiriyawong (NuNew)	Nominated	
Heavenly Awards	2023	Best Couple Award	Pruk Panich (Zee) and Chawarin Perdpiriyawong (NuNew)	Won	
Howe Awards	2022	Hottest Series Award	Cutie Pie	Won	
Howe Awards	2022	Best Couple Award	Pruk Panich (Zee) and Chawarin Perdpiriyawong (NuNew)	Won	
Howe Awards	2023	Best Couple Award	Pruk Panich (Zee) and Chawarin Perdpiriyawong (NuNew)	Nominated	
Kazz Awards	2022	Kazz Favorite	Cutie Pie	Won	
Kazz Awards	2022	Shining Star of the Year	Chawarin Perdpiriyawong (NuNew)	Won	
Kazz Awards	2022	Best Young Man of the Year	Pruk Panich (Zee)	Won	
Kazz Awards	2022	Hottest Artist	Pruk Panich (Zee) and Chawarin Perdpiriyawong (NuNew)	Won	
Kazz Awards	2023	Series of the Year	Cutie Pie	Nominated	
Kazz Awards	2023	Couple of the Year	Pruk Panich (Zee) and Chawarin Perdpiriyawong (NuNew)	Nominated	
Kazz Awards	2023	Popular Male Artist Award	Chawarin Perdpiriyawong (NuNew)	Won	
Kazz Awards	2023	Popular Male Teenage Award	Chawarin Perdpiriyawong (NuNew)	Won	
Kazz Awards	2023	Best Young Man of the Year	Pruk Panich (Zee)	Won	
Kazz Awards	2023	The Best Actor of the Year	Pruk Panich (Zee)	Won	
Kom Chad Luek Awards	2023	Popular Thai Series	Cutie Pie	Won	
Kom Chad Luek Awards	2023	The Most Popular Y Couple	Pruk Panich (Zee) and Chawarin Perdpiriyawong (NuNew)	Won	
Line Stickers Awards	2022	People's Choice Award	Cutie Pie	Won	
Manimekhala Awards	2022	Outstanding Y Couple Award	Pruk Panich (Zee) and Chawarin Perdpiriyawong (NuNew)	Won	
Manimekhala Awards	2022	Outstanding New Star – Y Series	Chawarin Perdpiriyawong (NuNew)	Won	
Manimekhala Awards	2022	Outstanding Organizer Award – Y Series	Mandee Work Co.	Won	
Maya TV Awards	2023	Male Rising Star of the Year Award	Chawarin Perdpiriyawong (NuNew)	Won	
Maya TV Awards	2023	Most Attractive Young Man of the Year Award	Pruk Panich (Zee)	Won	
Maya TV Awards	2023	Best Couple of the Year Award	Pruk Panich (Zee) and Chawarin Perdpiriyawong (NuNew)	Nominated	
Maya TV Awards	2023	Best Original Soundtrack	"My Cutie Pie" by NuNew	Nominated	
Maya TV Awards	2023	Series of the Year Award	Cutie Pie	Nominated	
Maya TV Awards	2023	Maya Popularity Award	Chawarin Perdpiriyawong (NuNew)	Nominated	
MChoice & Mint Awards	2022	Rookie of the Year	Chawarin Perdpiriyawong (NuNew)	Won	
Mellow Pop	2022	Top Music of the Month (September)	"Baby Boo"	Won	
Nine Entertain Awards	2023	Fan's Favorite	Pruk Panich (Zee) and Chawarin Perdpiriyawong (NuNew)	Nominated	
Sanook Top of the Year Awards	2022	Shippers' Series of the Year	Cutie Pie	Won	
Sanook Top of the Year Awards	2022	Shipped Couple of the Year	Pruk Panich (Zee) and Chawarin Perdpiriyawong (NuNew)	Won	
Sanook Top of the Year Awards	2022	Rising Male Star of the Year	Chawarin Perdpiriyawong (NuNew)	Won	
Sudsapda Y Awards	2022	Y Series of the Year	Cutie Pie	Won	
Sudsapda Y Awards	2022	The Rising Star Duo of the Year	Pruk Panich (Zee) and Chawarin Perdpiriyawong (NuNew)	Won	
Sudsapda Y Awards	2022	Actor of the Year	Pruk Panich (Zee)	Won	
Sudsapda Y Awards	2022	Actor of the Year	Chawarin Perdpiriyawong (NuNew)	Won	
True Insider TV	2022	Best of the Year	Cutie Pie	Won	
YUniverse Awards	2022	Best Y Series	Cutie Pie	Won	
YUniverse Awards	2022	Excellence Award – Best Cast and Producer in a Series	Cutie Pie	Won	
YUniverse Awards	2022	Popular Supporting Characters	Cutie Pie	Won	
YUniverse Awards	2022	Best Kiss Scene	Cutie Pie	Nominated	
YUniverse Awards	2022	Best Couple	Pruk Panich (Zee) and Chawarin Perdpiriyawong (NuNew)	Nominated	
YUniverse Awards	2022	Best Lead Actor	Pruk Panich (Zee)	Won	
YUniverse Awards	2022	Best Lead Actor	Chawarin Perdpiriyawong (NuNew)	Won	
YUniverse Awards	2022	Best Supportive Friend	Ratchapong Anomakiti (Poppy)	Nominated	
YUniverse Awards	2022	Best Supportive Friend	Piamchon Damrongsunthornchai (Tonnam)	Nominated	
YUniverse Awards	2022	Best Cuties	Chawarin Perdpiriyawong (NuNew)	Nominated	
YUniverse Awards	2022	Best Cuties	Natasitt Uareksit (Nat)	Nominated	
YUniverse Awards	2022	Best Cuties	Pharinyakorn Khansawa (Yim)	Nominated	
YUniverse Awards	2022	Best OST for a Y Series	"My Cutie Pie" by NuNew	Won	
YUniverse Awards	2022	Sexy Star of Y	Pruk Panich (Zee)	Won	
YUniverse Awards	2022	Sexy Star of Y	Kornthas Rujeerattanavorapan (Max)	Nominated	
YUniverse Awards	2022	Y Iconic Star	Chawarin Perdpiriyawong (NuNew)	Won	
YUniverse Awards	2022	The Sport Light Special Award	Domundi TV	Won	
YUniverse Awards	2023	Best Y Series	Cutie Pie 2 You	Won	
YUniverse Awards	2023	Best Couple	Pruk Panich (Zee) and Chawarin Perdpiriyawong (NuNew)	Nominated	
YUniverse Awards	2023	Best Leading Role	Chawarin Perdpiriyawong (NuNew)	Nominated	
YUniverse Awards	2023	Best Supportive	Ratchapong Anomakiti (Poppy)	Nominated	
YUniverse Awards	2023	Best Cuties	Chawarin Perdpiriyawong (NuNew)	Won	
YUniverse Awards	2023	Y Iconic Star	Pruk Panich (Zee)	Won	
YUniverse Awards	2023	Y Iconic Star	Chawarin Perdpiriyawong (NuNew)	Nominated	
YUniverse Awards	2023	Best Partner	Pruk Panich (Zee) and Chawarin Perdpiriyawong (NuNew)	Won	
