= Paradise (disambiguation) =

A paradise is a religious concept of an idealized place.

Paradise may also refer to:

== Films and television ==
=== Films ===
- Paradise (1926 film), by Irvin Willat
- Paradise (1928 film), by Denison Clift
- Paradise (1932 film), by Guido Brignone
- Paradise (1953 film), Argentine drama directed by Karl Ritter
- Paradise (1955 film), by Arne Ragneborn
- Paradise (1975 film), by Bill Hughes
- Paradise (1982 film), starring Phoebe Cates and Willie Aames
- Paradise (1984 film), short animation by Ishu Patel
- Paradise (1991 film), by Mary Agnes Donoghue
- Paradise (2011 film), by Panagiotis Fafoutis
- Paradise trilogy by Ulrich Seidl: Paradise: Love (2012), Paradise: Faith (2012), Paradise: Hope (2013)
- Paradise (2013 American film), by Diablo Cody
- Paradise (2013 Mexican film), by Mariana Chenillo
- Paradise (2016 film), by Andrei Konchalovsky
- Paradise (2023 film), Tamil, by Prasanna Vithanage
- Paradise (2023 German film), by Boris Kunz
- Paradise (2026 film), Canadian-French drama by Jérémy Comte
- Paradise, 2004 film by Roger Steinmann
- Paradise, 2025 documentary about Joe Hollis and his botanical Mountain Gardens in Burnsville, North Carolina, US
- The Paradise (film), directed by Srikanth Odela

=== Television ===
==== Series ====
- Paradise (1988 TV series) or Guns of Paradise, US Western
- Paradise (2001 TV series), a Singaporean action drama series
- The Paradise (TV series), 2012–2013 BBC costume drama
- Paradise (2021 TV series), Spanish speculative fiction mystery
- Paradise (2025 TV series), US sci-fi thriller

==== Episodes ====
- "Paradise" (Star Trek: Deep Space Nine), 1994, season 2, episode 15
- "Paradise" (The Outer Limits), 1996, season 2, episode 18
- "Paradise" (Criminal Minds), 2008, season 4, episode 4

== Literature ==
- Paradise (Barthelme novel), 1986
- Paradise (Gurnah novel), 1994
- Paradise (Morrison novel), 1997
- Paradise (Dante), part of the 14th-century Divine Comedy
- Paradyzja or Paradise, by Janusz A. Zajdel, 1984
- Paradise, by Alice Brown, 1913
- Paradise, by Cosmo Hamilton, 1925
- Paradise, by Esther Forbes, 1937
- Paradise, by Koji Suzuki, 1990
- Paradise, by Elena Castedo, 1991
- Paradise, Ohio, fictional place in the I Am Number Four series by Pittacus Lore
- Paradise, Massachusetts, fictional place in the Jesse Stone novels by Robert B. Parker and Michael Brandman
- "Paradise" (essay), by James M. Cain
- Paradise (play), 2021, by Kae Tempest

== Music ==
=== Bands ===
- Paradise (British band), a London Gospel quintet of the early 1980s
- Paradise (Hmong band), a Hmong-American pop band started in 1989
- Paradises (group), a Japanese alternative idol group (2020–2022)

=== Albums ===
- Paradise (A-Reece album), 2016
- Paradise (Billy Lawrence album), 1997
- Paradise (Bob Sinclar album), 1998
- Paradise (By2 album), 2013
- Paradise (Cody Simpson album), 2012
- Paradise (Grover Washington Jr. album), 1979
- Paradise (Inner City album), 1989
- Paradise (John Anderson album), 1996
- Paradise (Judy Collins album), 2010
- Paradise (Kaci Battaglia album), 2001
- Paradise (Kenny G album), 2002
- Paradise (KMFDM album), 2019
- Paradise (Leroy Hutson album), 1982
- Paradise (Lil Suzy album), 1997
- Paradise (My Disco album), 2008
- Paradise (Paint It Black album), 2005
- Paradise (Peabo Bryson album), 1980
- Paradise (Peking Duk album), 2026
- Paradise (Pirates of the Mississippi album), 1995
- Paradise (Ruby Turner album), 1989
- Paradise (Slow Club album), 2011
- Paradise (Stars album), 1977
- Paradise (TQ album), 2008
- Paradise (White Lung album), 2016
- Paradise, by Joy and the Boy, 2001
- Paradises (album), by Ladytron, 2026

=== EPs ===
- Paradise (Anohni EP), 2017
- Paradise (The Insyderz EP), 1998
- Paradise (Lana Del Rey EP), 2012

=== Songs ===
- "Paradise" (1931 song), by Nacio Herb Brown, recorded by many artists
- "Paradise" (Alan Walker, K-391 and Boy in Space song), 2021
- "Paradise" (Bazzi song), 2019
- "Paradise" (Bee Gees song), 1981
- "Paradise" (Benny Benassi and Chris Brown song), 2016
- "Paradise" (Big Sean song), 2014
- "Paradise" (Black song), 1988
- "Paradise" (Change song), 1981
- "Paradise" (Coldplay song), 2011
- "Paradise" (E-Type & Nana Hedin song), 2004
- "Paradise" (George Ezra song), 2018
- "Paradise" (Brandon Flowers song), 2026
- "Paradise" (Hello Venus song), 2016
- "Paradise" (John Prine song), 1971
- "Paradise" (LL Cool J song), 2002, featuring Amerie
- "Paradise" (Meduza song), 2020
- "Paradise" (Ofenbach song), featuring Benjamin Ingrosso, 2018
- "Paradise" (Phoebe Cates song), theme from the film Paradise, 1982
- "Paradise" (Pirates of the Mississippi song), 1995, also recorded by John Anderson
- "Paradise" (Psychic Fever song), 2023
- "Paradise" (Sade song), 1988
- "Paradise" (Styx song), 1997
- "Paradise" (The Temptations song), 1962
- "Paradise (What About Us?)", a 2013 song by Within Temptation featuring Tarja Turunen
- "Paradise", by Alcazar from Casino, 2000
- "Paradise", by Au5 (with Derpcat & HA!L) from Bridges Between, 2023
- "Paradise", by Aztec Camera from Love, 1987
- "Paradise", by Beyond from Second Floor, 1994
- "Paradise", by Bleed from Within from Shrine, 2022
- "Paradise", by the Boo Radleys from Everything's Alright Forever, 1992
- "Paradise", by Boyzone from A Different Beat, 1996
- "Paradise", by Brandon Flowers from Thrasher, 2026
- "Paradise", by Bruce Springsteen from The Rising, 2002
- "Paradise", by BTS from Love Yourself: Tear, 2018
- "Paradise", by Charli XCX, featuring Hannah Diamond, from Vroom Vroom, 2016
- "Paradise", by Chris Brown from Heartbreak on a Full Moon, 2017
- "Paradise", by Diana Ross from Workin' Overtime, 1989
- "Paradise", by DJ Snake from Nomad, 2025
- "Paradise", by Drenchill (feat. Indiiana), 2021
- "Paradise", by Dwight Yoakam from the compilation album Dwight's Used Records, 2004
- "Paradise", by Ellie Goulding from Delirium, 2015
- "Paradise", by Faith Evans from Incomparable, 2014
- "Paradise", by Fergie from the deluxe edition version of The Dutchess, 2006
- "Paradise", by the Insyderz from their Paradise EP, 1998
- "Paradise", by (G)I-dle from I Feel, 2023
- "Paradise", by GFriend from Fever Season, 2019
- "Paradise", by Girls' Generation from Lion Heart, 2015
- "Paradise", by Got7 from Flight Log: Arrival, 2017
- "Paradise", written by Harry Nilsson and Phil Spector and recorded by the Ronettes in 1965 and the Shangri-Las in 1966
- "Paradise", by Iron Savior from Condition Red, 2002
- "Paradise", by Jackie DeShannon from Jackie, 1972
- "Paradise", by Jeremy Camp from Reckless, 2013
- "Paradise", by Jimmy Barnes from Bodyswerve, 1984
- "Paradise", by John Denver from Rocky Mountain High, 1972
- "Paradise", by John Fogerty from The Blue Ridge Rangers Rides Again, 2009
- "Paradise", by Jolin Tsai from J1 Live Concert, 2005
- "Paradise", by Justin Timberlake featuring NSYNC from Everything I Thought It Was, 2024
- "Paradise" by Khalid from Free Spirit, 2019
- "Paradise", by Lil Uzi Vert from Luv Is Rage, 2015
- "Paradise", by Lynn Anderson from All the King's Horses, 1976
- "Paradise", by Magic! from Don't Kill the Magic, 2014
- "Paradise", by McAuley Schenker Group from M.S.G., 1991
- "Paradise", by Meat Puppets from Huevos, 1987
- "Paradise", by Mýa from Sugar & Spice, 2008
- "Paradise", by New Order from Brotherhood, 1986
- "Paradise", by the Rasmus from Dark Matters, 2017
- "Paradise", by Rex Orange County from Bcos U Will Never B Free, 2015
- "Paradise", by the Saints from The Monkey Puzzle, 1981
- "Paradise", by Seventh Wonder from Mercy Falls, 2008
- "Paradise", by the Stranglers from Feline, 1983
- "Paradise", by Stratovarius from Visions, 1997
- "Paradise", by T-Max from the Korean television series Boys Over Flowers, 2009
- "Paradise", by Tesla from The Great Radio Controversy, 1989
- "Paradise", by Timmy T from Time After Time, 1990
- "Paradise", by Tove Lo from Truth Serum, 2014
- "Paradise", by Uriah Heep from Demons and Wizards, 1972
- "Paradise", by Vanessa Carlton from Be Not Nobody, 2002
- "Paradise...", by Vengaboys from The Party Album, 1999
- "Paradise", by Vincent from Lucky Thirteen, 2007
- "Paradise", by Xandria from The Wonders Still Awaiting, 2008
- "Paradise (Not for Me)", by Madonna from Music, 2000
- "Paradise, Paradise", by Toby Fox from Deltarune Chapters 3+4 OST from the video game Deltarune, 2025

== Buildings ==
- Paradise, Low Row, a historic building in England
- Paradise (nightclub), a gay nightclub in Asbury Park, New Jersey, US
- Paradise (Warrenton, Virginia), a historic house

== Populated places ==
=== Australia ===
- Paradise, Queensland, a ghost town, now inundated by Lake Paradise
- Paradise, South Australia, a suburb of Adelaide
- Paradise, Tasmania, a locality in the Kentish Council area
- Paradise, Western Australia, a locality in the Shire of Dardanup

=== Canada ===
- Paradise, Newfoundland and Labrador
- Paradise, Nova Scotia

=== United Kingdom ===
- Paradise, Birmingham, in the West Midlands
- Paradise, Gloucestershire
- Paradise, Tyne and Wear, in North East England

=== United States ===
- Paradise, Arizona
- Paradise, California, an incorporated town in Butte County
- Paradise, a previous name of Shively, California, an unincorporated community
- Paradise, Mono County, California
- Paradise, Florida
- Paradise, Illinois
- Paradise, Indiana
- Paradise, Kansas
- Paradise, Kentucky
- Paradise, Michigan
- Paradise, Missouri
- Paradise, Montana
- Paradise, Nevada
- Paradise, Ohio
- Paradise, Oregon
- Paradise, Pennsylvania
- Paradise, Texas
- Paradise, Utah
- Paradise, Washington
- Paradise, West Virginia
- Paradise Township (disambiguation)
- Paradise, U.S. Virgin Islands

=== Elsewhere ===
- Paradise, Grenada
- Paradise, Guyana
- Paradise, New Zealand
- Paradise, Suriname

== People ==
- Tommy Paradise, American politician

== Sports ==
- Paradise (synchronized skating team), a Russian synchronized skating team
- Paradise FC International, a football club from Grenada
- Celtic Park, also referred to as Paradise, a football stadium in Glasgow, Scotland
- Celtic Park (Belfast) also referred to as Paradise, a former multi-use stadium in Northern Ireland

== Visual arts ==
- Il Paradiso or Paradise (c. 1588), a painting by Tintoretto; reputedly the largest painting ever done on canvas
- Paradise (c. 1620), a painting by Jan Brueghel the Younger

== Other uses ==
- Paradise (cocktail), an IBA official cocktail, made with gin and brandy
- Paradise (surname)
- Paradise (video game), a 2006 computer adventure game

== See also ==
- Carnival Paradise, a 1998 cruise ship owned by Carnival Cruise Lines
- Nexor Paradise, a computer networking project by British company Nexor
- Paradise Beach, a 1993–1994 Australian television series
- Paradise garden, a form of garden
- Paradise Ice Caves, a system of interconnected glacier caves within Mount Rainier's Paradise Glacier in Washington state, US
- Paradise Papers, a set of 13.4 million confidential documents relating to offshore investments, released in 2017
- Paradise Systems, a defunct computer graphics company
- Heaven (disambiguation)
- Paradis (disambiguation)
- Paradiso (disambiguation)
- Rakuen (disambiguation)
- 낙원 (disambiguation)
- 楽園 (disambiguation)
