= Kaci Battaglia =

American singer-songwriter

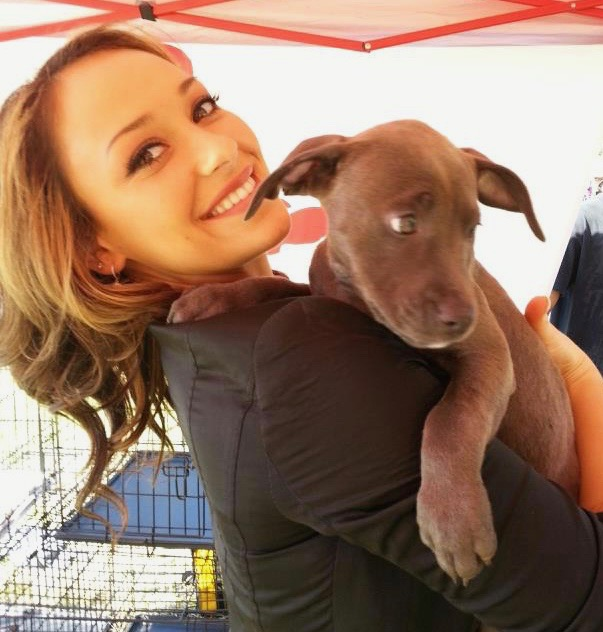
- Kaci Battaglia in 2013

Background information
- Also known as: Kaci Lyn
- Born: Kaci Lyn Battaglia; October 3, 1987 (age 38)
- Origin: Clearwater, Florida, United States
- Genres: Pop, teen pop, Latin pop, dance-pop
- Years active: 2000–2011
- Label: Curb Records
- Website: MySpace page

Kaci Lyn Battaglia (/ˈkeɪsiˌbətæɡˈliːə/ KAY-see-bə-tag-LEE-ə; born October 3, 1987, in Clearwater, Florida), also known as Kaci Lyn and mononymously as Kaci, is an American singer and songwriter. Kaci first gained fame in 2001 with her hit single "Paradise", which reached number 11 on the UK singles chart when she was 13 years old. She also charted in the UK with "Tu Amor" and "I Think I Love You", the latter hitting number 10 in February 2002. Her song "I'm Not Anybody's Girl" saw modest British sales in 2003.

Kaci adopted a sexier style in 2007 and released a dance-pop club single "Can't Help Myself" which hit number 30 on the US Hot Dance Club Play chart in June. She released another club single in 2009: "Crazy Possessive" which topped the US dance chart. Her song "Body Shots", featuring Ludacris, also hit number 1 on the US dance chart, in October 2010.

== Early life ==
Kaci was born in Clearwater, Florida, and raised in nearby Seminole. She began singing at the age of three, and as a young girl she performed on her father's karaoke equipment at clubs in the Tampa Bay area. She was encouraged by her piano-playing grandfather, the former Tampa Tribune publisher Jack Butcher.

As a child, Kaci performed the national anthem at sporting events, and sang at a luncheon for the Florida governor Lawton Chiles. She sang at the Yankee Stadium in New York in front of an audience reported at 80,000 people.

Kaci was in a summer theatre program at Ruth Eckerd Hall. At age nine, she appeared in her first commercial for Walt Disney World, and later had a role in the Disney Christmas video Magical Time in a Magical Place.

From a young age, Kaci knew she wanted to be a singer. She performed at children's summer concerts in City Hall Park. She took voice lessons in Orlando. At age nine, she recorded a Christmas album for her family and friends. At age ten, she recorded A Thousand Stars, an album produced by her mother, Donna, which she later independently released. She was influenced by Judy Garland's versatility, Celine Dion's powerful voice, and Gloria Estefan's Latin music and vocal style.

In late 1998, Kaci appeared in the direct-to-video family film Camp Tanglefoot: It All Adds Up, which was released in 1999. Created by Gregg Russell, the film takes place at a children’s summer camp and incorporates music and moral themes.

In December 1999, Kaci's performance of "I Saw Mommy Kissing Santa Claus" appeared on a local public access television Christmas special produced by Steven "Stefio" Fiorenza. The program had been recorded earlier that year, when she was 11.

== Music career ==
In 1999, Kaci attracted the attention of songwriter and producer Joel Diamond. Kaci recalled performing a LeAnn Rimes song and Shania Twain's "Don't Be Stupid (You Know I Love You)" at Diamond's office. Diamond funded a demo recording of "Paradise", a song first made famous by Phoebe Cates in 1982. Diamond began shopping Kaci's demo to various record labels, attracting music executive Mike Curb. She signed with Curb Records in 2000 at age 12, beginning her professional recording career as Kaci Lyn. Her debut music video was filmed at the Santa Monica Pier in August 2000.

Her debut single "Paradise" was a cover of the theme song of the 1982 film Paradise. The song, co-written by Diamond and L. Russell Brown, was produced by Diamond, with additional production and remixing by Walter Turbitt for Brian Rawling/Rive Droite Music. It was released on February 23, 2001, in Ireland and February 26, 2001, in the United Kingdom where it reached number 11 on the singles chart. In Ireland, the single peaked at number 10 and spent thirteen weeks on the charts. The music video was among the most requested on the Disney Channel and Nickelodeon. The video was also added to MTV UK, where it became a frequent request and reached number 2 on the network’s playlist. Kaci's Latin-flavored second single "Tu Amor", also produced and mixed by Turbitt, was released in the UK in July 2001, peaking at number 24 on the UK Singles Chart. It reached the Top Ten on the pop chart in Japan, where Kaci performed during the same period. Her third single was a cover of Tony Romeo’s "I Think I Love You", which reached number 10 on the UK Singles Chart in February 2002. A follow-up single, "I'm Not Anybody's Girl", was released in 2003 and reached number 55 on the UK Singles Chart. It also reached number 7 on the UK HMV Top 10 singles chart, according to contemporary newspaper listings. The song also appeared on the motion picture soundtrack for View from the Top. The album Paradise was released in the United States under the title I'm Not Anybody's Girl, while it retained the title Paradise in other territories, including Europe and Japan. The song "I'm Not Anybody's Girl" had already appeared on international editions of Paradise before the US album was retitled.

=== Super Bowl XXXV pre-game presentation ===
In January 2001, a special video for Kaci's debut single “Paradise” was produced for the pre-game show of Super Bowl XXXV at Raymond James Stadium in Tampa, Florida. Producer Bob Best proposed the video after he discovered it was too late to include her in the half-time performance featuring Aerosmith and NSYNC. The Super Bowl pre-game segment was filmed in Centro Ybor in Tampa and featured flamenco dancers, reflecting the event’s Central Florida and Latin themes. Kaci sang in both English and Spanish.

=== Japanese releases ===
In 2003, Kaci teamed up with the Japanese photographer Seiichi Nomura to release a photo book titled Kaci: I'm a Singer, published in Japan by Upfront Books / Wani Books on March 28, 2003. Photographs from Nomura were also used in the artwork for a Japanese reissue of Kaci's album Paradise. The reissue added a Dance Man remix of "Paradise", titled "Paradise (mirrorballismix)". It also included a DVD containing Nomura's photographs cycling through a video for "I'm Not Anybody's Girl", along with the music videos for "Paradise", "Tu Amor" and "I Think I Love You".

=== Soundtrack work ===
In 2004 Kaci recorded "Txt Me", written by Leon Cave, which won the BBC Radio 2 "Search for a Songwriter" competition; the song was later issued as a promotional single on Curb Records. Kaci also co-wrote the song "Wrong" with Tiffany Arbuckle Lee and Matt Bronleewe. The song was recorded by Kimberley Locke for her 2004 album One Love.

In 2005, Kaci's recording of "I Will Learn to Love Again", written by Diane Warren, was featured on the soundtrack to the film The Perfect Man.

In 2011, Kaci co-wrote the song "Bless Myself" with Antonina Armato and Tim James. The song was recorded by Lucy Hale for the soundtrack of the film A Cinderella Story: Once Upon a Song.

=== Club singles ===
In 2007, Kaci updated her image with a more worldly, feminine style. She released "Can't Help Myself" through Curb Records. Her later singles "Crazy Possessive" (2009) and "Body Shots" (2010), featuring Ludacris, were included on her album Bring It On and both reached number one on the US Billboard Hot Dance Club Play chart. Bring It On was released digitally on 21 September 2010, with physical editions following in 2011.

In 2024, Curb Records released a digital compilation titled Best of, featuring recordings from Kaci's time with the label.

== Personal life ==
Kaci was raised a Christian. At age 12, she began homeschooling with her mother. Her mother also enrolled her in karate classes as a child, to learn self-defense. In 2002, Kaci wrote that she was working toward her black belt, also taking private instruction from kickboxer Jim Graden, after which she worked as a trainer.

Kaci stepped away from the music industry after 2011. On February 13, 2016, she married Selleck Keene in Clearwater.

== Discography ==
=== Studio albums ===
List of studio albums, with selected chart positions and details
| Title | Album details | Peak chart positions |
| Title | Album details | UK |
|---|---|---|
| A Thousand Stars | Released: 1998; Label: Unknown; Format: CD | — |
| Paradise (Note: Issued in the United States as I'm Not Anybody's Girl.) | Released: June 12, 2001; Label: Curb Records; Format: CD, 2×CD, CD+DVD, cassette, digital download, streaming | 47 |
| Bring It On | Released: September 21, 2010; Label: Curb Records; Format: CD, digital download, streaming | — |
"—" denotes a recording that did not chart or was not released in that territory.

=== Singles ===
| Single | Year | Peak chart positions | | | | Album |
| Single | Year | US Dance | IRL | UK | SCO | Album |
|---|---|---|---|---|---|---|
| "Paradise" | 2001 | 43 | 10 | 11 | 11 | Paradise |
| "Tu Amor" | 2001 | — | — | 24 | 21 | Paradise |
| "I Think I Love You" | 2002 | — | 16 | 10 | 8 | Paradise |
| "I'm Not Anybody's Girl" | 2003 | — | — | 55 | 50 | Paradise |
| "TXT Me" | 2004 | — | — | — | — | Non-album single |
| "I Will Learn to Love Again" | 2005 | — | — | — | — | The Perfect Man (Original Motion Picture Soundtrack) |
| "Can't Help Myself" | 2007 | 30 | — | — | — | Non-album single |
| "Crazy Possessive" | 2009 | 1 | — | — (Note: "Crazy Possessive" did not enter the UK singles chart, but peaked at number 40 on the UK independent singles chart.) | — | Bring It On |
| "Body Shots" (featuring Ludacris) | 2010 | 1 | — | — | — | Bring It On |
"—" denotes a recording that did not chart or was not released in that country.
