= Metropolitan Museum (disambiguation) =

Metropolitan Museum normally refers to the Metropolitan Museum of Art.

Metropolitan Museum may also refer to:

- Metropolitan Museum of Manila
- Metropolitan Museum of Lima
- Fresno Metropolitan Museum of Art and Science
- Hotel Metropolitan Museum, Kentucky, US
- Riverside Metropolitan Museum, the former name of Museum of Riverside, Riverside, California
- Tokyo Metropolitan Teien Art Museum
- Tokyo Metropolitan Museum of Photography, the former name of the Tokyo Photographic Art Museum

== See also ==
- Live at the Metropolitan Museum of Art, a live album by Judy Collins
- Metropolitan Museum of Art Schools, a series of educational programs established by the Metropolitan Museum of Art
