= 楽園 =

楽園, 樂園 or 乐园, meaning "paradise", may refer to:

- "Lakuen", a song by Ken Hirai
- Leyuan Pedigree Ranch (乐园良种场), pedigree ranch in Zhaozhou County, Heilongjiang province, China
- Leyuan Town (乐园镇), town in Zhenjiang District, district of Shaoguan, Guangdong Province, China
- Leyuan Township (乐园乡), township in county-level city of Ruichang, jurisdiction of Jiujiang, Jiangxi province, China
- Nagwon-dong, dong in neighbourhood of Jongno-gu, Seoul, South Korea
- "Paradise" (樂園), song in the live video album J1 Live Concert by Taiwanese singer Jolin Tsai
- "Rakuen" (Do As Infinity song), a single by Do As Infinity 2004
- Ragwon County, county in South Hamgyŏng province, North Korea
- Rakuen (album), a 2004 album by Yui Horie

== See also ==
- Paradise (disambiguation)
- Rakuen (disambiguation)
- 낙원 (disambiguation)
