= Different (Psychic Fever album) =

Studio album by Psychic Fever from Exile Tribe
- Released: July 10, 2026
- Genres: J-pop; R&B; Afrobeats; UK garage; ballad
- Length: 28:49
- Languages: Japanese, English
- Label: 10K Projects

Psychic Fever from Exile Tribe chronology
Psychic File III (2025)	Different (2026)

Singles from Different
- 1. "I Got Ways" Released: 22 May 2026; 2. "Pink Lemonade" Released: 12 June 2026; 3. "If You're Mine" Released: 10 July 2026

Different is the second studio album by Japanese boy band Psychic Fever from Exile Tribe. It was released on 10 July 2026 through 10K Projects and Warner Music Japan, four years after their debut album P.C.F (2022). It was preceded by the singles "I Got Ways" and "Pink Lemonade", with "If You're Mine" released alongside the album as its lead track.

== Background and recording ==
Psychic Fever shared in interviews that performing for different audiences around Asia, the United States and Europe in the years since releasing their first album influenced the group's identity, with the contrasts between the seven members becoming part of the album's concept.

The title refers to the individuality of the members. Tsurugi said the group formerly focused on presenting themselves as a unified act but they had since become more comfortable emphasising their different personalities and influences. Ren similarly described the record as a reflection of the group's growth during the four years following their debut.

The members took a larger role in the album's development than on P.C.F. Jimmy and Weesa contributed lyrics to several songs, while Ryoga said that members had also become increasingly involved in arranging music for their live performances before work on the album began. Weesa said that the group was consulted about the kinds of songs they wanted to record and spent more time recording the album than on their previous work.

== Composition ==
Jimmy named R&B and hip-hop as the group's musical foundation, alongside Afrobeats heavily influencing the new album. Weesa described the record as more personal than the group's earlier material, attributing this to the members' increased creative involvement and greater confidence in their individual musical identities.

The album maintains Psychic Fever's interest in late-1990s and 2000s R&B and hip hop while combining influences from their international activities with the group's existing vocal and performance style.

"If You're Mine" reunited the group with producer Jigg, who had previously worked with them on "Just Like Dat" and "What's Happenin'". Member Jimmy contributed to "Diamond", "Cinderella Pt.2" and both him and Weesa helped co-write "Uh Oh".

== Release and promotion ==
"I Got Ways" was released as the album's first single on 22 May 2026 with its music video, featuring choreography by Kazuki of Shit Kingz. "Pink Lemonade" followed on 12 June, while "If You're Mine" and its music video were released on 10 July with the album as its lead single.

Ahead of release, Psychic Fever promoted the album through media appearances in Japan and Thailand, discussing its production and the influence of the group's earlier activities in Thailand. The group also held a series of album release events for fans around Japan between April and July.

On 2 August, Psychic Fever held a meet-and-greet and listening party in London as part of the album's promotion in the United Kingdom, performing the majority of the album's tracklist for local fans and press.

The group also promoted the album on Japanese television, appearing on programmes including Buzz Rhythm 02 and Ongaku no Hi 2026. On 7 September, they are scheduled to perform "If You're Mine" on TBS's CDTV Live! Live!.

== Commercial performance ==
Different debuted at number 2 on the Oricon Weekly Albums Chart, becoming Psychic Fever's highest-charting studio album alongside P.C.F. It also debuted at number 2 on the Billboard Japan Top Albums Sales chart, selling 42,152 copies during its first week of tracking.

== Track listing ==
No.	Title	Lyrics	Music	Production	Length
1.	"If You're Mine"	ELIONE	JIGG; ELIONE; MI; HIGHERBABY; WILJAM	JIGG	2:43
2.	"Masterpiece"	Nvmbrr; jAngo (UP); Ebenezer	TK (UP); jAngo (UP); Ebenezer	TK (UP)	2:49
3.	"I Got Ways"	Ryan Williamson; Dewain Whitmore; Francisca Hall; Kenya Fujita	Ryan Williamson; Dewain Whitmore; Francisca Hall	Rykeyz	2:51
4.	"Diamond"	LOAR; JIMMY	her0ism; Jonathan Alchibiades Santana; Kyle Matthew Reynolds	her0ism (ever.y inc.); Jonathan Alchibiades Santana	2:21
5.	"Cinderella Pt.2"	JIMMY; Kenya Fujita; Cyprus	HIGHERBABY; Devine Channel; BrownBoyz; Yeji Kim; Ashley Fulton; Nick Vyner; Jack Omstead; Michael Locatelli	HIGHERBABY; Devine Channel; BrownBoyz	2:44
6.	"Into You"	K!-Ki	TK (UP); Hwaji (UP); JASMINE (UP)	TK (UP)	2:59
7.	"Dream Flight"	Kenya Fujita; Carlos Okabe	Kenya Fujita; Toshiya Hosokawa; Carlos Okabe	Toshiya Hosokawa; VivaOla; Kota Matsukawa	3:09
8.	"Uh Oh"	K.Don; JIMMY; WEESA	Taka Perry; Antti Oikarinen; Jordain Johnson; Miles Barker; Hautboi Rich	Taka Perry; Antti Oikarinen	2:52
9.	"Pink Lemonade"	BBY NABE	Aryay; Jack Omstead	Aryay; Jack Omstead	2:32
10.	"Glowing"	aimi	HYMAX; Hongdi; Limzy	HYMAX; Hongdi	3:45
Total length:					28:49
