= Rakuen =

Rakuen (Japanese "paradise" 楽園 らくえん) may refer to:

== Music ==
=== Albums ===
- Rakuen (album), a 2004 album by Yui Horie
- Rakuen, a 2001 album by Laputa

=== Songs ===
- "Rakuen", a 2004 single by Do As Infinity from Need Your Love
- "Rakuen", a 1996 song by The Yellow Monkey
- "Rakuen", a 1999 song by Yuki Uchida
- "Rakuen", a 2012 song by Arashi from Popcorn
- "Rakuen", a 2021 song by Fujifabric

== Video games ==
- Rakuen (video game), a 2017 video game developed by Laura Shigihara

== See also ==
- "Lakuen", a 2000 single by Ken Hirai
- Heaven (disambiguation)
- Paradise (disambiguation)
- 낙원 (disambiguation)
- 楽園 (disambiguation)
