= Body shot =

Body shot(s) may refer to:

== Entertainment ==
- Body Shots (film), a 1999 American film
- "Body Shots" (song), a 2010 song by Kaci Battaglia
- "Body Shots", a song by Chris Brown from his 2014 album X

== Other ==
- Body shot, hitting one's opponent with the ball in the sport of pickleball
- Body shot, a form of food play in which alcohol is consumed from another's body
- Liver shot, a kick, punch or knee strike to the torso
