= Bring It On (Kaci Battaglia album) =

Studio album by Kaci Battaglia
- Released: September 21, 2010 (US)
- Recorded: 2008–2010
- Genres: Pop; dance-pop; electropop; R&B
- Length: 39:00
- Label: Curb Records

Kaci Battaglia chronology
Paradise (2001)	Bring It On (2010)

Singles from Bring It On
- 1. "Crazy Possessive" Released: May 26, 2009; 2. "Body Shots" Released: July 13, 2010

Bring It On is the second and final studio album by American singer Kaci Battaglia. The album was released digitally on September 21, 2010 by Curb Records. Battaglia began working on the album in mid-2009, after the release of her promo single "Can't Help Myself" in 2007. Bring It On marks her first full-length album since I'm Not Anybody's Girl in 2002, due to her hiatus from the music business. The album marks a change in genre for Battaglia, as she transitions from her teen-pop sound to a more mature, dance driven beat.

The album spawned two singles. The first of these, titled "Crazy Possessive" was released on May 26, 2009 for digital download. The single is her first release in the UK since 2002's I'm Not Anybody's Girl. Despite the success of her previous singles in the country, "Crazy Possessive" failed to make an impact on the UK music charts. The single also failed to chart in European countries, however, it did receive major publicity, and has become her breakout hit in that country. Released as her first official single in the US, it was met with moderate success there. Despite criticism due to similarities between it and Britney Spears 2008 song, "Womanizer", it did manage to reach the top of Billboard's Hot Dance Club Play chart in 2009. The second single released from the album was "Body Shots", which features vocals from hip-hop artist Ludacris. The single was released exclusively in the US, where it was met with generally positive reviews. The single has also become a dance hit, reaching the peak of Billboard's Hot Dance Club Play chart, becoming her second consecutive single to do so. Due to disputes between her record label, Bring It On is considered Battaglia's final album after she retired from the music industry in 2013. The album was only released in Japan as a physical release, however it was released digital download in the United States.

== Background ==
After promotion for her 2002 album, I'm Not Anybody's Girl had ended the following year, Battaglia stated she would be working on her next album, slated for a 2004 release. However, at the beginning of that year, Battaglia announced she would be taking an unspecified amount of time off. In this time, Battaglia focused on her personal life as well as her modeling career. She also continued to be a kickboxing instructor. After several years of no singles or albums, Battaglia released "Can't Help Myself" in 2007, and it was serviced as a promotional single to dance radio stations. After the single had minor success, Battaglia announced she would return to the studio and record a new single, however, no album was confirmed at the time.

The outcome of this studio session, titled "Crazy Possessive", was released on May 26, 2009 to generally mixed critical reception. The single did receive some criticism however, due to the single sounding similar to Britney Spears' "Womanizer" (2008). After the single reached number one on Billboard's Hot Dance Club Play, Battaglia and Curb Records reached an agreement to record another album, slated for release in 2010.

After several months of silence, Battaglia finally released a second official single, "Body Shots" and later announced the album's title to be Bring It On. Despite confirmation that the album would be released physically and digitally, it was only released for digital download on September 21, 2010. Due to the failure to release a physical copy, the single failed to garner much success, and didn't even chart in its first week of release.

== Composition ==
The music found on Bring It On is generally a dance-pop sound, filled with electronic backgrounds and auto-tune. The album has been compared to recent releases by Britney Spears, Lady Gaga and Kesha. The dance beat on the album is different than Battaglia's normal teen-pop music heard on her previous albums, Paradise and I'm Not Anybody's Girl. The lyrical content on the album is also more mature, and features Battaglia singing on subjects such as sexuality, love and confidence.

"Crazy Possessive" is the second song on the album, as well as the lead single. The song lyrically speaks of Battaglia's fight for her man, as another woman is trying to take her away from him. The composition of the single has been compared to the number one single by Britney Spears, titled "Womanizer". It had some commercial success, peaking at the top of Billboard's Hot Dance Club Play. "Body Shots" is the third track on the album, as well as the second official single. It was released on July 13, 2010 in the US alone, where it peaked at the top of the Hot Dance Club Play music chart. It features Ludacris rapping in the third verse.

"Remedy" is the seventh song on the album, and differs from the majority of the songs on Bring It On. It features a piano in the song, and although it is an uptempo dance track, it is more pop music than the typical dance music. "PartyAHolic" is the eighth song on the album, and is one of the most praised songs on the album.

== Singles ==
- "Crazy Possessive" was released as the lead single from the album on May 26, 2009. The single was met with a generally positive reception, and has become her breakout hit in Europe and the US. The song sees Battaglia fighting another woman for her man, with whom the other woman is trying to steal. The song's lyrical content and composition is similar to Britney Spears's single "Womanizer". "Crazy Possessive" had some commercial success, where it became her first number single on the US Hot Dance Club Play music chart.
- "Body Shots" was released as the album's second single on July 13, 2010. The single features hip-hop artist Ludacris rapping in the song's third verse. During an interview, Battaglia stated that the single was written after her 21st birthday, in which her friends wanted to try doing body shots on one another. Battaglia hoped to catch that experience in a song, and that's how the song was conceived. The single became another hit for Battaglia, as well as her second consecutive single to top Billboard's Hot Dance Club Play chart.

== Track listing ==
1. "Bionic-Atomic" 3:32 (Kaci Battaglia, Isaac Hayes III, Rob Allen)
2. "Crazy Possessive" 3:36 (Battaglia, Michael Grant, Jarreau Pitts, Arianna Wilson, Trevor Pitts)
3. "Body Shots" (featuring Ludacris) 4:02 (Battaglia, Grant, Pitts, Wilson, Pitts, Christopher Bridges)
4. "Tool" 3:11 (Battaglia, Grant, Pitts, Wilson, Pitts)
5. "Go-Go Dancer" 4:03 (Battaglia, Hayes, Allen)
6. "Captain Save A Ho" 3:39 (Battaglia, Heather James, David Anthony)
7. "Remedy" 3:40 (Battaglia, Grant)
8. "Partyaholic" 2:45 (Battaglia, Grant, Pitts, Wilson, Pitts)
9. "Seeing You Tonight" 4:06 (Battaglia, Michelle Lewis, Jeffrey Franzel)
10. "Watch Me" 3:25 (Battaglia, Anthony Fonseca, Harold Laues)
11. "Bring It On" 3:01 (Battaglia, Valentin)
12. "Crazy Possessive (Seamus Haji Extended Mix)" 6:42
