= Paul Johnson (singer) =

British gospel and soul singer

Paul Johnson is a British gospel and soul singer who released two albums and a series of singles from 1987 through 1990 on CBS Records. He was formerly a member of Paradise before going solo, and later recorded with Mica Paris.

Paul Johnson had been recruited to Paradise when the London Gospel funk group was on a tour of the North of England. At the time Johnson was singing as a member of a Seventh-day Adventist choir, and noted for his high falsetto "in a style not dissimilar to Earth, Wind & Fire's Philip Bailey". He was recruited to share lead vocals with Paradise's Doug Williams and featured on all three of the band's albums. In 1986 Johnson attracted the enthusiastic attention of Paul Weller. His concerts on the London Gospel circuit led to a recording contract and his self-titled first album with CBS. In 1987, he recorded a session for John Peel. His 1989 second album Personal received favourable reviews in the jazz and soul press, but failed to make impact commercially.

== Discography ==
Albums

- Paul Johnson (CBS 4506401) 1987 - UK No. 63
- Personal (CBS 4632841) 1989 - UK No. 70

Singles

- "When Love Comes Calling" 1987 - UK No. 52
- "Half a World Away" 1987 - UK No. 79
- "Are We Strong Enough" 1987
- "Fear of Falling" 1988
- "Burnin'" 1988
- "Every Kinda People" 1988
- "No More Tomorrows" 1989 - UK No. 67
- "Masquerade" 1989 - UK No. 97
- "Don't Make Me Wait Too Long" 1990 - UK No. 95
