= Psychic File I =

EP by Psychic Fever from Exile Tribe
- Released: May 17, 2023
- Genre: J-pop
- Length: 23:07
- Languages: Japanese; English
- Label: LDH

Psychic Fever from Exile Tribe chronology
P.C.F (2022)	Psychic File I (2023)	99.9 Psychic Radio (2024)

Psychic File I is the first mini-album by Psychic Fever from Exile Tribe. It was released on May 17, 2023, by LDH Records.

The album was released in three formats: a limited first press edition with CD + Blu-ray + 24-page lyric photo book, a limited first press edition with CD + DVD + 24-page lyric photo book, and a regular edition with CD only.

The title reflects a "scientific" vibe, with the album incorporating new production methods and sound experimentation inspired by their post-debut activities in Asia, especially in Thailand.

The album consists of seven tracks, featuring the lead song "Baky Baku" with a synth-pop sound, "To the Top" feat. DVI overseen by Thai rapper F.Hero, "Highlights" with elements of Jersey Club, "Asymmetry" offering a mid-tempo alternative R&B style, and "Up and Down" delivering an up-tempo track with a trendy vibe.

In addition, this release includes the songs "ForEVER" and "Nice & Slow", for which members of the group participated in lyric writing for the first time. These tracks are said to express the group's worldview and their feelings toward fans.

Music media outlet Real Sound praised the album as "an ambitious attempt that leverages their experiences in Thailand and the love of music by the seven members", analyzing it as a turning point marking the group's step onto a new stage.

== Background ==
Starting in September 2022, PSYCHIC FEVER spent approximately six months based in Thailand after their debut, engaging in performances and media appearances locally. Inspired by the stimulation they received through these overseas activities, the production of this album, "PSYCHIC FILE I", proceeded, and those influences are reflected in the music.

Moreover, the group's members took on lyric writing for the first time. The song "ForEVER" expresses their gratitude to fans who have supported them since their debut.

== Promotion and performances ==
The lead song "BAKU BAKU" was released in advance on April 10, 2023, along with its music video.

The song was chosen as the ending theme for Fuji TV’s morning program "Mezamashi 8" in April and May.

After the album's release, the group performed "BAKU BAKU" on TBS’s "CDTV Live! Live!" during a special segment titled “Night Fest.”

During their first solo live tour, "PSYCHIC FEVER LIVE TOUR 2023 ‘P.C.F’", which began in June 2023, tracks from this EP were included in the main setlists and performed at each venue.

== Commercial performance ==
Psychic File I debuted at number 3 on the Oricon Weekly Albums Ranking in its first week.

It also ranked third on Billboard Japan's Top Albums Sales chart, selling an estimated 29,401 copies that week.

In the year-end charts, it placed 94th on the Oricon Annual Album Ranking and 93rd on the Billboard Japan Annual Album Sales Chart.

== Track listing ==
Psychic File I track lising
No.	Title	Lyrics	Music	Length
1.	"Baku Baku"	Elione	Softserveboy; Sqvare; Ryan Kim; el ja	3:33
2.	"Highlights"	Elione	Jigg; fiction.	2:45
3.	"Asymmetry" (アシンメトリー)	Elione	Jigg; fiction.	3:14
4.	"Nice & Slow"	Kokoro; Weesa; Tsurugi; Ryoga; Ren; Jimmy; Ryushin; Elione	Gabriel Brandes; Alex Karlsson; Fabian Torsson	3:05
5.	"Up and Down"	彩-xi-	Fast Lane; Rico Greene	3:16
6.	"To the Top" (featuring DVI)	Nino; Ben Bizzy; Prong Praison; Archy; Minymynx; Tamp	Ben Bizzy; Prong Praison; Archy; Minymynx; Tamp	3:24
7.	"ForEVER"	Kokoro; Weesa; Tsurugi; Ryoga; Jimmy; Ren; Elione; Ryushin	Sean Michael Alexander; Sqvare; Softserveboy	3:48
Total length:				23:07
