= Crazy Possessive =

Single by Kaci Battaglia

from the album Bring It On
- Released: May 26, 2009
- Recorded: 2008
- Length: 3:38
- Label: Curb
- Songwriters: Arianna Wilson, Jarreau Pitts, Kaci Battaglia, Michael Grant
- Producers: Michael Grant, Jarreau Pitts and Trevor Pitts

Kaci singles chronology
"I'm Not Anybody's Girl" (2002)	"Crazy Possessive" (2009)	"Body Shots" (2010)

Alternative covers
- Remixes cover

"Crazy Possessive", also known as "Crazy Possessive (I'll Muck You Up)" or "Crazy Possessive (I'll Fuck You Up)", is the first single off Kaci Battaglia's second studio album, Bring It On (2010).

== Release ==
The single "Crazy Possessive" was sent to radio in April, 2009 via iTunes and Amazon.com on May 26, 2009 and has become a huge hit on Sirius Satellite Radio.

It was released in the United Kingdom on May 7, 2010. The song also made an international appearances in Europe as it was shown in many countries across Europe.

== Song information ==
"Crazy Possessive" is moderately fast tempo composed in the key of G minor with 136 beats per minute. The lyrics themselves tell the story of one woman and her battle over "her man" with another woman. It has been posted a Popjustice Song of the Day and on KTU Nation.

== Music video ==
The video premiered at Battaglia's official YouTube page on September 15, 2009. It features her in a motel fighting with her other self.

== Track listing ==
Digital single

1. "Crazy Possessive" (Main Version) - 03:50

Club track

1. "Crazy Possessive" (Radio Edit) - 3:38
2. "Crazy Possessive" (Extended Mix) - 6:20
3. "Crazy Possessive" (Mixshow Edit)

Remixes

1. "Crazy Possessive" (Extended version) - 06:20
2. "Crazy Possessive" (Cahill Club Mix) - 06:02
3. "Crazy Possessive" (Digital Dog Club Mix) - 06:31
4. "Crazy Possessive" (Cahill Dub) - 05:56
5. "Crazy Possessive" (Digital Dog Dub) - 07:34

UK Bundle

1. "Crazy Possessive" (Seamus Haji Radio Edit)
2. "Crazy Possessive" (Cahill Radio Edit) - 3:04
3. "Crazy Possessive" (Almighty Radio Edit)
4. "Crazy Possessive" (Digital Dog Radio Edit) - 3:18
5. "Crazy Possessive" (Radio Edit) 3:38

Other Versions

- "Crazy Possessive" (Seamus Haji Extended) - 6:42

== Radio date and release history ==
Country	Release date	Format	Label
United States	May 26, 2009; August 10, 2009	Digital download Mainstream airplay	Curb Records
United Kingdom	May 10, 2010	Digital download	Curb Records

== Charts ==
=== Weekly charts ===
Chart (2009)	Peak position
UK Indie (Official Charts)	40
US Dance Club Songs (Billboard)	1

=== Year-end charts ===
Chart (2009)	Position
US Dance Club Songs (Billboard)	27
