= Paradise (Phoebe Cates song) =

Theme from the 1982 film Paradise

Single by Phoebe Cates

from the album Paradise
- B-side: "Theme from Paradise" instrumental
- Released: 1982
- Length: 3:53
- Label: Columbia; CBS
- Songwriters: L. Russell Brown; Joel Diamond
- Producers: L. Russell Brown; Joel Diamond

Audio
- "Paradise" on YouTube

"Paradise" (or "Theme from Paradise") is a song written and produced by L. Russell Brown and Joel Diamond that served as the theme to the 1982 adventure romance film Paradise. The theme is sung by American former actress Phoebe Cates and appears on her 1982 album of the same name. It was released as a single the same year and reached number one in Italy. In 2001, American former singer Kaci covered the theme for her first studio album, Paradise (2001), and released it as her debut single the same year. Kaci's version became a hit in the United Kingdom, where it peaked at number 11 on the UK Singles Chart.

== Track listings ==
US 7-inch single

A1. "Intro" – 0:05
A2. "Theme from Paradise – 3:53
B1. "Theme from Paradise (instrumental) – 3:53

International 7-inch single

A. "Theme from Paradise – 3:53
B. "Theme from Paradise (instrumental) – 3:53

== Charts ==
Weekly chart performance for "Paradise"
Chart (1982)	Peak position
Italy (Germano Ruscitto)	1

== Kaci version ==
"Paradise"

Single by Kaci

from the album Paradise
- B-side: "Un Paraiso"; "Seventh Wonder of the World"
- Released: February 23, 2001
- Studio: Buffalo Sound
- Length: 3:34
- Label: Curb; London
- Songwriters: L. Russell Brown; Joel Diamond
- Producer: Joel Diamond

Kaci singles chronology
"Paradise" (2001)	"Tu Amor" (2001)

Audio
- "Paradise" on YouTube

The American singer Kaci recorded a version of the song that was included on her debut album, Paradise. It was released as her debut single on February 23, 2001, in Ireland and on February 26 in the United Kingdom. Kaci was 13 at the time. Her version, produced by Joel Diamond, reached number 11 on the UK Singles Chart and number 43 on the US Billboard Maxi-Singles Sales chart.

=== Chart performance ===
On March 4, 2001, "Paradise" debuted and peaked at number 11 on the UK Singles Chart. It spent nine weeks on the UK chart and was Kaci's highest-charting single until her cover of the Partridge Family's "I Think I Love You" reached number 10 in January 2002. The song ended 2001 as the UK's 124th-best-selling single. In Ireland, the song debuted at number 30 on March 1, 2001, and rose to its peak of number 10 during its fifth week on the chart, staying there for two weeks; it spent 11 weeks within the top 50. On the Eurochart Hot 100, "Paradise" debuted and peaked at number 47 on the issue of March 17, 2001. In the United States, the song appeared on the Billboard Maxi-Singles Sales chart, where it reached number 43 on June 30, 2001.

=== Track listings ===
US CD single

1. "Paradise" (radio edit) – 3:34
2. "Paradise" (Motiv 8 Celestial radio edit) – 3:51
3. "Un Paraiso" (Spanish version) – 4:01

UK CD single

1. "Paradise" (Metro radio edit) – 3:36
2. "Seventh Wonder of the World" (new mix) – 3:53
3. "Paradise" (Motiv 8 Celestial radio edit) – 3:51
4. "Paradise" (video) – 3:49

UK cassette single

1. "Paradise" (Metro radio edit) – 3:36
2. "Seventh Wonder of the World" (new mix) – 3:53

Australian CD single

1. "Paradise" (Metro radio edit)
2. "Seventh Wonder of the World" (new mix)
3. "Paradise" (Motiv 8 Celestial radio edit)
4. "Paradise" (Motiv 8 Celestial club mix)

Japanese mini-CD single

1. "Paradise" (Metro radio edit)
2. "Seventh Wonder of the World" (new mix)
3. "Paradise" (Motiv 8 Celestial radio edit)

=== Credits and personnel ===
Credits are taken from the US CD single liner notes.

Studio

- Recorded at Buffalo Sound

Personnel

- L. Russell Brown – writing
- Joel Diamond – writing, production, mixing, arrangement
- Kaci – vocals
- MonaLisa Young – background vocals, vocal arrangement
- Will Wheaton – background vocals
- Bridgette Bryant – background vocals
- Adam Phillips – guitar
- Ted Perlman – instruments, mixing, arrangement, engineering, programming
- Walter Turbitt – additional production, recording, programming

=== Charts ===
==== Weekly charts ====
Weekly chart performance for "Paradise"
Chart (2001)	Peak position
Europe (Eurochart Hot 100)	47
Ireland (IRMA)	10
Scottish Singles Sales (Official Charts)	11
UK Singles (Official Charts)	11
US Maxi-Singles Sales (Billboard)	43

==== Year-end charts ====
2001 year-end chart performance for "Paradise"
Chart (2001)	Position
Canada (Nielsen SoundScan)	159
Ireland (IRMA)	86
UK Singles (OCC)	124

2002 year-end chart performance for "Paradise"
Chart (2002)	Position
Canada (Nielsen SoundScan)	188

=== Release history ===
Release dates and formats for "Paradise"
Region	Date	Format(s)	Label(s)	Ref.
Ireland	February 23, 2001	—N/a	Curb; London	
United Kingdom	February 26, 2001	CD; cassette	Curb; London	
United States	May 15, 2001	Contemporary hit radio	Curb	
Japan	August 1, 2001	Mini-CD	Curb	
Australia	September 24, 2001	CD	Curb	
