= Paradise (British band) =

London-based gospel quintet

Paradise were a British, London-based gospel quintet of the early 1980s, which were the first UK group to adopt funk elements into their sound after the pioneering style of US gospel acts such as Andrae Crouch and Rance Allen and later added reggae sounds to their music in the 1990s. In 1980 the group were signed to Pilgrim Records, a UK Christian record label whose roster included Marilyn Baker, and set to work in a collegiate style on their self-titled first album. From 1980-1985 the group included two lead singers, Doug Williams and Paul Johnson, noted for his high falsetto. Johnson left to attempt a mainstream solo career with CBS in 1986. Following Johnson's departure the group released one more single then split up.. Many of their hits include "World's Midnight", "Never Will Turn Back", "Here and Now", the smash trio hits "One Mind, Two Hearts", "With You", "Just Can't Stop", "Love Is the Answer"," Back Together", and "We Can Work It Out".

== Discography ==
=== Albums ===
- Paradise (Pilgrim, 1981)
- World's Midnight (1982, Pilgrim)
- Love Is the Answer (1983, Priority)
- Best of Paradise (2010, Kingsway)

=== Singles ===
- "Love Is the Answer" (1983)
- "One Mind, Two Hearts" (1983) (UK#42)
- "We Can Work It Out" (1984) (UK#81)
- "Heartstrings" (1985)
