= Drop Dead Fred =

1991 film by Ate de Jong

- Theatrical release poster
- Directed by: Ate de Jong
- Screenplay by: Carlos Davis; Anthony Fingleton
- Story by: Elizabeth Livingston
- Produced by: Paul Webster
- Starring: Phoebe Cates; Rik Mayall; Marsha Mason; Tim Matheson; Carrie Fisher
- Cinematography: Peter Deming
- Edited by: Marshall Harvey
- Music by: Randy Edelman
- Production companies: PolyGram; Working Title Films
- Distributed by: New Line Cinema (United States); Rank Film Distributors (United Kingdom); Manifesto Film Sales (International)
- Release dates: May 24, 1991 (United States); October 11, 1991 (United Kingdom)
- Running time: 101 minutes
- Countries: United Kingdom; United States
- Language: English
- Budget: $6.7 million (est.) or £3,650,000
- Box office: $24 million

Drop Dead Fred is a 1991 black comedy fantasy film, directed by Ate de Jong, produced by PolyGram and Working Title Films and released and distributed by New Line Cinema. Starring Phoebe Cates and Rik Mayall, with Marsha Mason, Tim Matheson and Carrie Fisher, the film's plot revolves around a young woman who, facing setbacks in her life, finds herself reunited with her childhood imaginary friend who offers to help her overcome her problems in his very distinctive way. The film was a commercial flop on its opening weekend and received generally negative reviews, but went on to become a cult film.

== Plot ==
Elizabeth Cronin, an unassertive, repressed woman who works as a court reporter in Minneapolis, finds that her husband Charles, whom she separated from, wishes to go ahead with a divorce so he can be with Annabella, a woman he met during their separation. After thieves steal her purse and car, causing her to arrive to work late and be fired, Elizabeth runs into her childhood friend Mickey Bunce. Their reunion leads her to recall past memories of her childhood, in which she had an imaginary friend called Drop Dead Fred who involved her in his chaotic adventures and gave her happiness, until she forgot about him.

After a pep talk from another friend, Janie, Elizabeth moves back home with her oppressive mother Polly, who believes that Elizabeth is to blame for Charles cheating on her and leaving her, and Polly urges her to change her appearance to get her husband back. In her old bedroom Elizabeth finds a jack-in-the-box that is sealed shut with tape. Upon removing the tape, she is shocked to find Fred trapped inside, and Fred is disturbed to find how much she has changed since childhood. Learning how unhappy she currently is, Fred offers to help her feel better, which she determines conducive to winning back Charles.

However, his methods cause problems: Elizabeth accidentally sinks Janie's houseboat, she wreaks havoc in a restaurant, and she is tricked into attacking a violinist in a shopping mall. Polly becomes worried over her recent behaviour, and takes Elizabeth to see a psychologist who specializes in children. While in the waiting room, Fred meets with other imaginary friends, who reveals that the psychologist prescribes medication that can kill them. After the visit, Elizabeth, feeling that Fred is not helping and convinced by her mother to believe he is not real, accepts the medication and uses it, slowly killing him.

To prevent himself being lost to her, Fred reminds Elizabeth that Polly was responsible for trapping him in the jack-in-the-box – fed up with the chaos he got Elizabeth to make, she sealed him away, traumatizing her daughter, while leading Elizabeth's father Nigel, who felt that Fred was needed, to leave the pair. Finding a letter she wrote to Fred promising to run away with him, Elizabeth ditches the medication and escapes from Polly and a nurse in order to find Charles. Discovering him to be at a party, Elizabeth is overjoyed to find he wants her back, until Fred learns he is still willing to cheat on her with Annabella.

Heartbroken, Elizabeth reveals to Fred she can't leave him, as she is afraid of being alone. Passing out, she enters a dream sequence, in which Fred helps her to overcome her fear and in the process and free her imprisoned childhood self. Delighted to see she has grown stronger, Fred reveals she no longer needs him, and kisses her before disappearing. Upon awakening, Elizabeth dumps Charles, stands up to Polly – whom she reconciles with and encourages to find a friend – and moves out of her family's home. Days later she visits Mickey and happily discovers that his daughter Natalie is now being looked after by Fred.

== Cast ==
- Phoebe Cates as Elizabeth Cronin
  - Ashley Peldon as Young Elizabeth
- Rik Mayall as Drop Dead Fred
- Marsha Mason as Polly Cronin
- Ron Eldard as Michael "Mickey" Bunce
- Carrie Fisher as Janie
- Tim Matheson as Charles Gretterson
- Daniel Gerroll as Nigel Cronin
- Keith Charles as Murray
- Cheryl Hawker as Nurse
- Peter Breitmayer as Go to Hell Herman
- Clark Niederjohn as Velcro Head
- Tom Bethke as Graggy
- Elizabeth Gray as Namby Pamby
- Bridget Fonda as Annabella (uncredited)
- Eleanor Mondale as Attractive customer
- Bob Reid as Judge Dubben
- Peter Thoemke as Arsonist

== Production ==
Tim Burton and Robin Williams were offered the roles of director and Fred, respectively. They turned them down.

The film's screenplay was rewritten by director Ate de Jong and producer Paul Webster throughout pre-production.

In 2021, de Jong said that during the rewriting process he drew from his experience being molested as a child by his older half-brother, stating, "The trauma of child abuse goes deep and its claws reach far in time. It was not something ever spoken about on the set, not with Rik or anyone, but for me it existed." de Jong cast his own mother in the minor role of Grandma Bunce, who appears in a scene where she has yellow paint dumped on her. Of this casting choice, de Jong said, "The entire crew thought it was cruel and that I should just hire an extra. But she wanted to do it, and I said to everyone, this was cheaper than 10 therapy sessions."

Filming took place in August and September 1990. Filmed in Minneapolis, a large part of the film was filmed at Prince's Paisley Park Studios in the suburb of Chanhassen.

== Reception ==
=== Box office ===
The film, produced on a budget of just under $6.8 million, was released theatrically in the United States and Canada on May 24, 1991, grossing $3,625,648 on its opening weekend, and $13,878,334 over its entire theatrical run. It grossed £1,794,121 in the UK and $24 million worldwide.

=== Critical response ===
On the review aggregator website Rotten Tomatoes, 11% of 36 critics' reviews are positive, with an average rating of 4.1/10. The website's consensus reads: "Tackling mature themes with an infantile sensibility, Drop Dead Fred is an ill-conceived family comedy that is more likely to stir up a headache than the imagination." Metacritic, which uses a weighted average, assigned the film a score of 25 out of 100, based on 19 critics, indicating "generally unfavorable" reviews.

Gene Siskel gave the film zero stars and said "This is easily one of the worst films I've ever seen." Film critic Johanna Steinmetz suggested that its premise was inspired by children with imaginary friends who later develop dissociative identity disorder. Peter Freedman of the Radio Times called it a "largely uninteresting and unfunny comedy", adding, "It's a nice idea, but it falls between all available stools and ends up as a mess on the floor thanks to the poor execution. It's particularly irritating if you've seen the much better Harvey." Angie Errigo of Empire magazine wrote, "There is scarcely a laugh to be had unless you are six years old or immoderately fond of such wheezes as depositing dog poop on a white carpet."

Writing for Entertainment Weekly in 2009, Margaret Lyons asked, "Is it supposed to be hilarious, or a really, really depressing story about the long-term effects of emotional abuse?" Leonard Maltin stated, "Phoebe Cates' appealing performance can't salvage this putrid mess...recommended only for people who think nose-picking is funny."

Despite being a critical failure, the film has gained some status as a cult film. Writing for The Daily Telegraph in 2021, Alexander Larman praised the film, calling it "a sophisticated and ahead-of-its-time black comic exploration of anxiety and depression."

=== Legacy ===
Universal had made plans to produce a remake of Drop Dead Fred in the late 2000s and early 2010s. Comedian Russell Brand was set to portray the eponymous character with Land of the Lost screenwriter Dennis McNicholas and producer Marc Platt also reportedly involved. Development of the film was quietly cancelled following the poor reception to Arthur, another remake starring Brand in the title role.

Drop Dead Fred is a frequent topic of conversation for the podcast How Did This Get Made?, which had one of its more popular episodes dedicated to debating it. Podcast co-hosts June Diane Raphael and Jason Mantzoukas were positive towards the film, with Raphael even calling it one of her favorite films, while fellow co-host Paul Scheer and guest Casey Wilson were critical of it.

Comparisons were drawn between the similar premises of Drop Dead Fred and the 2024 fantasy film IF, directed by and starring John Krasinski, ahead of its release. When asked about this, Krasinski stated he was aware of and liked Drop Dead Fred, but denied any direct connection or inspiration.

== See also ==
- Maladaptive daydreaming
- Schizotypal personality disorder
