= Psychic Fever from Exile Tribe =

Japanese idol boy band

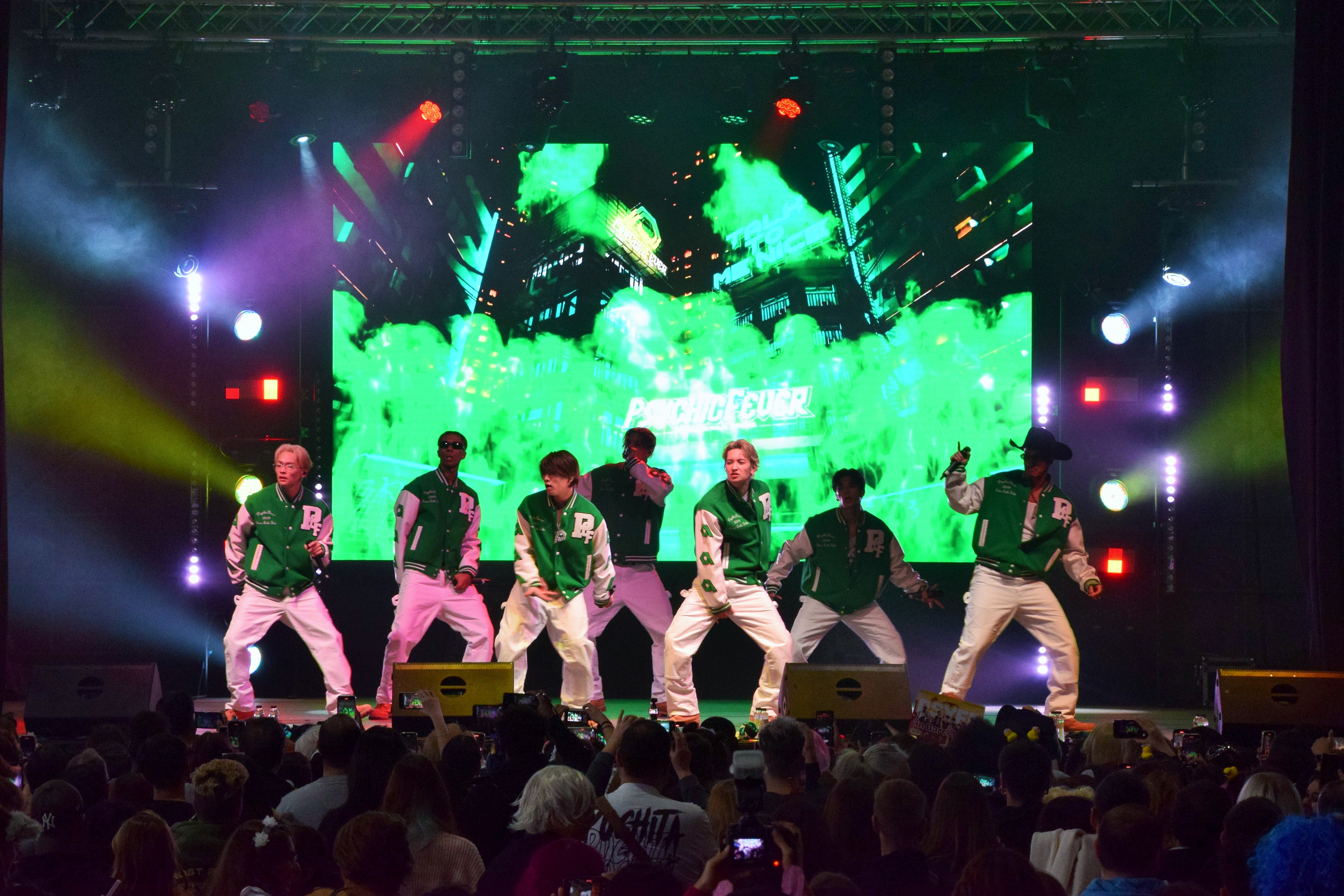
- Psychic Fever perform in Barcelona in 2024; L-R: Ryoga, Jimmy, Ryushin, Weesa, Ren, Kokoro, Tsurugi

Background information
- Origin: Japan
- Genre: J-pop
- Years active: 2022–present
- Labels: LDH; 10K Projects; Warner
- Spinoff of: Exile Tribe
- Members: Tsurugi; Ryoga; Ren; Jimmy; Kokoro; Ryushin; Weesa
- Website: www.ldh.co.jp/eng/management/psychic_fever/

Psychic Fever from Exile Tribe is a Japanese dance and vocal group formed and managed by LDH Japan. The group consists of seven members: Tsurugi, Ryoga, Ren, Jimmy, Kokoro, Ryushin and Weesa, and is part of the Exile Tribe collective. They debuted on 13 July 2022 with the studio album P.C.F. and have pursued international activities in Asia, Europe and the United States.

In February 2025, Psychic Fever signed a global label deal with Warner Music Group, moving their music production from LDH Records to 10K Projects and Warner Music Japan

== History ==
=== 2019–2022: Formation and pre-debut ===
All seven members of Psychic Fever were students of EXPG, a network of dance schools around Japan operated by LDH. The group was formed in 2019 with nine members, including Hanatarou and Sam, and made their first public appearance on 4 July at the BATTLE OF TOKYO ~ENTER THE Jr.EXILE~. Their formation was officially announced by LDH on 24 September, after which they began a Musha shugyō training tour across Japan from October to December. The group travelled through all 47 prefectures and performed on over 100 stages, including appearances as support performers for other LDH artists.

On 31 May 2020, Hanatarou left the group and ended his activities with LDH due to health problems; the group continued with eight members. After the COVID-19 pandemic disrupted their pre-debut activities, Psychic Fever began an online Musha Shugyo through TikTok in July 2021, accompanying the release of their first pre-debut song "Hotline". Throughout the rest of 2021, the group released the pre-debut songs "Best For You", "Tokyo Spiral" and "Snow Candy".

In February 2022, Psychic Fever performed as the opening act for ØMI's Live Tour 2022 "ANSWER...". On 18 April, Sam departed the group and LDH, leaving Psychic Fever as a seven-member group.

=== 2022–2023: Debut and early activities ===
Psychic Fever made their major debut on 13 July 2022 with the studio album P.C.F. and lead single "Choose One". The album debuted at number two on the Oricon Weekly Albums Chart.

From August 2022 to January 2023, Psychic Fever and Ballistik Boyz from Exile Tribe were based in Thailand for a six-month Musha shugyō as part of a partnership between LDH Japan and Thai entertainment company High Cloud Entertainment, with Thai rapper F.Hero serving as their general producer during the programme. The groups' Thai activities were documented in the reality series New School Breakin', which aired on YouTube from October 2022 to March 2023. Psychic Fever performed at Nippon Haku Bangkok in September and received the Next Generation Global Award at the 2022 Genie Music Awards in South Korea in November. In December, they received the Asia Rising Stars Award at the Thailand Digital Awards.

In February 2023, Psychic Fever and Ballistik Boyz held the joint concert Ballistik Boyz vs Psychic Fever The Survival 2023 at CentralWorld in Bangkok, their first standalone concert event outside Japan, to conclude the six-month Thailand programme.

Their first EP, Psychic File I, was released on 17 May and reached number three on the Oricon Weekly Albums Chart. In June, they held their first solo tour in Japan, Psychic Fever Live Tour 2023 "P.C.F", visiting Osaka, Nagoya, Tokyo and Fukuoka. Psychic Fever participated in the 2023 edition of the Battle of Tokyo project in July alongside other Exile Tribe groups, appearing as the fictional alter ego Dung Beat Posse.

They continued to perform in Japan and across Southeast Asia in 2023, including appearances at festivals in Thailand, Malaysia and Indonesia.

=== 2024–present: "Just Like Dat" and international expansion ===
On January 19, the digital EP 99.9 Psychic Radio, produced by JP the Wavy, was released. The lead track "Just Like Dat" charted in the top 50 of Spotify's viral charts in nine Asian countries, including Japan, and has over 200 million views on TikTok.

On April 3, they released their second EP, Psychic File II, which ranked No. 2 on the Oricon Weekly Chart.

On May 2, the group's first variety TV show Psy psy ! Psychic Fever (Nippon TV, 5 episodes) began airing. They filmed on location in Thailand, and each member introduced "charms of Thailand they want to share with Japan."

From September to October, they toured again, performing in Chiang Mai, Kuala Lumpur, and Bangkok.

In October, Kokoro Kohatsu appeared as an actor in the Yomiuri TV/Nippon TV Platinum Night Thursday drama "Octo: Emotion Investigator Shinno Akari Season 2." The group also provided the song "Cold Rain" as the opening theme for the same drama.

On January 9 2025, they released "Paradise," the theme song for their U.S. tour.

From February 2 to 14, they held their first U.S. tour. Starting in Washington D.C. on the 2nd, the tour took place in six cities: New York, Chicago, Dallas, Seattle, and Los Angeles. The final performance in Los Angeles was held at the Saban Theatre. John Fossitt, who served as the music director for the tour and is the lead keyboardist for Bruno Mars' band "The Hooligans," made a special appearance.

On February 14, they released "Wonder Woman". This song was chosen as the opening song for the Tokai TV/Fuji TV nationwide Saturday drama Saikou no Obahan Nakajima Haruko Madam in Chokotto Dake Bangkok.

On February 15, they signed a label deal with Warner Music Group, in partnership with 10K Projects, transferring from LDH Records.

In June, they launched their domestic concert tour Evolve.

On June 18, the group released their third EP Psychic File III, which marked their first project after moving to Warner Music Group/10K Projects.

== Members ==
- Tsurugi (剣)
- Ryoga Nakanishi (中西椋雅)
- Ren Watanabe (渡邉廉)
- Jimmy (ジミー)
- Kokoro Kohatsu (小波津志)
- Ryushin Handa (半田龍臣)
- Weesa (イーサ)

== Discography ==
=== Studio albums ===
Title	Album details	Peak chart positions		Sales
Title	Album details	JPN	JPN Hot	Sales
P.C.F	Released: July 13, 2022; Label: LDH; Formats: CD, digital download	2	15	JPN: 47,592 (Phy.)
Different	Released: July 8, 2026; Label: Warner Music Japan; Formats: CD, digital download	2	8	JPN: 33,648

=== Extended plays ===
Title	EP details	Peak chart positions		Sales
Title	EP details	JPN	JPN Hot	Sales
Psychic File I	Released: May 17, 2023; Label: LDH; Formats: CD, digital download	3	3	JPN: 38,220 (Phy.)
Psychic File II	Released: April 3, 2024; Label: LDH; Formats: CD, |digital download	2	2	JPN: 23,793 (Phy.); JPN: 147 (Dig.)
Psychic File III	Released: May 30, 2025; Label: 10K Projects; Formats: CD, digital download	3	25	JPN: 24,856

=== Digital-only extended plays ===
Title	Album details
99.9 Psychic Radio	Released: January 19, 2024; Label: LDH; Formats: digital download

=== Singles ===
Title	Year	Peak chart positions	Album
Title	Year	JPN Hot	Album
"Hotline"	2022	—	P.C.F
"Best For You"	2022	—	P.C.F
"Tokyo Spiral"	2022	—	P.C.F
"Choose One"	2022	71	P.C.F
"Rich & Bad"	2023	80	Non-album single
"To The Top" (feat. DVI)	2023	—	Psychic File I
"Forever"	2023	—	Psychic File I
"Baku Baku"	2023	93	Psychic File I
"Fire"	2023	—	Psychic File I
"Temperature"	2023	— (Note: "Temperature" did not enter the Hot 100, but appeared at number 78 on the component download chart.)	99.9 Psychic Radio
"Spice" (feat. F.HERO and Bear Knuckle)	2023	—	Non-album single
"Just Like Dat feat. JP THE WAVY"	2024	—	99.9 Psychic Radio
"The Heat"	2024	—	Psychic File II
"Love Fire"	2024	—	Psychic File II
"Perfect" (feat. Jimmy, Weesa)	2024	—	Non-album single
"Talk to Me Nice" (feat. Tamp)	2024	— (Note: "Talk to Me Nice (feat. Tamp)" did not enter the Hot 100, but appeared at number 87 on the component download chart.)	Non-album single
"Shotgun" (feat Jimmy, Weesa)	2024	—	Non-album single
"Paradise"	2025	—	Non-album single
"What's Happenin'"	2025	—	Non-album single
"Wonder Woman"	2025	—	Non-album single
"Gelato"	2025	—	Psychic File III
"Reflection"	2025	—	Psychic File III
"Swish Dat"	2025	—	Non-album single
"I Got Ways"	2026	—	Different
"If You're Mine"	2026	—	Different
"—" denotes releases that did not chart or were not released in that region.

== Tours ==
- Psychic Fever Live Tour 2023 "P.C.F"
- Psychic Fever Asia Tour 2024 "Heat"
- Psychic Fever Live Tour 2025 "Evolve"
