= 99.9 Psychic Radio =

EP by Psychic Fever from Exile Tribe
- Released: January 19, 2024
- Genre: J-pop
- Length: 14:39
- Label: LDH

Psychic Fever from Exile Tribe chronology
| Psychic File I (2023) | 99.9 Psychic Radio (2024) | Psychic File II (2024) |

99.9 Psychic Radio (read as "Ninety-Nine Point Nine Psychic Radio") is an EP by Psychic Fever from Exile Tribe. It was released exclusively in digital format on January 19, 2024.

== Overview ==
This work includes four tracks produced by JP the Wavy, including "Temperature", which was previously released digitally in October 2023. The title 99.9 Psychic Radio draws inspiration from the idea that the hip-hop genre originally expanded its reach globally through mixtapes and radio stations. The EP is set up with the concept of a fictional radio program called Psychic Radio, airing on the imaginary station 99.9 MHz.

When listened to as a whole, the four tracks are structured in a way that evokes the feeling of tuning into a program broadcast on the fictional radio station (99.9 MHz).

The jacket artwork was created by the creative team Dope. The design features the members wearing Y2K fashion, creating a visual reminiscent of the covers of American hip-hop magazines from the 2000s.

The lead track, "Just Like Dat", is a driving tune that expresses the frustration of a man who cannot seem to get the attention of the girl he really likes. The song blends modern beats with melodic elements and drum programming that evoke the vibes of 2000s hip-hop. JP the Wavy not only produced the track but is also featured as a guest artist.

Other tracks include "Psyfe Cypher", a freestyle rap track in the style of a radio program featuring Tsurugi, Ryoga Nakanishi, Jimmy, and Ryushin Handa, and "Rocket (Take You Higher)", a long-distance love song between Thailand and Japan that invites the listener to relax and escape the noise of the city, with standout rap and vocals from Kokoro Kohatsu, Weesa, and Ren Watanabe.

In September of the same year, "Just Like Dat" surpassed 240 million total views on the video-sharing app TikTok. On September 28, an English version titled was released digitally. The English lyrics were translated by Shurland Ayers.

== Music video ==
The music video for the lead track "Just Like Dat" featuring JP the Wavy was directed by Spikey John. JP the Wavy also participated in the supervision of the video's concept, choreography, and styling, and appears in the video. The choreography was done by member Ryushin Handa, along with Kaita and KAZtheFIRE, who were teammates of Handa's in the dance team Riehatatokyo. The video was released on YouTube on the same day as the EP.

== Track listing ==
1. "Just Like Dat" featuring JP the Wavy – 3:11
2. "Psyfe Cypher" – 5:09
3. "Temperature" – 3:06
4. "Rocket (Take You Higher)" – 3:12
