= Paradise (Psychic Fever song) =

Single by Psychic Fever
- Language: Japanese
- Released: January 9, 2025
- Length: 2:50
- Label: LDH Records

Music video
- Paradise on YouTube

"Paradise" is a song by Psychic Fever from Exile Tribe, a 7-member boy group (KOKORO, WEESA, TSURUGI, RYOGA, REN, JIMMY, RYUSHIN) from the LDH artist collective Exile Tribe. The song was released as a digital single on January 9, 2025.

With the new song "Paradise", the group presents its first U.S. tour, 'PSYCHIC FEVER FIRST U.S. TOUR 2025,' beginning on February 2.

== Overview ==
“Paradise” is a disco-inspired track infused with a rare groove vibe, capturing the exhilarating feeling of flying to the person of your dreams, flight ticket in hand. The lyrics also symbolize PSYCHIC FEVER’s journey - a heartfelt reflection on finally achieving their dream of performing in the U.S. and embracing their devoted fans in a world uniquely their own.

The track is produced by JIGG, one of Japan’s most influential hip-hop beatmakers, renowned for crafting PSYCHIC FEVER’s viral hit “Just Like Dat feat. JP THE WAVY.” The song achieved 260 million plays on TikTok and charted on Spotify’s Viral Charts in nine countries and regions across Asia. The lyrics are written by ELIONE, a talented rapper and producer celebrated for his exceptional rhyming skills and uplifting messages. JIGG and ELIONE have teamed up to create an innovative sound that represents a new era for PSYCHIC FEVER.

== Music video ==
Music video director: Masaki Watanabe (maxilla)

=== Concept of the music video ===
The music video for "Paradise" is inspired by the vibrant atmosphere of the 1980s. Set in a retro world, the members of PSYCHIC FEVER perform in costumes reminiscent of 80s music programs and commercials. The main stage features a live backing band, evoking the charm and energy of an 80s boy band.

=== Highlights of the music video ===
This music video offers an elegant shift from the usual sleek and modern style of PSYCHIC FEVER. Instead, it embraces a playful retro aesthetic that balances coolness with nostalgia. A standout feature is the contrast between PSYCHIC FEVER’s signature polished dance performances and their lighthearted acting in commercial-inspired scenes. Each of the seven members uniquely embodies a character that resonates with the song’s lyrics, adding a layer of charm and individuality to the visual storytelling.

Videos related to "Paradise"
Release date	Title		Link
January 5, 2025	『Paradise』	Official Music Video Teaser 1	▶
January 7, 2025	『Paradise』	Official Music Video Teaser 2	▶
January 9, 2025	『Paradise』	Official Music Video	▶

== Performances ==
2025 PSYCHIC FEVER First U.S. Tour – Powered by “Paradise”

- Feb 2 Washington, D.C.
- Feb 5 New York, NY
- Feb 8 Chicago, IL
- Feb 10 Dallas, TX
- Feb 12 Seattle, WA
- Feb 14 Los Angeles, CA
