= Psychic File II =

EP by Psychic Fever from Exile Tribe
- Released: April 3, 2024
- Genre: J-pop
- Length: 22:03
- Label: LDH

Psychic Fever from Exile Tribe chronology
99.9 Psychic Radio (2024)	Psychic File II (2024)	Psychic File III (2025)

Psychic File II is the second original EP (mini album) by the Japanese dance and vocal group Psychic Fever from Exile Tribe.

It was released by LDH Records on April 3, 2024, and contains a total of seven tracks.

This work, released about a year after their previous EP PSYCHIC FILE I, reflects the group's new challenges and experiences gained through expanding their activities across the Asian region.

== Background and production ==
This EP, released about a year after Psychic File I (released in May 2023), was produced following the group's activities in Asia, including Thailand.

Recording and collaborations were also conducted locally in Thailand, and the overall musical direction emphasizes global sensibilities.

Regarding this release, member Ryoga Nakanishi commented, "The Psychic File series is a collection of genreless songs. We are creating it with the concept of building a diverse collection of tracks that could eventually be released as X (10), XX (20), XXX (30)..."

The members position this work as "a product reflecting experiences overseas, especially in Asia", and it is structured with global expansion in mind.

== Songs ==
The first lead track, "Love Fire", features a Y2K-inspired sound that incorporates classic R&B and Atlanta bass elements. The music video was directed by Spikey John, who also directed "Just Like Dat feat. JP THE WAVY." The choreography was handled by member JIMMY and professional dancer Macoto, a member of RIEHATATOKYO who is active globally.

The second lead track, "Bee-Po", incorporates expressions aimed at the SNS generation and portrays the passive love troubles characteristic of Gen Z. The music video was directed by Spikey John.

"The Heat" was produced as the kickoff song for the "PSYCHIC FEVER ASIA TOUR 2024 ‘HEAT’."

The track "Fire" featuring Sprite is a collaborative song produced with Thai hip-hop label High Cloud Entertainment, and was digitally released in September 2023.

"Ignition" is the group's first towel song, created with live performance in mind. "Pinky Swear" was used as the ending theme for the TV Tokyo drama "Suki na Otoko to Waketai."

"Dokoni" is a dance track based on Latin music.

== Promotion and performances ==
Ahead of the EP's release, the track "The Heat" was digitally pre-released as a single on March 2, 2024.

On TV, the group's first terrestrial variety show "PSY PSY! PSYCHIC FEVER" began airing on Nippon TV in May 2024, featuring a special performance of "Love Fire" on the program.

Additionally, from May 2024, the group embarked on their first Asian tour "PSYCHIC FEVER ASIA TOUR 2024 'HEAT'", with the EP's tracks forming the core of the setlist.

== Chart performance and reception ==
PSYCHIC FILE II debuted at No. 2 on the Oricon Weekly Album Ranking in its first week, marking the group's highest position to date.

It also debuted at No. 2 on Billboard Japan's comprehensive Hot Albums chart.

The EP sold 22,582 copies in its first week. On Billboard Japan, it ranked No. 2 in Top Album Sales and No. 17 in the Download Albums category.

== Track listing ==
Psychic File II track listing
No.	Title	Lyrics	Music	Arrangement	Length
1.	"The Heat"	Elione	Gabriel Brandes; Alexander Karlsson; Harry Sommerdahl; Fabian Torsson	Bangers&Ca$h	2:56
2.	"Love Fire"	Elione	Nils Rulewski Stenberg; Julie Yu	Nils Rulewski Stenberg for Hitfire Production	3:11
3.	"Ignition"	Elione; Jay'ed	Daniel Kim; Karrinator; Elione; Jay'ed		2:44
4.	"Bee-Po"	Tamp; Ben Bizzy; Mona V; K.Don	Nino; Ben Bizzy; Mona V; Tamp	Karrinator	2:52
5.	"Fire" (featuring Sprite)	Sprite; Ben Bizzy; OG Bobby; Archy; Tamp	Sprite; Ben Bizzy; OG Bobby; Archy; Tamp		3:51
6.	"Pinky Swear"	K.Don	Masaki Tomiyama; Yuuki Sano	Masaki Tomiyama	3:12
7.	"Dokoni"	K.Don	Maxx Song; Mehigh; Fast Lane; Tony Ferrari		3:14
Total length:					22:03
