= Blue Tree (boutique) =

Boutique in New York City

Coordinates: 40.78433°N 73.95613°W

- Founded: October 2005
- Founder: Phoebe Cates
- Headquarters: New York City, United States
- Website: bluetreeny.bigcartel.com

Blue Tree is a boutique on the Upper East Side of New York City, opened by former actress Phoebe Cates.

== Background ==
"Phoebe Cates Kline was so fond of the Upper East Side branch of gift store Penny Whistle that when it closed, she simply had to replace it.”

The store sells chocolate, diamonds, jewelry, clothing, antiques, perfume, candles, art, photography, books, vintage LPs, and stuffed animals.

Upon opening, the store manager was Ivana Callahan.

The New York Times referred to the store as "a version of Elizabeth Street for the Carnegie Hill crowd, a little oasis of downtown aesthetic at Ladies Who Lunch prices", and said that "the celebrity boutique is a way for famous people to admit the civilian into their universe; it is a presentation of themselves, their likes and desires, their preferences—and does not require them to step in front of a camera."

Cates stated "I always wanted to have a general store." Cates also said that some of her customers tell her that she looks like Phoebe Cates, and that she responds to them by saying "I get that a lot."

The name of the store was suggested by Kevin Kline, Cates' husband. The store's name is a reference to the blue trees in Fauvist paintings; with the idea being that just as blue trees seem out of place in a forest, a store like Blue Tree seems out of place on the Upper East Side.
