= Bohemian (album) =

Studio album by Judy Collins
- Released: October 18, 2011
- Genre: Pop; folk
- Length: 43:50
- Label: Wildflower
- Producer: Judy Collins

Judy Collins chronology
Paradise (2010)	Bohemian (2011)	Live at the Metropolitan Museum of Art (2012)

Bohemian is a studio album by American singer Judy Collins, released on October 18, 2011, by her own label, Wildflower Records.

For the album, the singer wrote four new songs ("Morocco," "Wings of Angels," "In the Twilight," and "Big Sur"), and recorded seven cover versions, including "Pure Imagination" from the film Willy Wonka & the Chocolate Factory and "Cactus Tree" from the repertoire of Joni Mitchell is in a duet with Shawn Colvin.

The album's release coincided with the release of Collins' autobiography Sweet Judy Blue Eyes.

== Critical reception ==
Professional ratings
Review scores
Source	Rating
AllMusic	3.5/5 stars
Record Collector	3/5 stars

Nick Coleman from The Independent wrote: "She was the 1960s 'folk' diva who captivated Stephen Stills et al and stood fast against the forces of ugliness and repression with a voice like a silken banner whipped in a hurricane of romantic right thinking: a blue-eyed, wheat-blonde Joan Baez. Here she is again, reflecting on the days of her youth, with simple piano-driven arrangements."

== Track listing ==
No.	Title	Writer(s)	Length
1.	"Morocco"	Judy Collins	4:38
2.	"Cactus Tree"	Joni Mitchell	4:48
3.	"Pure Imagination"	Leslie Bricusse; Anthony Newley	2:43
4.	"Wings of Angels"	Collins	4:12
5.	"Veteran's Day"	Michael Veitch	3:53
6.	"The Desperate One"	Jacques Brel; Gérard Jouannest	3:00
7.	"Pastures of Plenty"	Woody Guthrie	3:07
8.	"All the Pretty Horses"	Traditional	2:45
9.	"Campo de Encino"	Jimmy Webb	3:59
10.	"In the Twilight"	Collins	6:10
11.	"Big Sur"	Collins	4:35
Total length:			43:50
