= Paradise (Judy Collins album) =

Studio album by Judy Collins
- Released: June 4, 2010
- Genre: Pop; folk
- Length: 43:16
- Label: Wildflower
- Producer: Alan Silverman; Judy Collins

Judy Collins chronology
Judy Collins Sings Lennon and McCartney (2007)	Paradise (2010)	Bohemian (2011)

Paradise is a studio album by American singer Judy Collins, released on June 4, 2010, by Wildflower Records.

The album features mostly cover versions of songs by other artists. The only original composition on the album is the song "Kingdom Come", written by Collins under the influence of the events of September 11, 2001 and dedicated to the rescuers. The album also features duets with Joan Baez and Stephen Stills.

== Critical reception ==
A reviewer of Classic Pop Icons noted that there is not a single bad song on the album, and Collins' voice holds up much better than some of her contemporaries. Claire Allfree, in a review for Metro, called the album blissful and beautiful, noting the singer's vocals and piano and guitar arrangements. Terry Staunton from Record Collector also gave a positive assessment of the album.

== Track listing ==
No.	Title	Writer(s)	Length
1.	"Over the Rainbow"	E.Y. Harburg; Harold Arlen	3:29
2.	"Diamonds and Rust" (duet with Joan Baez)	Joan Baez	3:35
3.	"Once I Was"	Larry Beckett; Tim Buckley	3:13
4.	"Weight of the World"	Amy Speace; Jon Vezner; Jud Caswell	5:40
5.	"Last Thing on My Mind" (duet with Stephen Stills)	Tom Paxton	2:58
6.	"Dens of Yarrow"	Traditional	4:32
7.	"Kingdom Come"	Judy Collins	6:12
8.	"Emilio"	Michael Johnson	3:53
9.	"Ghost Riders in the Sky"	Stanley Davis Jones	3:54
10.	"Gauguin"	Jimmy Webb	5:50
Total length:			43:16

== Charts ==
Chart performance for Paradise
Chart (2010)	Peak position
UK Independent Albums (OCC)	49
US Americana/Folk Albums (Billboard)	11
