= Paradise, West Virginia =

Paradise
- Unincorporated community
- Location within the state of West Virginia Paradise (the United States)
- Coordinates: 38.58481°N 81.79985°W
- Country: United States
- State: West Virginia
- County: Putnam
- Elevation: 1,027 ft (313 m)
- Time zone: UTC-5 (Eastern (EST))
  - Summer (DST): UTC-4 (EDT)
- GNIS ID: 1544568

Paradise is an unincorporated community in Putnam County, West Virginia, United States. Its post office closed in 1943.
