= Live at the Metropolitan Museum of Art =

Live album by Judy Collins
- Released: October 16, 2012
- Genre: Pop; folk
- Length: 49:10
- Label: Wildflower
- Producer: Judy Collins

Judy Collins chronology
Bohemian (2011)	Live at the Metropolitan Museum of Art (2012)	Live in Ireland (2014)

Live at the Metropolitan Museum of Art is a live album by American singer Judy Collins, released on October 16, 2012, by Wildflower Records.

== Overview ==
This album was recorded at the Temple of Dendur at the Metropolitan Museum of Art in New York during a concert to celebrate the fiftieth anniversary of Judy Collins' career. The set list includes some of her biggest hits, including "Both Sides, Now," "Send In the Clowns," "Mr. Tambourine Man," and "The Moon Is a Harsh Mistress," the latter sung with composer Jimmy Webb on piano and backing vocals. A video recording of the performance was broadcast on PBS. This special television program was nominated for the New York Emmy Awards and won a bronze medal at the 2013 New York International Television and Film Festival.

== Critical reception ==
Professional ratings
Review scores
Source	Rating
AllMusic	3.5/5 stars

Thom Jurek, in his review for AllMusic, noted that over the years, the elegance, mystery, sophistication and charm of Judy Collins' voice has not disappeared anywhere, on the contrary, he noticed that the voice has become richer and the range has expanded. He also stated that songs performed for decades still sound today without affectation or a hint of fatigue.

== Track listing ==
No.	Title	Writer(s)	Length
1.	"Open the Door"	Judy Collins	4:35
2.	"Both Sides, Now"	Joni Mitchell	3:19
3.	"Diamonds and Rust"	Joan Baez	3:48
4.	"Campo de Encino"	Jimmy Webb	4:01
5.	"Pure Imagination"	Leslie Bricusse; Anthony Newley	2:37
6.	"Helplessly Hoping"	Stephen Stills	3:28
7.	"Pastures of Plenty"	Woody Guthrie	3:48
8.	"In the Twilight"	Collins	6:29
9.	"Intro to Mr. Tambourine Man" (Spoken)	Collins	0:59
10.	"Mr. Tambourine Man"	Bob Dylan	5:00
11.	"The Moon Is a Harsh Mistress"	Webb	3:31
12.	"Since You've Asked"	Collins	2:47
13.	"Send In the Clowns"	Stephen Sondheim	4:48
Total length:			49:10

== Personnel ==
- Judy Collins – vocal, guitar
- Eric Weissberg – banjo, mandolin
- Zev Katz – bass
- Yoed Nir – cello
- Tony Beard – drums
- Ira Siegel – guitar
