= Marilyn Baker =

British singer-songwriter

Marilyn Baker is a Christian songwriter and singer.

Ref:

== Albums ==
- Christmas With Marilyn Baker, 2005
- All That I Am, 2004
- From The Beginning, 2002
- Changing Me/Overflow Of Worship, 2002
- Overflow Of Worship, 1999
- Changing Me, 1996
- Live '95, 1995
- Authentic Classics: Live In Concert, 1995
- By Your Side, 1994
- The Best Of Marilyn Baker, 1993
- Face To Face, 1992
- A New Beginning, 1990
- Close To His Heart, 1987
- An Evening With Marilyn Baker (Live), 1986
- Marilyn Baker, 1985
- Refresh Me Lord, 1983
- Whispers Of God, 1981
- He Gives Joy, 1979
