= Paradise (Kaci Battaglia album) =

Studio album by Kaci Battaglia
- Released: October 20, 2001 (Japan) February 4, 2002 (UK) July 16, 2002 (US)
- Recorded: 1999–2001
- Genres: Pop; dance-pop; R&B
- Label: Curb
- Producers: Joel Diamond; Aaron Sain; Walter Turbitt; Jim Frazier; Brian Nash; Kaci Battaglia; Jason Levine; James Bryan McCollum; Rudy Pérez; Morten Schjolin; Darren Terao

Kaci Battaglia chronology
Paradise (2001)	Bring It On (2010)

Singles from Paradise
- 1. "Paradise" Released: February 26, 2001; 2. "Tu Amor" Released: July 16, 2001; 3. "I Think I Love You" Released: January 21, 2002; 4. "I'm Not Anybody's Girl" Released: July 28, 2003

Paradise is the debut album by the American singer Kaci Battaglia. It was first released in Japan on October 20, 2001, followed by a UK release on February 4, 2002. The album was released in the United States on July 16, 2002 under the title I'm Not Anybody's Girl.

The album debuted at number 47 on the UK Albums Chart. It included several successful singles, including the lead single "Paradise", "Tu Amor", and a cover of "I Think I Love You".

== Background ==
Kaci began singing and performing from a young age. She auditioned for Joel Diamond after her mother responded to an advert looking for a singer. She then signed with Curb Records in 2000 at age 12. The music video for her debut single Paradise was filmed at the Santa Monica Pier in August 2000.

== Composition ==
Paradise is a teen pop album with influences from dance-pop and Latin music. The Hartlepool Northern Daily Mail described its title track as a "catchy pop song with a foot-tapping Latin beat", The Daily Express said the album had a mixture of pop, funk and ballads. "Intervention Divine" takes a different direction, described by the Tampa Tribune as a "driving, synthesized rock anthem". Its lyrics address various social problems through a message of faith.

Kaci contributed to the album's production, co-producing "Beggin' Me" with Aaron Sain and receiving another production credit on "Butterflies Don't Lie".

== Singles ==
Singles from Paradise
Single	Year	IRL	UK	SCO	GRE	THA	US Sales	US Maxi
"Paradise"	2001	10	11	11	6	7	50	43
"Tu Amor"	2001	—	24	21	—	—	—	—
"I Think I Love You"	2002	16	10	8	—	—	—	—
"I'm Not Anybody's Girl"	2003	—	55	50	—	—	—	—
"—" denotes a recording that did not chart or was not released in that country.

"Paradise" was released as the album's lead single on February 23, 2001 in Ireland and February 26 in the UK. The song spent nine weeks on the UK Singles Chart and thirteen weeks on the Irish chart. In the US, "Paradise" spent 15 weeks on the Billboard Hot 100 Singles Sales chart. The song was remixed by Walter Turbitt for Brian Rawling/Rive Droite Music.

"Tu Amor" was reported to have reached the top ten in Japan. Walter Turbitt also produced and mixed the song for Brian Rawling Productions.

"I Think I Love You" was produced by Joel Diamond and remixed by Jason Levine and James McCollum.

"I'm Not Anybody's Girl" was also included on the soundtrack to the film View from the Top. The single also reached number seven on HMV's weekly Top 10 singles chart.

== Promotion ==
In January 2001, a special video for the song "Paradise" was filmed and produced for the pre-game show of Super Bowl XXXV in Tampa, Florida, and shown on the stadium's screens. Kaci then travelled to the UK and on March 9 performed the song on BBC One's Top of the Pops.

In the US, she performed at 93.3 WFLZ's "The Big One" concert on August 25, 2001, at the Ice Palace in Tampa, Florida, alongside acts including Smash Mouth, LFO and Jessica Simpson. She also opened for O-Town, the Backstreet Boys and *NSYNC when they toured the US.

In the summer of 2002, Pepsi sponsored a promotional mall tour, with Kaci giving free performances across several US states.

== US release ==
On July 16, 2002, the album was released in the US under the title I'm Not Anybody's Girl, with 14 tracks. Despite the name change, "I'm Not Anybody's Girl" was not newly added, having previously appeared as track 11 on the 2001 Japanese edition of Paradise.

== Track listing ==
The 2002 UK edition of Paradise.

Paradise – 2002 UK edition
No.	Title	Length
1.	"Paradise"	4:02
2.	"Kiss Me Crazy"	3:14
3.	"Butterflies Don't Lie"	4:17
4.	"Tu Amor"	4:12
5.	"Everlasting"	4:02
6.	"I Think I Love You"	3:30
7.	"Just an Old Boyfriend"	3:14
8.	"Beggin' Me"	3:45
9.	"All Over You"	2:43
10.	"You Got Me"	2:44
11.	"I'm Not Anybody's Girl"	3:13
12.	"I'm Gonna Break Your Heart This Time"	3:31
13.	"Intervention Divine"	4:23
14.	"Un Paraiso" (Spanish vocals)	4:01
15.	"Eternamente" (Spanish vocals)	4:02
16.	"Tu Amor" (Spanish vocals)	3:43

The earlier 2001 Japanese album is slightly different. Track 8 has a longer title "Don't Come Beggin' Me", "Intervention Divine" is not included, tracks 13-15 are the Spanish versions. Track 16 is "Seventh Wonder of the World" being the bonus track.

On February 21, 2002, a two disc Japanese edition titled Paradise - Remix Plus was released. This included "Intervention Divine" and a bonus CD with seven remixes.

The 2002 US release has the same first 14 tracks as the UK, ending with "Un Paraisio".

A 2003 Japanese reissue, listed as US version with DVD included "Paradise (mirrorballismix)" on track 14, a remix by Dance Man. The DVD featured "I'm Not Anybody's Girl" and the music videos for "Paradise", "Tu Amor" and "I Think I Love You".
