= Paradise (Hmong band) =

Hmong-American pop band

Paradise is a Hmong-American pop band originally started in 1989. Consisting of seven members; Ko Yang (Lead Singer), Phong Yang (Bass), Haget Yang (Drummer), Long Her (Keyboard), Kou Thor (Piano), Cina Chang (Keyboard), Nao Vang (Guitar), and April Vang (Lead Vocalist), the group features diverse talents.

Since 1997, Paradise has performed throughout the United States and has also been featured in Asian Media, such as Hmong Magazine, Asian Team Magazine, and many others.

During the year of 2006, the musical group had their last tour, and disbanded.

Paradise re-united and performed at the 2013 second annual Hmong Music Festival in Fresno, CA. Received a music award during the HMA in 2014 Sacramento, CA.

The Hmong musical band will be gathering and performing once again in Fresno, CA on December 26, 2017.

== Discography ==
Albums

- Nhriav Tus Hlub
- Innocent Love
- Lost in Paradise
- Heavenly Sent
- Fine Girl
- Shooting Star
- Special Remix Album
- Story of Life
