= Nak-won =

Nak-won or Ragwŏn (Korean: 낙원 or 락원), meaning "paradise", may refer to:

- Gil Nak-won (길낙원), character in the South Korean television series Come and Hug Me
- Hong Nak-won (Korean: 홍낙원; Hanja: 洪樂遠), Great-Great-Great-grandson of Princess Jeongmyeong
- Kang Nak-won (강낙원; 姜洛遠), athlete who was active during the Japanese colonial period
- Kwak Nak-won (곽낙원; 郭樂園; 1859–1939), Korean independence activist
- Nagwon-dong (낙원동; 樂園洞), dong in neighbourhood of Jongno-gu, Seoul, South Korea
- Ragwon County (락원군; 樂園郡), county in South Hamgyŏng province, North Korea
- "Paradise" (낙원), song by BTS
- "Paradise" (낙원), song by Psy
- "Paradise" (낙원), song in the album Mirotic by TVXQ
- Paradise (낙원 - 파라다이스), 2009 South Korean film starring Ji Jin-hee, Kim Ha-neul and Kim Yoo-jung directed by Lee Jang-soo
- Ragwŏn-dong (락원동; 樂園洞), dong in Chongnam, South P'yŏngan province, North Korea

== See also ==
- Nak Won, a 2002 recording by Carl Stone
- Paradise (disambiguation)
- Ragwon Station (disambiguation)
