= Ragwon Station =

Ragwŏn Station (Korean: 락원역) may refer to:

- Ragwŏn Station (P'yŏngyang), Hyŏksin Line, P'yŏngyang Metro in Taesŏng-guyŏk, P'yŏngyang
- Ragwŏn Station (P'yŏngŭi Line) in Ragwŏn 1-dong, Sinŭiju, North P'yŏngan Province
- Ragwŏn Station (P'yŏngra Line) in Ragwŏn County, South Hamgyŏng Province
- Ragwŏn station, railway station of Yangsi Line
