= Body Shots (song) =

Single by Kaci Battaglia featuring Ludacris

from the album Bring It On
- Released: July 13, 2010
- Recorded: 2008
- Length: 4:03
- Label: Curb
- Songwriter(s): Kaci, Michael Grant, Arianna Wilson, Jarreau and Trevor Pitts

Kaci singles chronology
"Crazy Possessive" (2009)	"Body Shots" (2010)

Alternative covers
- Remixes cover

"Body Shots", is a song of the American pop singer Kaci Battaglia. It is the second single from her second studio album Bring It On (2010).

== Background ==
The lyrics for "Body Shots" were penned by Battaglia based on a conversation she had with some of her girlfriends right before her 21st birthday. She co-wrote all of the songs on the album. "I had been talking to some of my friends about what we were going to do when I turned 21," Battaglia explains, "and they were pushing for me to try a body shot. Later that day, when we were in the studio, I decided to see if I could capture what that experience might be like in a song. It was really fun to write and it already goes down a storm when I perform it live!" "Body Shots" was written by her and long-time collaborators Michael Grant, Arianna Wilson, and Jarreau and Trevor Pitts.

== Release ==
The song was released through digital music retailers on July 13, 2010, and its EP of remixes was released on August 10, 2010. The song has been a success in the United States clubs, reaching number one at the Billboard Hot Dance Club Play chart.

== Music video ==
The video premiered at Battaglia's official YouTube page on August 22, 2010. It features her and some girls dancing in the studio and also a guest appearance by Ludacris.

=== Background ===
About the video, Battaglia says, "Ludacris and I had an incredible time shooting the clip with European director, Stephanie Pistel – working in studios in both New York City and Miami. We took a very symbolic approach to the video and hope that we came up with something classy, fresh and fun."

== Track listing ==
Digital single

1. "Body Shots" (Main Version) - 4:03

Remixes

1. "Body Shots" (Mig & Rizzo Radio Edit) - 3:19
2. "Body Shots" (Wawa Radio Edit) - 3:05
3. "Body Shots" (Dave Audé Radio Edit) - 4:02
4. "Body Shots" (Ray Roc & Gabe Ramos Club Mix) - 6:15
5. "Body Shots" (Wawa Extended Mix) - 5:20
6. "Body Shots" (Dave Audé Club Mix) - 7:24
7. "Body Shots" (Mig & Rizzo Club Mix) - 5:47

== Release history ==
Country	Release date	Format	Label
United States	July 13, 2010	Digital download	Curb Records
United States	August 10, 2010	Remixes EP	Curb Records

== Charts ==
Chart (2010)	Peak position
US Billboard Hot Dance Club Play	1
US Billboard Hot Dance Club Play Year End Chart	8

== See also ==
- List of number-one dance singles of 2010 (U.S.)
