= Paradise (surname) =

Paradise is a surname. Notable people with the surname include:

- Bob Paradise (born 1944), American ice hockey player
- Dick Paradise (born 1945), American ice hockey player
- Jack Paradise (1925–2021), American pediatrician
- Michelle Paradise (born 1972), American writer, producer, and actress
