= Psychic File III =

EP by Psychic Fever from Exile Tribe
- Released: May 30, 2025
- Genre: J-pop
- Length: 12:05
- Label: 10K Projects

Psychic Fever from Exile Tribe chronology
Psychic File II (2024)	Psychic File III (2025)

Psychic File III is the third original EP by the Japanese dance and vocal group Psychic Fever from Exile Tribe. It is their first release in about a year since their previous work Psychic File II, and also marks their first release after transferring to the Warner Music Group-affiliated label 10K Projects.

The EP consists of four newly written songs, presenting an ambitious work that showcases a new approach to the group's musicality.

The digital release date is May 30, 2025, and the physical CD release date is June 18, 2025.

== Background ==
This work was produced following the group's global activities after the release of Psychic File II. In 2024, Psychic Fever successfully held their first solo tour in Asia, and in February 2025, they completed their first tour in the United States. The members commented that "through our global activities, the group's color and individuality have become even more defined."

Reflecting those experiences, this EP was created from a more international perspective, as their first release under the global contract with Warner Music Japan and the U.S.-based 10K Projects.

The lead digital single "Gelato", described as an "early summer tune", shifts away from the traditional "PSYFE-style" hip-hop vibe. With soft and sweet vocals by the members, the song expresses the intense feelings of love.

The jacket and artist photos are themed around "Tokyo Predawn", portraying a new side of the group by fusing mode, street, and hip-hop styling against the backdrop of a quiet cityscape just before dawn.

== Track listing ==
1. "Reflection" – 3:20
2. "Gelato" – 2:56
3. "Evolve" – 2:41
4. "Promise" – 3:08

== Charts ==
Chart performance for Psychic File III
Chart (2025)	Peak position
Japanese Albums (Oricon)	3
Japanese Combined Albums (Oricon)	3
Japanese Hot Albums (Billboard Japan)	25
