= Paradise Township =

Paradise Township may refer to:

- Paradise Township, Coles County, Illinois
- Paradise Township, Crawford County, Iowa
- Paradise Township, Russell County, Kansas
- Paradise Township, Michigan
- Paradise Township, Eddy County, North Dakota, in Eddy County, North Dakota
- Paradise Township, Lancaster County, Pennsylvania
- Paradise Township, Monroe County, Pennsylvania
- Paradise Township, York County, Pennsylvania
