= Just Like Dat =

Single by Psychic Fever from Exile Tribe featuring JP the Wavy
- Language: English; Japanese
- Released: January 19, 2024
- Length: 3:11
- Label: LDH Records
- Composers: JP the Wavy; JIGG; Nvmbrr
- Lyricists: JP the Wavy; Nvmbrr

"Just Like Dat" is a song by Japanese dance and vocal group Psychic Fever from Exile Tribe featuring JP the Wavy. It was digitally released by LDH Records on 19 January 2024, as the lead track from the four-track digital EP 99.9 Psychic Radio, produced by JP the Wavy.

The lyrics were written by JP the Wavy and Nvmbrr, with composition by JIGG, JP the Wavy, and Nvmbrr. The track production (arrangement) was handled by Japanese hip-hop producer JIGG.

This song features a fusion of elements reminiscent of 2000s hip-hop and modern trap beats, with the theme of "the frustration of a man who can't get the girl he really wants to turn around and notice him." JP the Wavy, who produced the track, also participated as a featured rapper. After its release, the song went viral on TikTok and became a signature song for the group.

== Background ==
This track is the lead song of the conceptual EP 99.9 Psychic Radio, produced by JP the Wavy for Psychic Fever.The EP title is based on the concept of a fictional radio station called "Psychic Radio" broadcasting at 99.9 MHz. It reflects the desire to send the group's music out to the world, drawing inspiration from how hip-hop spread globally through mixtapes and radio. In production, beatmaker JIGG provided the beats, while JP the Wavy guided the direction of the songs. Upon the release, Psychic Fever members said, "Even before we entered the production period, JP the Wavy kindly worked with us during the recording sessions and helped bring out our 'artistic character' and 'musicality,' giving rise to a new potential in Psychic Fever like never before."

JP the Wavy commented on the EP, saying, "I expressed what I felt Psychic Fever is like, and also created it with the image of 'this is the kind of Psychic Fever I want to see' in mind," indicating that he aimed to showcase a new side of the group.

== Music video ==
The music video (MV) for this track was released on YouTube at midnight on 19 January 2024, the same day as the EP release, and surpassed 10 million views within a few months.

The MV features dance performances by the members dressed in "Y2K"-style outfits, captured with simple lighting and editing.

The director was filmmaker Spikey John. JP the Wavy was also involved in the visual production, overseeing the MV's structure, choreography, and costumes, and appeared in the video. The choreography was mainly created by member Tatsumi Handa, along with KAITA and KAZtheFIRE, who were part of the dance team "RIEHATATOKYO" to which he once belonged.

== Promotion ==
After its release, "Just Like Dat feat. JP THE WAVY" was promoted in various ways.

As a tie-in, it was used as the ending theme for Yomiuri TV's music information program "Cune!!" for February 2024, and was broadcast on terrestrial television.

Numerous dance videos using this track were posted on TikTok, many with the hashtag "#justlikedatchallenge."

Backed by this popularity, the group was selected as the 24th Monthly Artist in the "Buzz Tracker" program jointly run by TikTok and Spotify to support artists.

In terms of TV appearances, they performed the song live for the first time on television on 10 April 2024, on the Nippon TV program "DayDay."

On 17 May 2024, they appeared with JP the Wavy on the YouTube channel "The First Take" and delivered a one-take performance.

On 18 July, the First Take version of "Just Like Dat feat. JP THE WAVY" was released digitally.

The song was also performed at the 2024 live tour "Psychic Fever ASIA TOUR 2024 'Heat'" and at various events, becoming a staple number that excited audiences.

In particular, the song received significant response at overseas shows. At the group's first U.S. tour "Psychic Fever FIRST US TOUR 2025," it was performed as the encore, and reports noted that the local audience joined in chorus with "Just Like Dat!"

== Chart performance ==
The digital EP "99.9 Psychic Radio," which includes "Just Like Dat feat. JP THE WAVY", reached a peak of No. 11 on the Oricon Weekly Digital Album Ranking. On Spotify's "Viral Top 50," the song charted in eight Asian countries including Japan, ranking in the top five in Singapore, Malaysia, and the Philippines.

On Billboard Japan's "Japan Songs" global chart, it ranked No. 10 in Singapore, No. 14 in South Africa, and No. 17 in Thailand during the week in mid-February 2024. As of October 2024, the total number of views on TikTok reached 240 million.
