= Phoebe Cates =

American actress (born 1963)

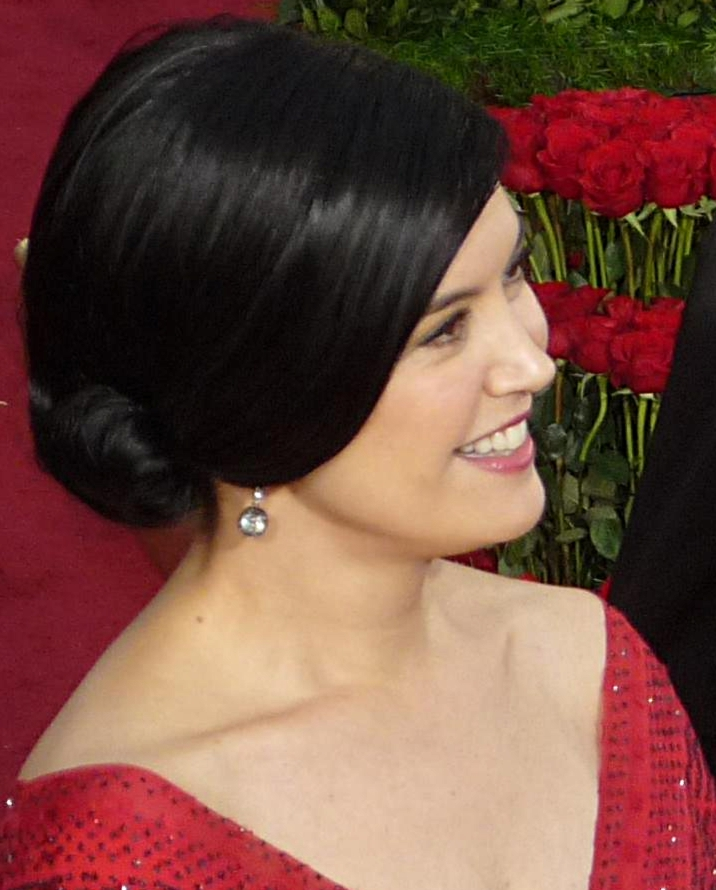
- Cates in 2009
- Born: Phoebe Belle Cates; July 16, 1963 (age 63); New York City, U.S.
- Other name: Phoebe Cates Kline
- Occupations: Actress; model; businesswoman
- Years active: 1973–1994; 2001 (Note: Brief return: 2001)
- Spouse: Kevin Kline (m. 1989)
- Children: Owen Kline; Greta Kline
- Relatives: Gilbert Cates (uncle); Gil Cates Jr. (cousin)

Phoebe Belle Cates Kline (born July 16, 1963) is an American businesswoman and retired actress and model. She appeared in the films Paradise (1982), Fast Times at Ridgemont High (1982), Gremlins (1984), Gremlins 2: The New Batch (1990), Drop Dead Fred (1991) and Princess Caraboo (1994). In 2005, she founded the Blue Tree boutique.

== Early life ==
Cates was born on July 16, 1963, in New York City, to a family of television and Broadway production insiders. She is the daughter of Lily and Joseph Cates (né Katz), who was a major Broadway producer and a pioneering figure in television, and who helped create The $64,000 Question. Her uncle, Gilbert Cates, produced numerous television specials, often in partnership with Cates's father, as well as several annual Academy Awards shows. Her father was Jewish and her mother was Catholic. Her mother was born in Shanghai, China to a family of Chinese-Filipino heritage. Cates's father was Russian Jewish from Manhattan. Cates has a sister.

Cates attended the Professional Children's School and the Juilliard School. A few years later, she wanted to become a dancer, and eventually received a scholarship to the School of American Ballet, but quit after a knee injury at age 14.

== Career ==
At age ten, Cates started modeling, appearing in Seventeen and other teen-oriented magazines, and began a short, successful career as a model. She said that she disliked the industry: "It was just the same thing, over and over. After a while, I did it solely for the money." As a teen model, Cates appeared on the cover of Seventeen magazine four times, first in the April 1979 issue. She appeared within the magazine as well, on the editorial pages in 1979 and 1980. Dissatisfied with modeling, Cates decided to pursue acting.

Cates was offered her first part in the movie Paradise (1982) after a screen test in New York. She was uncertain about the nudity the role required, but her father encouraged her to take the job.

Paradise was filmed in Israel from March to May 1981. In the film, Cates performed several full-frontal nude scenes and several rear scenes aged 17. The movie had a plot similar to The Blue Lagoon. She also sang the film's theme song and recorded an album of the same name. In a 1982 interview, she recalled having trouble with the career change: As a model, she had to be conscious of the camera; but as an actress, she could not. She later regretted being in the film: "What I learned was never to do a movie like that again." She claimed that the film's producers used a body double to film nude close-ups of her character without telling her. According to her co-star Willie Aames, "She will have nothing to do with the film. She's really upset about it. She won't do any promotion with me."

Later that year, Cates starred in Fast Times at Ridgemont High (1982), featuring what Rolling Stone has described as "the most memorable bikini-drop in cinema history". She said that she had "the most fun" filming that movie.

The next year, Cates was in the comedy Private School (1983), co-starring Matthew Modine and Betsy Russell, in which she sang on two songs of the film's soundtrack: "Just One Touch" and "How Do I Let You Know".

In 1984, Cates starred in the TV mini-series Lace, based on a novel by Shirley Conran. She played the role of Lili "to get away from a sameness in her movie portrayals". During her audition, she so impressed the writer that he wanted to hire her on the spot. She struggled with the portrayal of a bitter movie star because, despite her character's vicious persona, she wanted the audience to sympathize with her. She did not read Conran's novel, on which the movie was based because she did not want to have a "fixed image". Her best-known line in the film, "Which one of you bitches is my mother?", was named the greatest line in television history by TV Guide in 1993. She also starred in the sequel mini-series Lace II.

Later that same year, Cates co-starred in the box office hit Gremlins for executive producer Steven Spielberg, the highest-grossing film of her career. She reprised her role of Kate Beringer in the sequel Gremlins 2: The New Batch.

In June 1984, Cates made her stage debut in the Off-Broadway play The Nest of the Wood Grouse, a comedy by Soviet writer Viktor Rozov, at the Joseph Papp Public Theater. Cates said that while doing the play she "felt a certain freedom and a certain connection with acting that I had never really felt before". Cates appeared Off-Broadway again two years later in Rich Relations, written by David Henry Hwang, at the Second Stage Theatre. In December 1989, Cates made her Broadway debut in a revival of Paddy Chayefsky's The Tenth Man at the Vivian Beaumont Theater.

In 1988, Cates told an interviewer, "There are simply not that many good parts in film", but that theater had "tons of good women's roles...I think of theater as what I like to do most...I've only felt happy as an actress for about two years. I rarely watch my film work."

Cates continued to appear steadily in films through the early 1990s, usually in supporting roles or in ensemble casts. These include Date with an Angel (1987), Bright Lights, Big City (1988), Shag (1988), Heart of Dixie (1989), Drop Dead Fred (1991) and Bodies, Rest & Motion (1993). The films suffered from mixed to poor reviews and failed to make an impact at the box office.

Cates was set to play Steve Martin's daughter in the successful comedy Father of the Bride (1991), but her pregnancy with her first child forced her to drop out.

In 1994, Cates starred in the fact-based comedy-drama Princess Caraboo (1994) with her husband Kevin Kline. It was Cates's last film before she shifted her focus away from acting to raising her children, Owen and Greta.

=== Post-retirement work ===
In 2001, Cates briefly returned to acting for one film, The Anniversary Party (2001), as a favor to her best friend and former Fast Times at Ridgemont High castmate Jennifer Jason Leigh, who directed it.

In 2005, she ventured into business and opened a boutique, Blue Tree, on New York's Madison Avenue.

== Personal life ==
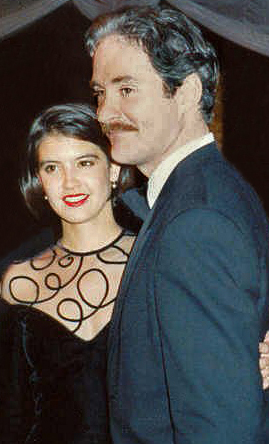
Cates and Kevin Kline at an after party for the 1989 Academy Awards

In the early 1980s, Cates shared an apartment in Greenwich Village with her then-boyfriend Stavros Merjos. She met him in 1979 after she went to her first night at Studio 54 with family friend Andy Warhol.

In 1983, Cates auditioned for a role in The Big Chill which ultimately went to Meg Tilly. At the auditions, Cates met actor Kevin Kline. They were both dating other people but became romantically involved two years later. They married in a private New York wedding on March 5, 1989, and she changed her name to Phoebe Cates Kline.

They moved to the Upper East Side of Manhattan in New York, across Fifth Avenue from Central Park, where they raised their two children, son Owen Joseph Kline (b. 1991) and daughter Greta Kline (b. 1994). In 2001, Owen and Greta appeared with their parents in The Anniversary Party. Owen also appeared in the 2005 film The Squid and the Whale, and made his directorial debut with the coming-of-age black comedy Funny Pages. Greta is a musician who fronts the band Frankie Cosmos.

== Filmography ==
=== Film ===
Year	Film	Role	Notes
1982	Paradise	Sarah	
1982	Fast Times at Ridgemont High	Linda Barrett	
1983	Private School	Christine Ramsey	
1984	Gremlins	Kate Beringer	
1987	Date with an Angel	Patricia "Patty" Winston	
1988	Shag	Carson McBride	
1988	Bright Lights, Big City	Amanda Conway	
1989	Heart of Dixie	Aiken Reed	
1990	I Love You to Death	Joey's Girl at Disco	Uncredited
1990	Gremlins 2: The New Batch	Kate Beringer	
1991	Drop Dead Fred	Elizabeth "Lizzie" Cronin	
1993	Bodies, Rest & Motion	Carol	
1993	My Life's in Turnaround	Herself	
1994	Princess Caraboo	Princess Caraboo/Mary Baker	
2001	The Anniversary Party	Sophia Gold	

=== Television ===
Year	Film	Role	Notes
1983	Baby Sister	Annie Burroughs	Television film
1984	Lace	Elizabeth "Lili" Lace	Miniseries
1985	Lace II	Elizabeth "Lili" Lace	Miniseries
1990	Largo Desolato	Young Philosophy Student	Television film
1994	Sesame Street	Herself	1 episode
2000	VH1- Where Are They Now?	Herself	Episode: "Music Movie Stars"
