= Paradise (1982 film) =

- Theatrical release poster
- Directed by: Stuart Gillard
- Written by: Stuart Gillard
- Produced by: Robert Lantos; Stephen J. Roth
- Starring: Willie Aames; Phoebe Cates; Tuvia Tavi
- Cinematography: Adam Greenberg
- Edited by: Howard Terrill
- Music by: Paul Hoffert
- Production companies: RSL Films; Guardian Trust Company
- Distributed by: New World-Mutual
- Release date: May 7, 1982
- Running time: 100 minutes
- Country: Canada
- Language: English
- Budget: CA$3.5 million
- Box office: $5.5 million or $2,355,145

Paradise is a 1982 Canadian adventure-romance film written and directed by Stuart Gillard (in his directorial debut). It stars Phoebe Cates, Willie Aames, and Tuvia Tavi. The original music score was composed by Paul Hoffert. "Theme from Paradise" was written and produced by Joel Diamond and L. Russell Brown and sung by Cates. The film was critiqued at the time as a "knockoff" of the more famous The Blue Lagoon, as it shared a similar story to the 1980 film.

== Plot ==
In 1823, during the Georgian era, teenagers David and Sarah travel with a caravan from Baghdad to Damascus. At an oasis, a slaver known as "The Jackal" raids the party and attempts to add the beautiful young Sarah, the daughter of a wealthy British merchant, to his harem. David and Sarah and her servant, Geoffrey, narrowly escape, but all the others are slain in a massacre, including David's American missionary parents. When Geoffrey seeks help at an encampment, he is killed when he learns too late that it's controlled by the Jackal.

Left to fend for themselves, David and Sarah head west, struggling to survive the desert’s harsh conditions. Eventually, they stumble upon a stunning oasis by the sea: a paradise where they can rest, recover, and let their guard down. In this peaceful setting, their relationship grows, and they discover love and intimacy for the first time. Away from the rules of society, they find freedom and joy in each other, but their happiness can’t last forever.

The Jackal is still hunting David and Sarah, and their idyllic life is interrupted when he closes in on their oasis. David, determined to protect Sarah, hatches a plan to lure the slaver to his death. In a tense climax, David finally defeats the Jackal, ensuring their safety.

As they continue their journey, Sarah reveals that she is pregnant, adding a hopeful note to their story. The film ends with the young lovers finally reaching the city of Damascus, having grown from innocent teenagers into resilient survivors.

== Cast ==
- Phoebe Cates as Sarah
- Willie Aames as David
- Tuvia Tavi as The Jackal
- Richard Curnock as Geoffrey
- Neil Vipond as Reverend
- Aviva Marks as Rachel
- Yosef Shiloach as Ahmed

== Production ==
Producers of the film, Robert Lantos and Stephen J. Roth first selected Willie Aames and later, after a screen test, agreed on Phoebe Cates for the role of Sarah. The film marked the acting debut of Cates, who was 17 years old at the time of filming. Cates's starring role involved several fully nude scenes. She was also selected to sing the movie's theme song. The film was shot on location at various settings in Israel including Tel Aviv, the Dead Sea and the Sea of Galilee.

During production, Aames and Cates both decided that the film did not need as much nudity as the script called for. In interviews, Aames and Cates claimed that "the producer (Lantos) went back to Canada and used somebody else in the shots. They weren't in the version of the film they showed us for approval. When I finally got to see the final print months later, I flipped." Lantos responded to this by saying that it was up to himself and the distributor to decide what would be included in the final release, not any of the actors. He furthermore claimed that "99% of it was what Willie and Phoebe shot."

Nevertheless, Aames agreed to promote the film because, as he admitted, "Aside from those parts that bother me, it's a damn good film." Cates felt differently and refused to have anything to do with promotion, such as screenings and parties. According to Aames, Cates was "really upset" by the film and was worried it would kill her career.

== Critical reception ==
On Metacritic the film has a weighted average score of 20 out of 100, based on 5 critics, indicating "generally unfavorable reviews".

Writing in The Washington Post, Tom Shales stated that Paradise "amounts to 100 minutes of agonizing tedium seasoned with equal parts excruciating embarrassment". He also criticized the depiction of the Jackal, describing the character as "an offensively stereotyped Arab". Leonard Maltin's annual Movie Guide book describes it this way: "Rating: star and a half. Silly Blue Lagoon ripoff, with Aames and Cates discovering sex while stranded in the desert. Both, however, do look good sans clothes." Upon its release, when reviewed on the show Sneak Previews, Roger Ebert selected it as his "Dog of the Week," the worst film he saw that week, and heavily berated it. In his book Reel Bad Arabs, writer Jack Shaheen criticized Paradise for the character of the Jackal, calling him a "particularly degrading" depiction of an Arab sheikh.

== Nominations ==
Golden Raspberry Awards

Nominated: Worst Actor (Willie Aames for this film and Zapped!)
